= 1893 in Germany =

- Decades: 1870s; 1880s; 1890s; 1900s; 1910s
- See also: Other events of 1893; History of Germany • Timeline • Years

Events in the year 1893 in Germany.

== Incumbents ==
=== National level ===
- Emperor – Wilhelm II
- Chancellor – Leo von Caprivi

=== State level ===
==== Kingdoms ====
- King of Bavaria – Otto
- King of Prussia – Wilhelm II
- King of Saxony – Albert
- King of Württemberg – William II

==== Grand Duchies ====
- Grand Duke of Baden – Frederick I
- Grand Duke of Hesse – Ernest Louis
- Grand Duke of Mecklenburg-Schwerin – Frederick Francis III
- Grand Duke of Mecklenburg-Strelitz – Frederick William
- Grand Duke of Oldenburg – Peter II
- Grand Duke of Saxe-Weimar-Eisenach - Charles Alexander

==== Principalities ====
- Schaumburg-Lippe – Adolf I, Prince of Schaumburg-Lippe to 8 May, then George, Prince of Schaumburg-Lippe
- Schwarzburg-Rudolstadt – Günther Victor, Prince of Schwarzburg-Rudolstadt
- Schwarzburg-Sondershausen – Karl Günther, Prince of Schwarzburg-Sondershausen
- Principality of Lippe – Woldemar, Prince of Lippe
- Reuss Elder Line – Heinrich XXII, Prince Reuss of Greiz
- Reuss Younger Line – Heinrich XIV, Prince Reuss Younger Line
- Waldeck and Pyrmont – George Victor, Prince of Waldeck and Pyrmont to 12 May, then Friedrich, Prince of Waldeck and Pyrmont

==== Duchies ====
- Duke of Anhalt – Frederick I, Duke of Anhalt
- Duke of Brunswick – Prince Albert of Prussia (regent)
- Duke of Saxe-Altenburg – Ernst I, Duke of Saxe-Altenburg
- Duke of Saxe-Coburg and Gotha – Ernst II, Duke of Saxe-Coburg and Gotha to 22 August, then Alfred, Duke of Saxe-Coburg and Gotha from 23 August
- Duke of Saxe-Meiningen – Georg II, Duke of Saxe-Meiningen

==== Colonial Governors ====
- Cameroon (Kamerun) – Eugen von Zimmerer (3rd term) to 27 June, then Leist
- German East Africa (Deutsch-Ostafrika) – Julius Freiherr von Soden to 15 September, then Friedrich Radbod Freiher von Schele
- German New Guinea (Deutsch-Neuguinea) – Georg Schmiele (Landeshauptleute of the German New Guinea Company)
- German South-West Africa (Deutsch-Südwestafrika) – Curt von François (commissioner until November, then Landeshauptleute)
- Togoland – Jesko von Puttkamer (acting commissioner until November, then Landeshauptleute) (2nd term)

== Events ==
- 15 June – In the federal election the Social Democratic Party of Germany come top with 1.7 million votes but still only finish fourth overall in terms of seats, behind the Centre Party, German Conservative Party and the National Liberal Party. Antisemitic parties see their vote share increase five times over.

=== Undated ===
- Cholera Riots break out in Hamburg resulting in the deaths of a sanitary officer and a policeman. The riots are eventually quashed by bayonet-wielding troops.
- Eugen Richter leads his followers in a split from the German Free-minded Party to form the Free-minded People's Party.

== Arts ==
- 23 December – Engelbert Humperdinck's opera Hänsel und Gretel receives its premiere in Weimar.

=== Undated ===
- Franz Kaim establishes the Munich Philharmonic.
- Johannes Brahms completes his Six Pieces for Piano, Op. 118 (Brahms).
- Oskar Panizza publishes the novel The Operated Jew, a satirical, anti-Semitic novel with scientific racism overtones.

== Commerce ==
- 20 June – Zentis, a confectionery and preserve concern, begins trading in Aachen.
- 1 September – Franz Ramesohl and Franz Schmidt open a milk separator-producing workshop under the name of Ramesohl & Schmidt oHG in Oelde. The workshop forms the basis of the still extant company GEA Westfalia Separator.

== Science ==
- Rudolf Diesel operates the first successful diesel engine.
- Wilhelm Dörpfeld begins his excavations on the site of the ancient city of Troy.
- Wilhelm Wien formulates Wien's displacement law.

== Sport ==
=== Association football clubs established ===
- 6 March – Leipziger BC 1893
- 10 May – Minerva Berlin
- 2 July – TSF Ditzingen
- 29 July – Altonaer FC von 1893
- 9 September – Stuttgarter Fußballverein
- 1 October – SV Nord Wedding 1893
- 18 November – Akademischer SC 1893 Berlin
- 22 November – Berliner Fussball Club vom Jahre 1893
- November – Sportbrüder Leipzig

=== Date unknown ===
- FC Association 1893 Hamburg
- FC Hanau 93
- KSV Hessen Kassel
- VfB Einheit zu Pankow

== Transport ==
- The Bremer Vulkan shipbuilding company opens at the Johann Lange shipyard in Bremen.
- The Prussian S 3 steam locomotive begins production.
- First flight of Lilienthal Normalsegelapparat by Otto Lilienthal

== Births ==
January

- 2 January – Walter Hörnlein, Wehrmacht general (died 1961)
- 12 January:
  - Hermann Göring, World War I fighter ace and Reichsmarschall of Nazi Germany (died 1946)
  - Alfred Rosenberg, Nazi ideologue (died 1946)
- 15 January – George of Saxony, Crown prince of Saxony (died 1943)
- 18 January:
  - Wolfgang Klemperer, Austro-American scientist (died 1965)
  - Hans Schlemmer, Wehrmacht general (died 1973)
- 19 January – Johannes Dieckmann, politician (died 1969)
- 22 January – Otto Herfurth, Wehrmacht general and July 20 conspirator (died 1944)

February

- 8 February – Werner Willikens, German politician (died 1961)
- 13 February – Franz Brandt, World War I flying ace (died 1954)
- 17 February:
  - Gustav Höhne, Wehrmacht general (died 1951)
  - Wolff von Stutterheim, Wehrmacht general (died 1940)
- 21 February – Friedrich Manschott, World War I German flying ace (died 1917)
- 26 February – Otto Kissenberth, World War I German flying ace (died 1919)
- 28 February – Gerhard Roßbach, Freikorps leader (died 1967)

March

- 6 March – Fritz Otto Bernert, World War I German flying ace (died 1918)
- 12 March – Erwin Planck, German politician (died 1945)
- 16 March – Herbert von Bose, German publicist (died 1934)
- 19 March – Gertrud Dorka, archaeologist, prehistorian and museum director (died 1976)
- 20 March – Kurt Wissemann, World War I German flying ace (died 1917)
- 21 March – Walter Schreiber, Austro-Hungarian Imperial Army and Wehrmacht general (died 1970 in Argentina)
- 23 March – Andreas von Aulock, Imperial Army officer and Wehrmacht general (died 1968)
- 24 March:
  - Walter Baade, German astronomer (died 1960)
  - Emmy Göring, German actress (died 1973)
- 30 March – Theodor Krancke, Kriegsmarine admiral (died 1973)
- 31 March – Herbert Meinhard Mühlpfordt, German historian (died 1982)

April

- 3 April – Hans Riegel Sr., German inventor entrepreneur (died 1945)
- 6 April:
  - Friedrich Karl of Prussia, Prince of Prussia (died 1917)
  - Alfred Gerstenberg, Luftwaffe general (died 1959)
- 13 April – Günther Krappe, Wehrmacht officer (died 1981)
- 15 April – Maximilian Ritter von Pohl, German army and air force officer (died 1951)
- 17 April – Maximilian von Herff, Waffen-SS officer (died 1945)
- 18 April – Johann Mickl, Austrian Imperial Army officer and Wehrmacht general (died 1945)
- 23 April – Thomas-Emil von Wickede, Wehrmacht general (died 1944)
- 25 April – Ernst Torgler, German politician (died 1963)
- 29 April – Johann Reichhart, German executioner (died 1972)
- 30 April – Viktor Schobinger, German flying ace in both world wars (died 1989)
- 30 April – Joachim von Ribbentrop, German politician (died 1946)

May

- 6 May – Hinrich Wilhelm Kopf, German politician (died 1961)
- 11 May – Augustin Rösch, German Catholic priest (died 1961)
- 12 May – Hasso von Wedel, World War I German flying ace (died 1945)
- 14 May – Joachim von Busse, World War I German flying ace (died 1945)
- 17 May – Hans von Häbler, World War I German flying ace (died 1918)
- 19 May – Karl Thom, World War I German flying ace (died 1945)
- 20 May – Helmuth Schlömer, Wehrmacht general (died 1995)
- 25 May – Mortimer von Kessel, Wehrmacht general (died 1981)
- 27 May:
  - Hermann Dörnemann, German supercentenarian (died 2005)
  - Paul Helwig, Germany psychologist (died 1963)

June

- 6 June – Karl von Graffen, Wehrmacht general (died 1964)
- 10 June – Rudolf Querner, Waffen-SS general (died 1945)
- 13 June – Reinhold Tiling, German engineer (died 1933)
- 20 June – Wilhelm Zaisser, East German politician (died 1958)
- 22 June:
  - Friedrich Köchling, Wehrmacht general (died 1970)
  - Conrad Veidt, German-American actor (died 1943)
- 24 June – Albert Graf von der Goltz, German aristocrat and Wehrmacht officer (died 1944)
- 26 June – Karl Freiherr von Thüngen, German general (died 1944)
- 30 June – Walter Ulbricht, East German politician (1973)

July

- 6 July – Hans Böhning, World War I German flying ace (died 1934)
- 9 July – Max Ritter von Mulzer, World War I German flying ace (died 1916)
- 15 July – William Dieterle, actor and film director (died 1972)
- 18 July – Werner Lange, Kriegsmarine admiral (died 1965)
- 20 July – Arno von Lenski, German officer (died 1986)
- 21 July – Hans Fallada, German writer (died 1947)
- 23 July – Adolf Fischer, Wehrmacht general (died 1947)
- 26 July – George Grosz, painter (died 1959)

August

- 1 August – Friedrich Zickwolff, Wehrmacht general (died 1944)
- 7 August:
  - Hans-Georg von der Marwitz, World War I German flying ace (died 1925)
  - Günther Rittau, German film director (died 1971)
- 9 August – Ferdinand Schumann-Heink, German actor (died 1958)
- 16 August – Hans Koch, lawyer (died 1945)
- 17 August – Walter Noddack, chemist (died 1960)
- 22 August – Ernst Sieler, general (died 1983)
- 22 August – Ernst Waldow, actor (died 1964)
- 24 August – Haim Ernst Wertheimer biochemist (died 1978)
- 25 August – Oskar Freiherr von Boenigk, flying ace and general (died 1946)
- 26 August – Rolf Wuthmann, general (died 1977)

September

- 4 September – Friedrich Karst, general (died 1975)
- 7 September – Ernst Schirlitz, admiral (died 1978)
- 12 September – Wolfgang Zeller, composer (died 1967)
- 17 September – Willibald Borowietz, general (died 1945)
- 20 September – Hans Scharoun, architect (died 1972)
- 21 September – Erna Scheffler, judge (died 1983)
- 22 September – Hans Leip poet and playwright (died 1983)
- 29 September – Friedrich Ritter von Röth, flying ace (died 1918)
- 30 September – Otto Wernicke, actor (died 1965)

October

- 9 October – Heinrich George, actor (died 1946)
- 12 October – Hans von Greiffenberg, general (died 1951)
- 13 October – Kurt Reidemeister, mathematician (died 1971)
- 16 October – Adolf Kratzer, physicist (died 1983)
- 21 October – Werner Richter, general (died 1944)
- 30 October:
  - Roland Freisler, judge (died 1945)
  - Karl von Oberkamp, general (died 1947)

November

- 6 November – Alfred Schulze-Hinrichs, naval officer (died 1972)
- 10 November – Martin Hering, entomologist (died 1967)
- 14 November – Philipp Albrecht, Duke of Württemberg, nobleman (died 1975)
- 19 November – Rudolf Freiherr von Roman, general (died 1970)

December

- 1 December – Ernst Toller, playwright (died 1939)
- 7 December – Hermann Balck, general (died 1982)
- 8 December – Albert Brendel, officer
- 9 December – Albert Abicht, politician (died 1973)
- 20 December – Ernst Pfeiffer, entomologist (died 1955)
- 23 December – Walther von Axthelm, general (died 1972)
- 26 December – Josef Rieder, cyclist (died 1916)
- 31 December – Friedrich Christian, Margrave of Meissen, nobleman (died 1968)

== Deaths ==
- 30 January – Victor I, Duke of Ratibor, nobleman (born 1818)
- 14 February – Ludwig Lindenschmit the Elder, painter (born 1809)
- 18 February – Gerson von Bleichröder, banker (born 1822)
- 24 February – Karl Anton Eugen Prantl, botanist (born 1849)
- 25 April – Hermann Gundert, missionary (born 1814)
- 3 May – Adolf Kiessling, philologist (born 1837)
- 8 May – Adolf I, Prince of Schaumburg-Lippe (born 1817)
- 12 May – George Victor, Prince of Waldeck and Pyrmont (born 1831)
- 14 May – Ernst Kummer, mathematician (born 1810)
- 6 June – Karl Josef von Hefele, theologian (born 1809)
- 7 June – Hermann Julius Grüneberg, chemist (born 1827)
- 12 June – Duke Maximilian Emanuel in Bavaria, nobleman (born 1849)
- 12 June - Ferdinand Jühlke, German botanist (born 1815)
- 14 June – Jakob Frohschammer, philosopher (born 1821)
- 19 June – Hermann Baumgarten, historian (born 1825)
- 23 June – Rudolf von Roth, indologist (born 1821)
- 8 July – Eduard von Lutz, general (born 1810)
- 5 August – Friedrich Wilhelm Adami, author (born 1816)
- 22 August – Ernst II, Duke of Saxe-Coburg and Gotha (born 1818)
- 26 August – Friedrich Gustav Carl Ulrich Franz von Schnehen, nobleman (born 1808)
- 15 September – Hermann Sauppe, philologist (born 1809)
- 7 October – Maximilian von Versen, nobleman (born 1833)
- 12 October – Georg von Kameke, general (born 1817)
- 29 October – Gustav Mützel, artist (born 1839)
- 9 November – Hermann August Hagen, entomologist (born 1817)
- 21 November – Rudolf Kaltenbach, gynaecologist (born 1842)
- 25 November – Johann Bauschinger, mathematician (born 1834)
- 11 December – Georg von der Gabelentz, linguist (born 1840)
- 15 December – Karl Ludwig Michelet, philosopher (born 1801)
