= 1879 in Germany =

- Decades: 1850s; 1860s; 1870s; 1880s; 1890s
- See also: Other events of 1879; History of Germany • Timeline • Years

Events from the year 1879 in Germany.

== Incumbents ==
=== National level ===
- Emperor – William I
- Chancellor – Otto von Bismarck

=== State level ===
==== Kingdoms ====
- King of Bavaria – Ludwig II
- King of Prussia – William I
- King of Saxony – Albert
- King of Württemberg – Charles

==== Grand Duchies ====
- Grand Duke of Baden – Frederick I
- Grand Duke of Hesse – Louis IV
- Grand Duke of Mecklenburg-Schwerin – Frederick Francis II
- Grand Duke of Mecklenburg-Strelitz – Frederick William
- Grand Duke of Oldenburg – Peter II
- Grand Duke of Saxe-Weimar-Eisenach – Charles Alexander

==== Principalities ====
- Schaumburg-Lippe – Adolf I, Prince of Schaumburg-Lippe
- Schwarzburg-Rudolstadt – George Albert, Prince of Schwarzburg-Rudolstadt
- Schwarzburg-Sondershausen – Gonthier Frederick Charles II, Prince of Schwarzburg-Sondershausen
- Principality of Lippe – Woldemar, Prince of Lippe
- Reuss Elder Line – Heinrich XXII, Prince Reuss of Greiz
- Reuss Younger Line – Heinrich XIV, Prince Reuss Younger Line
- Waldeck and Pyrmont – George Victor, Prince of Waldeck and Pyrmont

==== Duchies ====
- Duke of Anhalt – Frederick I, Duke of Anhalt
- Duke of Brunswick – William, Duke of Brunswick
- Duke of Saxe-Altenburg – Ernst I, Duke of Saxe-Altenburg
- Duke of Saxe-Coburg and Gotha – Ernst II, Duke of Saxe-Coburg and Gotha
- Duke of Saxe-Meiningen – Georg II, Duke of Saxe-Meiningen

== Events ==
- 12 July – The German tariff of 1879 is voted for by a majority of 100 in the Reichstag.
- 21 June – German chemical company Linde is founded.
- 31 May – German inventor Werner von Siemens demonstrates the first electric locomotive using an external power source at Berlin.
- 26 September – Wilhelm Marr founds the Antisemitenliga (League of Antisemites), the first German organization committed specifically to combating the alleged threat to German culture posed by Jews.
- 7 October – A defensive alliance between Germany and Austria-Hungary is created by treaty.
- 31 December – Karl Benz produces a two-stroke gas engine.

== Births ==
- 4 February – Wilhelm von Gayl, German politician (died 1945)
- 25 February – Julius Falkenstein, German actor (died 1933)
- 2 March – Johann Viktor Bredt, German jurist and politician (died 1940)
- 8 March – Otto Hahn, German chemist and pioneer in the fields of radioactivity and radiochemistry (died 1968)
- 9 March – Agnes Miegel, German poet (died 1964)
- 10 March – Hans Luther, German politician, briefly Chancellor of Germany (died 1962)
- 12 March – Alfred Abel, German actor (died 1837)
- 14 March – Albert Einstein, German-Swiss theoretical physicist who developed the general theory of relativity (died 1955)
- 27 April – Alfred Roth, German politician and writer (died 1948)
- 31 May – F.W. Schröder-Schrom, German actor (died 1956)
- 28 May – Albert Grzesinski, German politician (died 1948)
- 5 June – Robert Mayer, German-born British philanthropist (died 1985)
- 6 September
  - Max Schreck, German actor (died 1936)
  - Joseph Wirth, German politician, former Chancellor of Germany (died 1956)
- 9 October – Max von Laue, German physicist (died 1960)
- 28 October – Martin Kirschner, German surgeon (died 1942)
- 29 October – Franz von Papen, German politician, Chancellor of Germany (died 1969)
- 1 November – Oskar Barnack, German inventor and German photographer (died 1936)
- 14 December – Hermann Dietrich, German politician (died 1954)
- 16 December – Otto Ludwig Haas-Heye, German fashion designer (died 1959)

== Deaths ==
- 24 January – Heinrich Geißler, German physicist (born 1814
- 23 February – Albrecht von Roon, Prussian soldier and statesman, minister of War from 1859 to 1873, (born 1803)
- 25 February – Karl Wilhelm von Willisen, Prussian general (born 1790)
- 13 March – Adolf Anderssen, German chess master (born 1818)
- 4 April – Heinrich Wilhelm Dove, German physicist and meteorologist (born 1803)
- 11 May – Bernhard Wolff, German newspaper publisher (born 1811)
- 15 May – Gottfried Semper, German architect (born 1803)
- 5 June – August Krönig, German chemist and physicist (born 1822)
- 7 September – George Westermann, German publisher (born 1810)
- 23 August – Alexander Duncker, German publisher (born 1813)
- 20 October – Bernhard Ernst von Bülow, German diplomat and politician (born 1815)
- 1 December – Franz Ittenbach, German painter (born 1813)
