= 1963 in Germany =

- Decades: 1940s; 1950s; 1960s; 1970s; 1980s
- See also: Other events of 1963; History of Germany • Timeline • Years

Events in the year 1963 in Germany.

== Incumbents ==
- President – Heinrich Lübke
- Chancellor
  - Konrad Adenauer (until 11 October 1963)
  - Ludwig Erhard (from 11 October 1963)

== Events ==
- January 22 - The Élysée Treaty was signed as a treaty of friendship between France and West Germany by President Charles de Gaulle and Chancellor Konrad Adenauer.
- February 17 - West Berlin state election, 1963
- February 28 - Germany in the Eurovision Song Contest 1963
- March 31 - Rhineland-Palatinate state election, 1963
- April 1 German broadcaster ZDF started.
- June 21 - July 2 - 13th Berlin International Film Festival
- June 26 - Ich bin ein Berliner is a quotation from a June 26, 1963, speech by U.S. President John F. Kennedy in West Berlin.
- October 17 - The First Erhard cabinet led by Ludwig Erhard was sworn in.
- October 20 - East German general election, 1963
- November 7 - Wunder von Lengede
- Date unknown - Berliner Philharmonie is completed.

== Births ==
- January 4
  - Till Lindemann, German singer
  - Martina Proeber, German Olympic diver
- January 11
  - Petra Schneider, German swimmer
  - Roland Wohlfarth, German football player
- January 15 - Mathias Döpfner, German manager
- January 17 - Kai Hansen, German power metal guitarist and singer
- January 18 - Phillip Boa, German singer and musician
- January 21 - Detlef Schrempf, German basketball player
- February 14 - Annette Kurschus, German präses of the Evangelical Church of Westphalia.
- February 15 - Guildo Horn, German singer
- February 20 - Oliver Mark, German photographer
- February 23 - Andrea Sawatzki, German actress
- March 2 - Monica Theodorescu, German equestrian
- March 5 - Thomas Hermanns, German TV-presenter, director, TV-author and comedian
- March 20 - Stephan Ackermann, German bishop of Roman Catholic Church
- April 4 - Brigitte Voit, German chemist
- April 10 - Angela Hohmann, German politician
- April 11 - Jörg Woithe, German swimmer
- June 1 - Angelika Nussberger, German judge
- June 3 - Axel Wegner, German sport shooter
- June 9 - Justus Zeyen, German pianist (died 2025)
- June 13 - Bettina Bunge, German tennis player
- June 29 - Anne-Sophie Mutter, German violinist
- July 2 - Jens Riewa, German journalist
- July 4 - Ute Lemper, German singer
- July 13 - Manuela Schmidt, German politician
- July 16 - Walter Kohl, German businessman and author
- July 24 - Lars Nieberg, German equestrian
- August 9 - Petra Pau, German politician
- August 18 - Heino Ferch, German actor
- August 26 - Ludger Beerbaum, German equestrian
- September 2 – Thor Kunkel, German novelist
- September 9 - Markus Wasmeier, German alpine ski racer
- September 16 - Nikolaus Blome, German journalist
- September 27 - Caren Metschuck, German swimmer
- October 9 - Anja Jaenicke, German actress
- October 13 - Thomas Dörflein, German zookeeper (died 2008)
- October 27
  - Farin Urlaub, German singer
  - Lou, German singer
- November 1 - Katja Riemann, German actress
- November 10 - Cordula Stratmann, German comedian
- November 16 - Frank Henkel, German politician
- November 23 - Andreas Schmidt, German actor (died 2017)
- December 16 - Bärbel Schäfer, German television presenter
- December 17 - Wolfram Grandezka, German actor
- December 18 - Nino de Angelo, German singer
- December 19 - Til Schweiger, German actor
- December 21 - Andreas Voßkuhle, German judge
- December 29 - Graciano Rocchigiani, German boxer (died 2018)

== Deaths ==
- January 19 — Ernst Torgler, German communist and politician (born 1893)
- March 22 - Cilly Aussem, German tennis player (born 1909), died in Italy
- March 27 - Harry Piel, German actor and filmdirector (born 1892)
- April 6 - Karl Scharnagl, German politician (born 1881)
- June 16 - Otto Ostrowski, German politician (born 1883)
- July 2 - Bodo Uhse, German writer (born 1904)
- August 7 — Paul Helwig, German psychologist (born 1893)
- 4 September – Marie Kreft, German politician (born 1876)
- September 17 - Eduard Spranger, German (born 1882)
- October 7 - Gustaf Gründgens, German actor (born 1899)
- October 27 - Berthold, Margrave of Baden, German nobleman (born 1906)
- December 5 - Karl Amadeus Hartmann, German composer (born 1905)
- December 12 - Theodor Heuss, German politician and former President of Germany (born 1884)
- December 14 - Erich Ollenhauer, German politician (born 1901)
- December 21 - Paul Westheim, German art historian and publisher (born 1886)
- December 28 - Paul Hindemith, German composer, violist, violinist, teacher and conductor (born 1895)

== See also ==
- 1963 in German television
