= 1954 in Germany =

- Decades: 1930s; 1940s; 1950s; 1960s; 1970s
- See also: Other events of 1954; History of Germany • Timeline • Years

Events in the year 1954 in Germany.

== Incumbents ==
- President – Theodor Heuss (re-elected in July 1954)
- Chancellor – Konrad Adenauer
- Second Adenauer cabinet

== Events ==
- 25 January–18 February - Berlin Conference, a meeting of the foreign ministers of the United States, Soviet Union, United Kingdom and France
- 18–29 June - 4th Berlin International Film Festival
- 4 July - Germany wins the 1954 FIFA World Cup Final in Association football
- 20 July - Otto John, president of the West German Federal Office for the Protection of the Constitution since 1950, having disappeared from the West, resurfaces in East Berlin and denounces Western policies. In December 1955, he returns to the West
- September - Wittig reaction reported. Georg Wittig shares the 1979 Nobel Prize in Chemistry for its discovery
- 23 September - 1954 Bitburg explosion: an explosion of military jet fuel kills 34
- October - Bonn–Paris conventions: treaties and protocols are signed in Paris, paving the way for West German rearmament and its admission to NATO (6 May 1955).
- 17 October - 1954 East German general election (a sham election as East Germany is a one-party state)
- Undated
  - The high-speed angle grinder is invented by Ackermann + Schmitt (FLEX-Elektrowerkzeuge GmbH) of Steinheim an der Murr
  - The first electric drip brew coffeemaker is patented in Germany and named the Wigomat

== Births ==
- 4 January
  - Birgit Havenstein, German composer
  - Peter Seiffert, German operatic tenor (died 2025)
- 16 January - Wolfgang Schmidt, German track and field athlete
- 19 January
  - Katharina Thalbach, German actress
  - Joachim Deckarm, German handball player
- 21 January - Thomas de Maizière, German politician
- 28 January - Peter Lampe, German theologian and historian
- 7 February - Dieter Bohlen, German songwriter, producer, singer and television personality
- 10 February - Peter Ramsauer, German politician
- 19 February
  - Francis Buchholz, German bass guitarist (died 2026)
  - Reiner Haseloff, German politician
- 26 February - Prince Ernst August of Hanover, German head of the deposed royal House of Hanover
- 1 March - Volker Wieker, German chief of staff of the Bundeswehr
- 6 March - Harald Schumacher, German football player
- 26 March
  - Jutta Speidel, German actress
  - Udo Di Fabio, German judge
- 1 April - Dieter Müller, German football player
- 9 April - Arnold Stadler, German writer
- 16 April - Sibylle Lewitscharoff, German author (died 2023)
- 19 April - Ingrid Peters, German singer
- 20 April
  - Gero von Boehm, German journalist
  - Martin Stratmann, German electrochemist and materials scientist
- 21 April - Sabine Engel, German discus thrower
- 1 May - Eckart Diesch, German sailor
- 24 May - Rainald Goetz, German author, playwright and essayist
- 4 June - Hermann Gerland, German football manager
- 8 June - Jochen Schümann, German sailor
- 10 June - Ute Frevert, German historian
- 13 June - Heiner Koch, German bishop of Roman Catholic Church
- 20 June - Karlheinz Brandenburg, German electrical engineer and mathematician
- 22 June - Wolfgang Becker, German film director and screenwriter (died 2024)
- 3 July - Herbert Hainer, German businessman
- 17 July - Angela Merkel, German politician, Chancellor of Germany
- 25 July - Jürgen Trittin, German politician
- 28 July - Gerd Faltings, German mathematician
- 14 August - Berthold Albrecht, German entrepreneur (died 2012)
- 11 October - Sascha Hehn, German actor
- 12 October - Norbert Klaar, German sport shooter
- 3 November - Siegfried Mauser, German pianist
- 25 November - Rudolf Mellinghoff, German judge
- 11 December - Peter Hegemann, German biophysicist, Nobel Prize laureate
- 14 December - Eva Mattes, German actress
- 24 December - Lorenz Caffier, German politician

== Deaths ==
- January 15 - Hermann Höpker-Aschoff, German judge and politician (born 1883)
- January 19 - Cornelius van Oyen, German sport shooter (born 1886)
- January 22 - Princess Margaret of Prussia, Prussian princess (born 1872)
- February 6 - Friedrich Meinecke, German historian (born 1862)
- March 6
  - Hermann Dietrich, German politician (born 1879)
  - Charles Edward, Duke of Saxe-Coburg and Gotha (born 1884 in the United Kingdom)
- March 7 — Otto Diels, German chemist (born 1876)
- April 14 -Siegfried von Roedern, German politician (born 1870)
- May 6 - Duchess Cecilie of Mecklenburg-Schwerin, German crown princess (born 1886)
- May 19 - Johannes Joseph van der Velden, German bishop of Roman Catholic Church (born 1891)
- June 14 - Hermann Wolfgang von Waltershausen, German composer and conductor (born 1882)
- June 27 - Theodor Loos, German actor (born 1883)
- July 1 - Thea von Harbou, German actress, novelist and film director (born 1888)
- July 16 - Herms Niel, German composer (born 1888)
- August 4 - Harald Paulsen, German actor (born 1895)
- August 7 - Wilhelm Dittmann, German politician (born 1874)
- August 25- Johannes Stroux, German philologist and writer (born 1886)
- September 5 - Eugen Schiffer, German politician (born 1860)
- September 27 - Maximilian von Weichs, German field marshal (born 1881)
- October 29 - Hermann Ehlers, German politician (born 1904)
- October 30 - Gustav Dahrendorf, German politician (born 1901)
- November 11 - Reinhold Schünzel, German actor (born 1886)
- November 30 - Wilhelm Furtwängler, German conductor and composer (born 1886)
- December 14 - Emil Rausch, German swimmer (born 1883)
- December 30 - Günther Quandt, German industrialist (born 1881)
- Date unknown — Franz Brandt, World War I German flying ace (born 1893)

== See also ==
- 1954 in German television
