= 1881 in Germany =

- Decades: 1860s; 1870s; 1880s; 1890s; 1900s
- See also: Other events of 1881; History of Germany • Timeline • Years

Events from the year 1881 in Germany.

== Incumbents ==
=== National level ===
- Emperor – William I
- Chancellor – Otto von Bismarck

=== State level ===
==== Kingdoms ====
- King of Bavaria – Ludwig II
- King of Prussia – William I
- King of Saxony – Albert
- King of Württemberg – Charles

==== Grand Duchies ====
- Grand Duke of Baden – Frederick I
- Grand Duke of Hesse – Louis IV
- Grand Duke of Mecklenburg-Schwerin – Frederick Francis II
- Grand Duke of Mecklenburg-Strelitz – Frederick William
- Grand Duke of Oldenburg – Peter II
- Grand Duke of Saxe-Weimar-Eisenach – Charles Alexander

==== Principalities ====
- Schaumburg-Lippe – Adolf I, Prince of Schaumburg-Lippe
- Schwarzburg-Rudolstadt – George Albert, Prince of Schwarzburg-Rudolstadt
- Schwarzburg-Sondershausen – Charles Gonthier, Prince of Schwarzburg-Sondershausen
- Principality of Lippe – Woldemar, Prince of Lippe
- Reuss Elder Line – Heinrich XXII, Prince Reuss of Greiz
- Reuss Younger Line – Heinrich XIV, Prince Reuss Younger Line
- Waldeck and Pyrmont – George Victor, Prince of Waldeck and Pyrmont

==== Duchies ====
- Duke of Anhalt – Frederick I, Duke of Anhalt
- Duke of Brunswick – William, Duke of Brunswick
- Duke of Saxe-Altenburg – Ernst I, Duke of Saxe-Altenburg
- Duke of Saxe-Coburg and Gotha – Ernst II, Duke of Saxe-Coburg and Gotha
- Duke of Saxe-Meiningen – Georg II, Duke of Saxe-Meiningen

== Events ==
- 31 March – last Anti-Socialist Law is passed by the German Reichstag.
- 16 May – Gross-Lichterfelde Tramway, world's first electric tramway, starts in Berlin.
- 25 September – in Meckesheim physician Ferdinand Adolf Kehrer performs the first modern Caesarean section, the transverse incision technique to minimise bleeding.
- 27 October – German federal election, 1881

== Births ==
- 1 January – Hermann Schmitz, German industrialist (died 1960)
- 4 January – Wilhelm Lehmbruck, German sculptor (died 1919)
- 17 January – Karl Scharnagl, German politician (died 1963)
- 16 February – Hans Vogel, German politician (died 1945)
- 16 February – Hans Meiser, German Protestant theologian, pastor and first 'Landesbischof' of the Evangelical Lutheran Church in Bavaria (died 1956)
- 23 March – Hermann Staudinger, German chemist (died 1965)
- 1 April – Wilhelm Sollmann, German journalist and politician (died 1951)
- 3 April – Hans Kniep, German botanist (died 1930)
- 19 April – Ernst Schneppenhorst, German politician (died 1945)
- 2 May – Ernst Legal, German actor (died 1955)
- 18 May – Erwin Madelung, German mathematician (died 1972)
- 30 May – Georg von Küchler, German field marshal (died 1968)
- 31 May – Heinrich Burger, German figure skater (died 1942)
- 9 June – Felix von Luckner, German author, sailor and nobleman (died 1966)
- 24 June – Heinz Tietjen, German conductor (died 1967)
- 24 June – Martin Salomonski, German rabbi (killed 1944)
- 29 June – Gottlob Walz, German diver (died 1943)
- 27 July – Hans Fischer, German chemist and Nobel Prize laureate (died 1945)
- 28 July – Günther Quandt, German industrialist (died 1954)
- 8 August – Paul Ludwig Ewald von Kleist, German field marshal (died 1954)
- 26 August – Franz Gürtner, German jurist and politician (died 1941)
- 4 October – Walther von Brauchitsch, German field marshal (died 1948)
- 9 October – Friedrich Syrup, German politician (died 1945)
- 12 November – Ulrich von Hassell, German diplomat (died 1944)
- 12 November – Maximilian von Weichs, German field marshal (died 1954)
- 2 December – Heinrich Barkhausen, German physicist (died 1956)
- 4 December – Erwin von Witzleben, German officer (died 1944)
- 15 December – Eugen Bolz, German politician (died 1945)
- 25 December – Christian Hülsmeyer, German inventor, physicist and entrepreneur (died 1957)
- 31 December – Max Pechstein, German painter (died 1955)

== Deaths ==
- 7 April – Johann Hinrich Wichern, German religious leader (born 1808)
- 15 May – Franz von Dingelstedt, German poet and dramatist (born 1814)
- 2 June – Friedrich Albrecht zu Eulenburg, German diplomat (born 1815)
- 23 June – Matthias Jakob Schleiden, German botanist (born 1804)
- 10 July – Georg Hermann Nicolai, German architect (born 1812)
- 11 October – Friedrich Hitzig, German architect (born 1811)
