= 1964 in Germany =

- Decades: 1940s; 1950s; 1960s; 1970s; 1980s
- See also: Other events of 1964; History of Germany • Timeline • Years

Events in the year 1964 in Germany.

== Incumbents ==
- President – Heinrich Lübke
- Chancellor – Ludwig Erhard

== Events ==
- 1 January - Start of Einer wird gewinnen with Hans-Joachim Kulenkampff on German broadcaster ARD
- 11 January - Germany in the Eurovision Song Contest 1964
- 26 June - July 7 - 14th Berlin International Film Festival
- 27 June-5 October: documenta III
- 1 July - 1964 West German presidential election
- German company Auto Union is acquired by Volkswagen Group over subsidiary Audi AG.

== Births ==
- 2 January - Chris Welp, German professional basketball player (died 2015)
- 6 January- Henry Maske, boxer
- 28 January - Juergen Teller, German artist and photographer
- 4 February - Elke Philipp, German Paralympic equestrian
- 12 February - Stéphane Franke, German athlete (died 2011)
- 16 February - Susanne Baer, judge
- 27 February - Thomas Lange, rower
- 16 March - H.P. Baxxter, singer
- 18 March - Moses Arndt, politician, doctor and publisher
- 30 March - Rüdiger Hoffmann, comedian
- 5 May - Heike Henkel, athlete
- 21 May - Walter Homolka, rabbi
- 29 April - Markus Majowski, actor and comedian
- 2 June - Caroline Link, film director
- 3 June - Doro, heavy metal singer
- 17 June - Michael Gross, swimmer
- 20 June - Silke Möller, athlete
- 27 June
  - Kai Diekmann, journalist
  - Heike Matthiesen, classical guitarist (d. 2023)
- 17 July – Norbert Dobeleit, television personality and athlete
- 21 July - Jens Weißflog, ski jumper
- 23 July – Nick Menza, German-born American drummer (Megadeth) (d. 2016)
- 30 July - Jürgen Klinsmann, footballer
- 8 August - Jan Josef Liefers, actor
- 17 August - Natascha Ochsenknecht, German actress
- 19 August - Christoph Schrewe film director
- 24 August - Beatrice Gründler, German Arabist
- 12 September - Dirk Richter, German swimmer
- 24 September - Ralf Husmann, German television producer and screenwriter
- 2 October - Dirk Brinkmann, German field hockey player
- 10 October - Maxi Gnauck, gymnast
- 19 October - Georg F. W. Schaeffler, German entrepreneur
- 25 October - Nicole, singer
- 12 November - Barbara Stühlmeyer, German musicologist, church musician and writer
- 7 December - Ilse Aigner, politician
- 8 December - Richard David Precht, author and philosopher
- 9 December
  - Hape Kerkeling, actor and comedian
  - Johannes B. Kerner, journalist, sports caster and television presenter
  - Paul Landers, musician, band Rammstein
  - Michael Müller, politician
- 14 December – Antje Vowinckel, radio artist and musician
- 15 December – Denis Scheck, literary critic and journalist
- 16 December - Heike Drechsler, athlete
- 19 December - Ben Becker, actor
- 24 December - Bernd Michael Lade, actor

== Deaths ==
- January 4 - Andreas Hermes, German politician (born 1878)
- January 18 - Thomas Wimmer, German politician (born 1887)
- January 21 - Joseph Baumgartner, German politician (born 1904)
- January 22 - Lissy Arna, German actress (born 1900)
- February 8 – Ernst Kretschmer, German psychiatrist (born 1888)
- February 13
  - Jakob Brendel, German wrestler (born 1907)
  - Werner Heyde, German psychiatrist (born 1902)
- February 21 -Georg Jacoby, German film director and screenwriter (born 1882)
- March 13 - Friedrich Lahrs, German architect (born 1880)
- April 13 - Veit Harlan, German film director and actor (born 1899)
- April 20 - August Sander, German portrait and documentary photographer (born 1876)
- April 24 - Gerhard Domagk German pathologist and bacteriologist (born 1895)
- May 21 - James Franck, German physicist (born 1882)
- June 5 - Ernst Waldow, German actor (born 1893)
- September 10 - Paul Klingenburg, German water polo player (born 1907)
- September 21 - Otto Grotewohl, German politician (born 1894)
- September 28 - Richard Häussler, German actor (born 1908)
- October 4 - Claus Bergen, German painter (born 1885)
- October 26 - Agnes Miegel, German poet (born 1879)
- November 1 — Karl von Graffen, Wehrmacht general (born 1893)
- November 14 - Heinrich von Brentano, German politician (born 1904)
- December 30 - Hans Gerhard Creutzfeldt, German neuropathologist (born 1885)

== See also ==
- 1964 in German television
