= 1817 in Germany =

- Decades: 1800s; 1810s; 1820s; 1830s
- See also: Other events of 1817; History of Germany • Timeline • Years

Events from the year 1817 in Germany.

== Incumbents ==
=== Kingdoms ===
- Kingdom of Prussia
  - Monarch – Frederick William III (16 November 1797 – 7 June 1840)
- Kingdom of Bavaria
  - Maximilian I (1 January 1806 – 13 October 1825)
- Kingdom of Saxony
  - Frederick Augustus I (20 December 1806 – 5 May 1827)
- Kingdom of Hanover
  - George III (25 October 1760 – 29 January 1820)
- Kingdom of Württemberg
  - William (30 October 1816 – 25 June 1864)

=== Grand Duchies ===
- Grand Duke of Baden
  - Charles 10 June 1811 – 8 December 1818
- Grand Duke of Hesse
  - Louis I (14 August 1806 – 6 April 1830)
- Grand Duke of Mecklenburg-Schwerin
  - Frederick Francis I– (24 April 1785 – 1 February 1837)
- Grand Duke of Mecklenburg-Strelitz
  - George (6 November 1816 – 6 September 1860)
- Grand Duke of Oldenburg
  - Wilhelm (6 July 1785 – 2 July 1823 ) Due to mental illness, Wilhelm was duke in name only, with his cousin Peter, Prince-Bishop of Lübeck, acting as regent throughout his entire reign.
  - Peter I (2 July 1823 – 21 May 1829)
- Grand Duke of Saxe-Weimar-Eisenach
  - Charles Frederick (14 June 1828 – 8 July 1853)

=== Principalities ===
- Schaumburg-Lippe
  - George William (13 February 1787 - 1860)
- Schwarzburg-Rudolstadt
  - Friedrich Günther (28 April 1807 – 28 June 1867)
- Schwarzburg-Sondershausen
  - Günther Friedrich Karl I (14 October 1794 – 19 August 1835)
- Principality of Lippe
  - Leopold II (5 November 1802 – 1 January 1851)
- Principality of Reuss-Greiz
  - Heinrich XIII (28 June 1800 – 29 January 1817)
  - Heinrich XIX (29 January 1817 – 31 October 1836)
- Waldeck and Pyrmont
  - George II (9 September 1813 – 15 May 1845)

=== Duchies ===
- Duke of Anhalt-Dessau
  - Leopold III (16 December 1751 – 9 August 1817)
  - Leopold IV (9 August 1817 – 22 May 1871)
- Duke of Brunswick
  - Charles II (16 June 1815 – 9 September 1830)
- Duke of Saxe-Altenburg
  - Duke of Saxe-Hildburghausen (1780–1826) - Frederick
- Duke of Saxe-Coburg and Gotha
  - Ernest I (9 December 1806 – 12 November 1826)
- Duke of Saxe-Meiningen
  - Bernhard II (24 December 1803 – 20 September 1866)
- Duke of Schleswig-Holstein-Sonderburg-Beck
  - Frederick William (25 March 1816 – 6 July 1825)

== Events ==
- 12 June – German inventor Karl Drais drives his dandy horse ("Draisine" or Laufmaschine), the earliest form of bicycle, in Mannheim.
- 18 October – Wartburg Festival

== Births ==
- 22 February – Carl Wilhelm Borchardt, German mathematician (d. 1880)
- 14 September – Theodor Storm, German writer (d. 1888)
- 30 October – Hermann Franz Moritz Kopp, German chemist (d. 1892)
- 30 November – Theodor Mommsen, German writer, Nobel Prize laureate (d. 1903)

== Deaths ==
- 1 January – Martin Heinrich Klaproth, German chemist who discovered uranium (1789), zirconium (1789), and cerium (1803) (b. 1743)
- 2 April – Johann Heinrich Jung, German writer (b. 1740)
- 30 June – Abraham Gottlob Werner, German geologist (b. 1750)
- 10 August – Leopold III, Duke of Anhalt-Dessau
- 1 December – Justin Heinrich Knecht, German composer, organist and music theorist (b. 1752)
