= 1961 in Germany =

- Decades: 1940s; 1950s; 1960s; 1970s; 1980s
- See also: Other events of 1961; History of Germany • Timeline • Years

Events in the year 1961 in Germany.

== Incumbents ==
- President – Heinrich Lübke
- Chancellor – Konrad Adenauer

== Events ==
- 25 February - Germany in the Eurovision Song Contest 1961
- 23 June - 4 July - 11th Berlin International Film Festival
- 12 August - The construction of the Berlin Wall takes place at the heart of Berlin (see also Allied Control Council). It becomes an important symbol of the Cold War.
- 17 September - West German federal election, 1961
- 30 October: The Adenauer III government gives in to pressure from the Turkish government and signs a recruitment agreement (de) with it for guest workers (Gastarbeiter).
- 14 November - The Fourth Adenauer cabinet, led by Konrad Adenauer, is sworn in.
- Date unknown - The Bark scale is devised by German acoustics scientist Eberhard Zwicker and named after Heinrich Barkhausen who proposes the first subjective measurements of loudness.

== Births ==
- 24 January — Guido Buchwald, German football player
- 9 January — Petra Thümer, German swimmer
- 5 February — Dietmar Bär, German actor
- 6 February — Malu Dreyer, German politician
- 18 February — Armin Laschet, German politician
- 25 February — Hermann Gröhe, German politician
- 20 March — Maja Maranow, German actress (died 2016)
- 21 March — Lothar Matthäus, German football player and manager
- 19 April — Bernd Stelter, German comedian
- 23 April — Dirk Bach, German actor (died 2012)
- 29 April — Prince Heinrich of Hanover, German historian and publisher
- 6 May — Patty Ryan, German singer
- 7 May — Hans-Peter Bartels, German politician
- 8 May — Andrea Pollack, German swimmer
- 14 May
  - Ulrike Folkerts, German actress
  - Urban Priol, German comedian
- 6 June — Anke Behmer, German athlete
- 12 June — Hannelore Kraft, German politician
- 29 June — Jörg Meuthen, German politician
- 15 August — Dietmar Mögenburg, German high jumper
- 7 September — Jochen Horst, German actor
- 10 September — Uwe Freimuth, German decathlete
- 12 September — Kirsten Fehrs, German Lutheran bishop
- 14 September — Martina Gedeck, German actress
- 15 September
  - Hendrikje Fitz, German actress (died 2016)
  - Frank Emmelmann, German sprinter
- 23 September — Manfred Schiller, German politician
- 22 October — Dietmar Woidke, German politician
- 17 November — Wolfram Wuttke, German footballer (died 2015)
- 2 December — Gaby Köster, German comedian
- 12 December — Jan Stressenreuter, German author (died 2018)
- 26 December — Jörg Schüttauf, German actor
- 27 December — Guido Westerwelle, politician (died 2016)

== Deaths ==
- 2 January — Walter Hörnlein, Wehrmacht general and Knight's Cross recipient (born 1893)
- 4 February — Heinz Lord, German-American surgeon (born 1917)
- 26 February — Karl Albiker, German sculptor, lithographer and arts professor (born 1878)
- 12 March — Hedwig Wangel, German actress (born 1875)
- 24 April — Hans-Friedrich Blunck, German jurist and writer (born 1888)
- 7 May — Jakob Kaiser, German politician and resistance leader (born 1888)
- 30 May - Werner Richard Heymann, German film composer (born 1896)
- 7 June — Karl Henry von Wiegand, German born American journalist and war correspondent (born 1874)
- 22 July — Georg Rosen, German diplomat (born 1895)
- 23 July — Rudolf Katz, German politician and judge (born 1895)
- 5 August — Hanns Seidel, German politician (born 1901)
- 23 August — Gotthard Sachsenberg, German World War I naval aviator and fighter ace (b. 1891)
- 10 September — Wolfgang von Trips, German racing driver (born 1928)
- 18 October - Wilhelm Boden, German politician (born 1890)
- 21 October - Karl Korsch, German politician (born 1886)
- 25 October — Werner Willikens, German Imperial officer and Nazi public servant (born 1893)
- 26 October — Fritz Lang, German painter (born 1877)
- 7 November — Augustin Rösch, German Catholic priest (born 1893)
- 30 November — Ehrenfried Pfeiffer, German scientist (born 1899)
- 21 December — Hinrich Wilhelm Kopf, German politician (born 1893)
- 23 December — Kurt Meyer, German Generalmajor der Waffen-SS and war criminal (born 1910)
- 25 December — Otto Loewi, pharmacologist and psychobiologist (born 1873)
