= 1960 in Germany =

- Decades: 1940s; 1950s; 1960s; 1970s; 1980s
- See also: Other events of 1960; History of Germany • Timeline • Years

Events in the year 1960 in Germany.

== Incumbents ==
- President – Heinrich Lübke
- Chancellor – Konrad Adenauer

== Events ==
- 1 February - Germany in the Eurovision Song Contest 1960
- 24 June - 5 July - 10th Berlin International Film Festival

== Births ==
- 5 January - Bettina Tietjen, German television presenter and talk show host
- 10 January - Claudia Losch, German shot putter
- 14 January - Andrea Fischer, German politician
- 3 February - Joachim Löw, German football coach
- 7 February
  - Klaus J. Behrendt, German actor
  - Kristin Otto, German swimmer
- 16 February - Frank-Markus Barwasser, German comedian and journalist
- 23 February - Gloria, Princess of Thurn and Taxis, German socialite, businesswoman and artist
- 24 March - Nena, German singer
- 25 March - Markus Maria Profitlich, German comedian and actor
- 12 April – Marianne Zechmeister, alpine skier
- 13 April - Rudi Völler, German football player
- 16 April - Pierre Littbarski, German football player
- 18 April - Neo Rauch, German artist
- 11 May - Jürgen Schult, German discus thrower
- 16 May - Tamme Hanken, German horse whisperer and animals bonesetter (died 2016)
- 7 June
  - Steffen Seibert, German journalist
  - Peter Limbourg, German journalist
- 1 August - Karl-Heinz Wiesemann, German bishop of Roman Catholic Church
- 8 August - Ralf König, German comic writer
- 14 September - Christian Petzold, German film director
- 18 September - Wolfgang Bahro, German actor
- 23 September - Barbara Mensing, German archer
- 27 September - Patrick Lindner, German singer
- 12 October - Dorothee Vieth, German Paralympic cyclist
- 17 October - Hartmut Weber, German athlete
- 24 October - Christoph Schlingensief, German theatre director, performance artist and filmmaker (died 2010)
- 29 October - Dieter Nuhr, German comedian
- 2 November - Andy Borg, German singer
- 4 November - Frl. Menke, German singer
- 9 November
  - Andreas Brehme, German football player and manager (died 2024)
  - Roland Dickgießer, German footballer
  - Thomas Fey, German conductor (died 2026)
- 10 November - Georg Fischer, German cross-country skier and biathlete
- 15 November - Susanne Lothar, German actress (died 2012)
- 27 November - Eike Immel, German football player
- 2 December - Justus von Dohnányi, German actor
- 12 December
  - Volker Beck, German politician
  - Martina Hellmann, German track and field athlete
- 22 December - Felicitas Hoppe, German writer

== Deaths ==
- 4 January — Hugo Meurer, German admiral (born 1869)
- 25 January — Beno Gutenberg, German-American seismologist (born 1889)
- 27 January — Hans Schlossberger, German physician (born 1887)
- 18 March — Hans Bischoff, German entomologist (born 1889)
- 25 March - Ernst Melsheimer, German lawyer (born 1897)
- 30 March - Fritz Klimsch, German sculptor (born 1870)
- 20 April - Helmut Käutner, German film director (born 1908)
- 24 April — Max von Laue, German physicist (born 1879)
- 31 May — Walther Funk, German banker and economist (born 1890)
- 13 June — Wilhelm Keppler, German businessman (born 1882)
- 25 June — Walter Baade, German astronomer (born 1893)
- 29 June — Victor Janson, German actor and film director (born 1884)
- 2 July - Edmund Heckler German engineer & weapons manufacture (born 1906)
- 3 July — Erwin Jaenecke, German general (born 1890)
- 6 July — Hans Wilsdorf, German businessman and founder of Rolex (born 1881)
- 16 July - Albert Kesselring, German Generalfeldmarshal of Luftwaffe (born 1885)
- 20 July — Hans Schlange-Schöningen, member of the Bundestag and co-founder of the Christian-National Peasants' and Farmers' Party
- 24 July — Hans Albers, German actor (born 1891)
- 23 August — Bruno Loerzer, German aviator and air force general (born 1891)
- 7 September - Wilhelm Pieck, German politician (born 1876)
- 8 October - Hermann Schmitz, German industrialist (born 1881)
- 15 October — Henny Porten, German actress and producer (born 1890)
- 5 November — Erich Neumann, German psychologist (born 1905)
- 6 November - Erich Raeder, German admiral (born 1876)
- 9 November — Ernst Wilhelm Bohle, German Nazi general (born 1903)
- 2 December – Fritz August Breuhaus, German architect, interior designer and designer (born 1883)
- 7 December - Walter Noddack, German chemist (born 1893)
- 14 December - Hermine Körner, German actress (born 1878)
- 28 December - Eduard Ludwig, German architect (born 1906)
- 31 December - Joseph Wendel, German cardinal of Roman Catholic Church (born 1901)

== See also ==
- 1960 in German television
