= 1886 in Germany =

- Decades: 1860s; 1870s; 1880s; 1890s; 1900s
- See also: Other events of 1886; History of Germany • Timeline • Years

Events in the year 1886 in Germany.

== Incumbents ==
=== National level ===
- Emperor – William I
- Chancellor – Otto von Bismarck

=== State level ===
==== Kingdoms ====
- King of Bavaria – Ludwig II to 13 June, then Otto
- King of Prussia – William I
- King of Saxony – Albert
- King of Württemberg – Charles

==== Grand Duchies ====
- Grand Duke of Baden – Frederick I
- Grand Duke of Hesse – Louis IV
- Grand Duke of Mecklenburg-Schwerin – Frederick Francis II
- Grand Duke of Mecklenburg-Strelitz – Frederick William
- Grand Duke of Oldenburg – Peter II
- Grand Duke of Saxe-Weimar-Eisenach – Charles Alexander

==== Principalities ====
- Schaumburg-Lippe – Adolf I, Prince of Schaumburg-Lippe
- Schwarzburg-Rudolstadt – George Albert, Prince of Schwarzburg-Rudolstadt
- Schwarzburg-Sondershausen – Charles Gonthier, Prince of Schwarzburg-Sondershausen
- Principality of Lippe – Woldemar, Prince of Lippe
- Reuss Elder Line – Heinrich XXII, Prince Reuss of Greiz
- Reuss Younger Line – Heinrich XIV, Prince Reuss Younger Line
- Waldeck and Pyrmont – George Victor, Prince of Waldeck and Pyrmont

==== Duchies ====
- Duke of Anhalt – Frederick I, Duke of Anhalt
- Duke of Brunswick – Prince Albert of Prussia (regent)
- Duke of Saxe-Altenburg – Ernst I, Duke of Saxe-Altenburg
- Duke of Saxe-Coburg and Gotha – Ernst II, Duke of Saxe-Coburg and Gotha
- Duke of Saxe-Meiningen – Georg II, Duke of Saxe-Meiningen

==== Colonial Governors ====
- Cameroon (Kamerun) – Julius Freiherr von Soden (1st term)
- German East Africa (Deutsch-Ostafrika) – Karl Peters (administrator)
- German New Guinea (Deutsch-Neuguinea) – Gustav von Oertzen (commissioner); also from 10 June Georg Freiherr von Schleinitz (Landeshauptleute of the German New Guinea Company)
- German South-West Africa (Deutsch-Südwestafrika) – Heinrich Ernst Göring (acting commissioner)
- Togoland – Ernst Falkenthal (commissioner)
- Wituland (Deutsch-Witu) – Gustav Denhardt (resident)

== Events ==
- 6 February – German chemist Clemens Winkler discovers chemical element Germanium.
- 14 November – Friedrich Soennecken files his patent for his holepunch Papierlocher für Sammelmappen.
- 15 November – Robert Bosch GmbH is founded.

=== Undated ===
- German Friedrich Soennecken invents the ring binder in Bonn.
- Neuschwanstein Castle is completed.

== Births ==
- Undated – Martin Laurello, German sideshow performer (died 1955)
- Undated – Otto Wunderlich, German landscape photographer (died in 1975)
- 2 January – Carl-Heinrich von Stülpnagel German general (died 1944)
- 25 January – Wilhelm Furtwängler, German conductor and composer (died 1954)
- 14 February – Karl Reinhardt, German philologist (died 1958)
- 6 March – Fritz Goerdeler, German jurist (died 1945)
- 10 March – Eugen Klöpfer, German actor (died 1950)
- 18 March – Lothar von Arnauld de la Perière, German Imperial Naval submarine captain in World War I and Kriegsmarine Rear admiral (died 1941)
- 27 March – Ludwig Mies van der Rohe, German architect (died 1969)
- 16 April – Ernst Thälmann, German politician (died 1944)
- 1 May – Walter Cramer, German businessman (died 1944)
- 2 May – Gottfried Benn, German poet and essayist (died 1956)
- 3 May – Kurt von Briesen, German general (died 1941)
- 5 June – Kurt Hahn, German educator (died 1974)
- 7 August – Paul Westheim, German art historian and publisher (died 1963)
- 15 August – Karl Korsch, German politician (died 1961)
- 19 August – Robert Heger, German conductor (died 1878)
- 20 August – Paul Tillich, Christian existentialist philosopher and Lutheran Protestant theologian (died 1965)
- 25 August – Johannes Stroux, German philologist and writer (died 1954)
- 14 September – Erich Hoepner, German general (died 1944)
- 20 September – Duchess Cecilie of Mecklenburg-Schwerin, German crown princess (died 1954)
- 4 October – Erich Fellgiebel, German general (died 1944)
- 7 October – Kurt Schmitt, German economic leader and the Reich Economy Minister (died 1950)
- 15 October – Rudolf von Marogna-Redwitz, German colonel (died 1944)
- 26 October – Hanns Braun, German athlete (died 2018)
- 6 November – Gus Kahn, German-American songwriter (died 1941)
- 7 November – Reinhold Schünzel, German actor (died 1954)
- 28 November – Cornelius van Oyen, German sport shooter (died 1954)
- 25 December:
  - Gotthard Heinrici, German general (died 1971)
  - Franz Rosenzweig, German theologian and philosopher (died 1929)

== Deaths ==
- 9 April – Joseph Victor von Scheffel, German poet and novelist (born 1826)
- 23 May – Leopold von Ranke, German historian (born 1795)
- 13 June – Ludwig II, King of Bavaria (born 1845)
- 31 July – Franz Liszt, Alleged Symphonic Lich)
