= 1878 in Germany =

- Decades: 1850s; 1860s; 1870s; 1880s; 1890s
- See also: Other events of 1878; History of Germany • Timeline • Years

Events from the year 1878 in Germany.

== Incumbents ==
=== National level ===
- Emperor – William I
- Chancellor – Otto von Bismarck

=== State level ===
==== Kingdoms ====
- King of Bavaria – Ludwig II
- King of Prussia – William I
- King of Saxony – Albert
- King of Württemberg – Charles

==== Grand Duchies ====
- Grand Duke of Baden – Frederick I
- Grand Duke of Hesse – Louis IV
- Grand Duke of Mecklenburg-Schwerin – Frederick Francis II
- Grand Duke of Mecklenburg-Strelitz – Frederick William
- Grand Duke of Oldenburg – Peter II
- Grand Duke of Saxe-Weimar-Eisenach – Charles Alexander

==== Principalities ====
- Schaumburg-Lippe – Adolf I, Prince of Schaumburg-Lippe
- Schwarzburg-Rudolstadt – George Albert, Prince of Schwarzburg-Rudolstadt
- Schwarzburg-Sondershausen – Gonthier Frederick Charles II, Prince of Schwarzburg-Sondershausen
- Principality of Lippe – Woldemar, Prince of Lippe
- Reuss Elder Line – Heinrich XXII, Prince Reuss of Greiz
- Reuss Younger Line – Heinrich XIV, Prince Reuss Younger Line
- Waldeck and Pyrmont –– George Victor, Prince of Waldeck and Pyrmont

==== Duchies ====
- Duke of Anhalt – Frederick I, Duke of Anhalt
- Duke of Brunswick – William, Duke of Brunswick
- Duke of Saxe-Altenburg – Ernst I, Duke of Saxe-Altenburg
- Duke of Saxe-Coburg and Gotha – Ernst II, Duke of Saxe-Coburg and Gotha
- Duke of Saxe-Meiningen – Georg II, Duke of Saxe-Meiningen

== Events ==
- 13 July – Congress of Berlin
- 13 July– Treaty of Berlin
- 30 July – German federal election, 1878
- 19 October – First Anti-Socialist law passed by the German Reichstag

== Births ==
- 4 January – Gerdt von Bassewitz, German playwright and actor (died 1923)
- 16 March – Clemens August Graf von Galen, German bishop of Roman-Catholic Church (died 1946)
- 1 April – Carl Sternheim, German playwright and short story writer (died 1942)
- 6 April – Erich Mühsam, German poet and playwright (died 1934)
- 21 April – Albert Weisgerber, German painter (died 1915)
- 10 May – Gustav Stresemann, Chancellor 1923, Foreign Minister 1923–29, Nobel laureate (died 1929)
- 30 May – Hermine Körner, German actress (died 1960)
- 4 June – Ludwig Dürr, German airship designer (died 1956)
- 10 July – Otto Freundlich, German painter, sculptor (died 1943)
- 16 July – Andreas Hermes, German politician (died 1964)
- 26 July – Ernst Hoppenberg, German swimmer (died 1937)
- 10 August – Alfred Döblin, German novelist, essayist and writer (died 1957)
- 13 August – Arthur Biram, Israeli philosopher, philologist, and educator (died 1967)
- 17 August – Paul Troost, German architect (died 1934)
- 2 September – Werner von Blomberg, German Minister of War, and Commander-in-Chief of the German Armed Forces (died 1946)
- 16 September – Karl Albiker, German sculptor (died 1961)
- 26 September – Kurt von Hammerstein-Equord, German general (died 1943)
- 29 October – Alexander von Falkenhausen, German general (died 1966)
- 30 October – Arthur Scherbius, German electrical engineer (died 1929)
- 21 November – Gustav Radbruch, German legal scholar and politician (died 1949)
- 15 December – Hans Carossa, German novelist (died 1956)
- 30 December – Rudolf Petersen, German politician (died 1962)

== Deaths ==
- 8 March – Wilhelm Siegmund Teuffel, German classical scholar (born 1820)
- 20 March – Julius von Mayer, German physician and physicist (born 1814)
- 23 March – Ernst Keil, German journalist and publisher (born 1816)
- 25 May – Andreas von Ettingshausen, German mathematician and physicist (born 1796)
- 12 June – George V of Hanover, last King of Hanover (born 1819)
- 12 September – Friedrich August von Alberti, German geologist (born 1795)
- 25 September – August Heinrich Petermann, German cartographer (born 1822)
- 4 October – Johannes Rebmann, German missionary (born 1820)
- 4 November – Ludwig Meyn, German agricultural scientist, soil scientist, geologist, journalist and mineralogist (born 1820)
- 17 November – Karl Theodor Keim, Protestant theologian (born 1825)
- 10 December – Heinrich Burgers, German journalist and politician (born 1820)
- 14 December - Grand Duchess of Hesse and by Rhine (born 1843 in the United Kingdom)
- 16 December – Richard Hartmann, German engineering manufacturer (born 1809)
