= 1815 in Germany =

- Decades: 1800s; 1810s; 1820s; 1830s
- See also: Other events of 1815; History of Germany • Timeline • Years

Events from the year 1815 in Germany.

== Incumbents ==
=== Kingdoms ===
- Kingdom of Prussia
  - Monarch – Frederick William III (16 November 1797 – 7 June 1840)
- Kingdom of Bavaria
  - Maximilian I (1 January 1806 – 13 October 1825)
- Kingdom of Saxony
  - Frederick Augustus I (20 December 1806 – 5 May 1827)
- Kingdom of Hanover
  - George III (25 October 1760 –29 January 1820)
- Kingdom of Württemberg
  - Frederick I (22 December 1797 – 30 October 1816)

=== Grand Duchies ===
- Grand Duke of Baden
  - Charles 10 June 1811 – 8 December 1818
- Grand Duke of Hesse
  - Louis I (14 August 1806 – 6 April 1830)
- Grand Duke of Mecklenburg-Schwerin
  - Frederick Francis I– (24 April 1785 – 1 February 1837)
- Grand Duke of Mecklenburg-Strelitz
  - Charles II (2 June 1794 – 6 November 1816)
- Grand Duke of Oldenburg
  - Wilhelm (6 July 1785 –2 July 1823 ) Due to mental illness, Wilhelm was duke in name only, with his cousin Peter, Prince-Bishop of Lübeck, acting as regent throughout his entire reign.
  - Peter I (2 July 1823 - 21 May 1829)
- Grand Duke of Saxe-Weimar-Eisenach
  - Karl August (1809–1815)

=== Principalities ===
- Schaumburg-Lippe
  - George William (13 February 1787 - 1860)
- Schwarzburg-Rudolstadt
  - Friedrich Günther (28 April 1807 - 28 June 1867)
- Schwarzburg-Sondershausen
  - Günther Friedrich Karl I (14 October 1794 - 19 August 1835)
- Principality of Lippe
  - Leopold II (5 November 1802 - 1 January 1851)
- Principality of Reuss-Greiz
  - Heinrich XIII (28 June 1800-29 January 1817)
- Waldeck and Pyrmont
  - George II (9 September 1813 - 15 May 1845)

=== Duchies ===
- Duke of Anhalt-Dessau
  - Leopold III (16 December 1751 – 9 August 1817)
- Duke of Brunswick
  - Frederick William (16 October 1806 – 16 June 1815)
  - Charles II (16 June 1815 – 9 September 1830)
- Duke of Saxe-Altenburg
  - Duke of Saxe-Hildburghausen (1780–1826) - Frederick
- Duke of Saxe-Coburg and Gotha
  - Ernest I (9 December 1806 – 12 November 1826)
- Duke of Saxe-Meiningen
  - Bernhard II (24 December 1803–20 September 1866)
- Duke of Schleswig-Holstein-Sonderburg-Beck
  - Frederick Charles Louis (24 February 1775 – 25 March 1816)

== Events ==
- 3 January – Austria, Britain, and Bourbon-restored France form a secret defensive alliance treaty against Prussia and Russia.

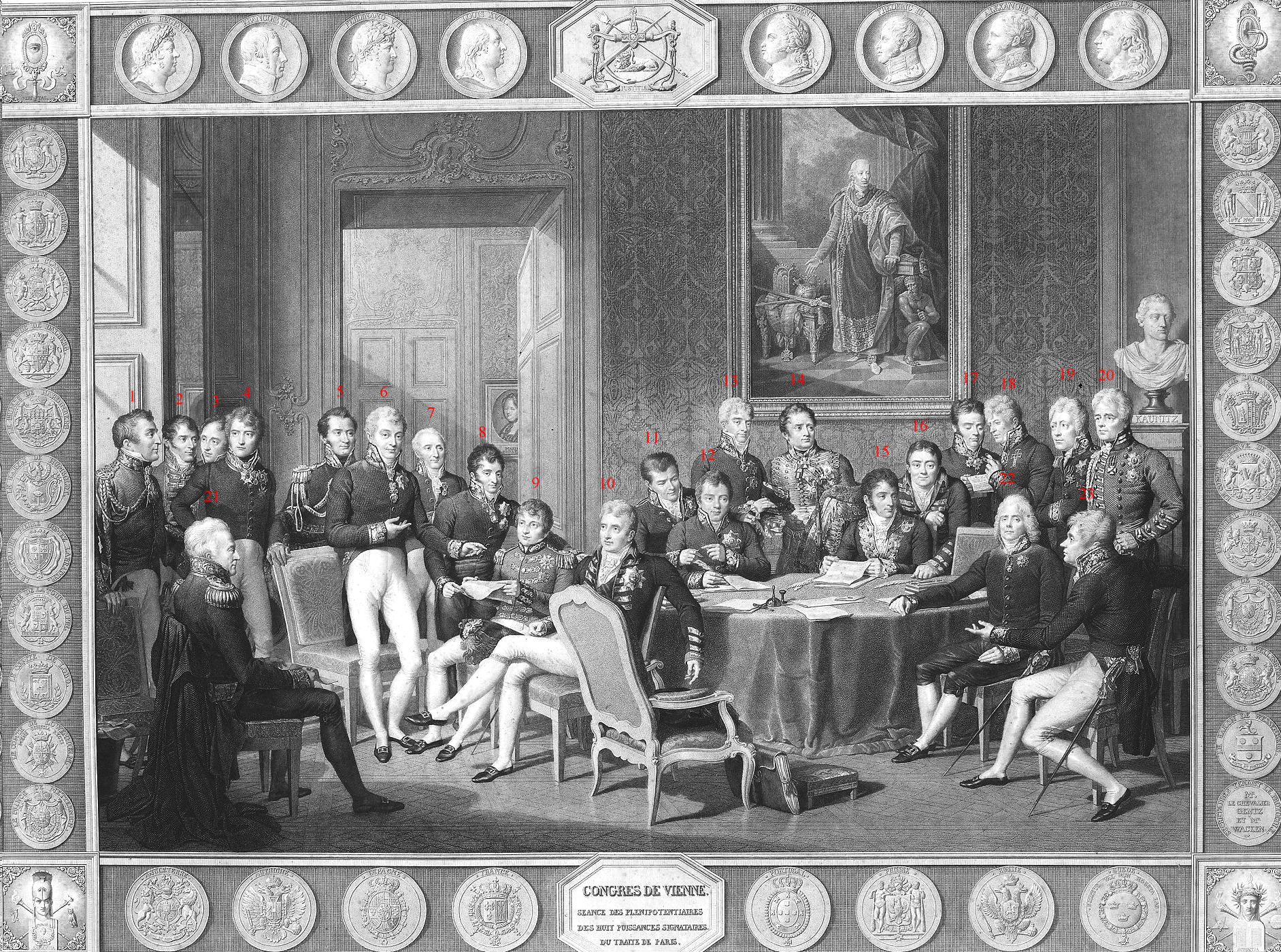
9 June: The Final Act of the Congress of Vienna is signed.

- 9 June – The Final Act of the Congress of Vienna is signed: A new European political situation is set. The German Confederation and Congress Poland are created, and the neutrality of Switzerland is guaranteed. Also, Luxembourg declares independence from the French Empire.
- 16 June-Napoleonic Wars – Battle of Ligny: Napoleon defeats a Prussian army under Gebhard Leberecht von Blücher.
- 2 August – Napoleonic Wars: Representatives of the United Kingdom, Austria, Russia and Prussia sign a convention at Paris, declaring that Napoleon Bonaparte is "their prisoner" and that "His safekeeping is entrusted to the British Government."
- 26 September – Austria, Prussia and Russia sign a Holy Alliance, to uphold the European status quo.
- 20 November – The Napoleonic Wars come to an end after 12 years, with the British government restoring the status quo of France, prior to when the French Revolution began in 1789.

== Births ==
- 15 January – Bertha Wehnert-Beckmann, German photographer (d. 1901)
- 11 March – Anna Bochkoltz, German operatic soprano, voice teacher and composer (d. 1879)
- 1 April- Otto von Bismarck, German statesman (d. 1898)
- 6 April – Robert Volkmann, German composer (d. 1883)
- 18 June – Ludwig Freiherr von und zu der Tann-Rathsamhausen, Bavarian general (d. 1881)
- 26 July – Robert Remak, German embryologist, physiologist and neurologist (d. 1865)
- 31 October – Karl Weierstrass, German mathematician (d. 1897)
- 8 December – Adolph Menzel, German artist, painter (d. 1905)

== Deaths ==
- 5 March – Franz Mesmer, German developer of animal magnetism (b. 1734)
- 11 May – Aletta Haniel, German business person (b. 1742)
- 16 June – Friedrich Wilhelm, Duke of Brunswick-Wolfenbüttel, German noble, general (killed in battle) (b. 1771)
- 3 July – Friedrich Wilhelm von Reden, German pioneer in mining and metallurgy (b. 1752)
