= 1966 in Germany =

- Decades: 1940s; 1950s; 1960s; 1970s; 1980s
- See also: Other events of 1966; History of Germany • Timeline • Years

Events in the year 1966 in Germany.

== Incumbents ==
- President – Heinrich Lübke
- Chancellor
  - Ludwig Erhard (until 30 November 1966)
  - Kurt Georg Kiesinger (from 30 November 1966)

== Events ==
- Germany in the Eurovision Song Contest 1966
- 24 June–5 July – 16th Berlin International Film Festival
- 1 December – The Kiesinger cabinet, led by Kurt Georg Kiesinger, is sworn in.
- Date unknown: German company Hannover Re was founded.

== Births ==
- 30 January – Hans Tutschku, German composer
- 7 February – Claudia Nolte, German politician
- 7 February – Kristin Otto, German swimmer
- 8 February – Bruno Labbadia, German footballer and manager
- 9 February – Christoph Maria Herbst, German actor and comedian
- 16 February – Martin Perscheid, German cartoonist (d. 2021)
- 22 February – Thorsten Kaye, German-English actor
- 26 February – Anette Gersch, German alpine skier
- 18 March – Anne Will, German journalist
- 3 April – Michael Mittermeier, German comedian
- 4 April – Stefan Mappus, German politician
- 19 April – Oliver Welke, German television presenter, actor, comedian and sports journalist
- 21 April – Francis Fulton-Smith, German-British actor
- 3 May – Katrin Göring-Eckardt, German politician
- 8 May – Rocko Schamoni, German entertainer, author and musician
- 9 May – Stefan Quandt, German engineer and industrialist
- 11 May – Christoph Schneider, German musician
- 25 May – Tatjana Patitz, German model and actress (died 2023)
- 28 May – Theo Bleckmann, German vocalist and composer
- 30 May – Thomas Häßler, German football player
- 31 May – Frank Goosen, German cabaret artist and novelist
- 1 June – Sven Rothenberger, German equestrian
- 5 June – Sebastian Krumbiegel, German singer
- 1 July – Zita-Eva Funkenhauser, German fencer
- 7 July – Gundula Krause, German-Irish violinist
- 8 July – Ralf Altmeyer, German virologist
- 14 July – Ralf Waldmann, German motorcycle race (died 2018)
- 18 July – Kathrin Neimke, German track and field athlete
- 23 July – Wolfgang Büchner, German journalist
- 1 August – Axel Oberwelland, German businessman
- 7 August – Stefan Heße, German bishop of Roman Catholic Church
- 20 August – Andreas Hartenfels, German politician
- 25 August – Sandra Maischberger, German journalist
- 7 September – Gunda Niemann-Stirnemann, German speed skater
- 13 September – Maria Furtwängler, German actress
- 19 September – Heiko Maas, German politician
- 22 September – Erdoğan Atalay, German-Turkish actor
- 30 September – Leo Löwenstein, German racing driver (died 2010)
- 8 October – Tabea Zimmermann, German violinist
- 17 October – Donatus, Landgrave of Hesse, German nobleman
- 9 September – Georg Hackl, German luger
- 20 October – Stefan Raab, German television presenter
- 1 November – Barbara Becker, German model
- 16 November – Christian Lorenz, German musician
- 3 December – Bernd Althusmann, German politician

== Deaths ==
- 28 January — Ada Tschechowa, Russo-German actress (born 1916)
- 23 March – August Bach, German politician (born 1897)
- 23 March – Hilde Schrader, German swimmer (born 1910)
- April 13 - Felix von Luckner, German nobleman, author and sailor (born 1881)
- May 8- Erich Pommer, German film producer and executive (born 1889)
- May 10 - Erich Engel, German film and theatre director (born 1891)
- May 24 - Emil Fahrenkamp, German architect (born 1885)
- June 12 - Hermann Scherchen, German conductor (born 1891)
- July 16 - Bernhard Schweitzer, German archaeologist (born 1892)
- July 31 - Alexander von Falkenhausen, German general (born 1878)
- August 22 - Günther Birkenfeld, German writer (born 1901)
- August 29 – Augusta Victoria of Hohenzollern, Queen consort of Portugal in exile (born 1890)
- September 12 - Heinrich Stuhlfauth, German football player and goal keeper (born 1896)
- September 17 — Fritz Wunderlich, singer (born 1930)
- September 19 - Hermann von Oppeln-Bronikowski, equestrian and general (born 1899)
- October 17 - Wieland Wagner, German opera director (born 1917)
- November 19 - Margarete Haagen, German actress (born 1889)
- December 3 - Friedrich Marby, German rune occultist and Germanic revivalist (born 1882)
- December 4 - Renate Ewert, German actress (born 1933)

== See also ==
- 1966 in German television
