= 1960 in German television =

This is a list of German television related events from 1960.

== Events ==
- 6 February – Wyn Hoop is selected to represent Germany at the 1960 Eurovision Song Contest with his song "Bonne nuit ma chérie". He is selected to be the fifth German Eurovision entry during Schlagerparade held at the Rhein-Main-Halle in Wiesbaden.
- 29 March – France wins the Eurovision Song Contest with the song "Tom Pillibi" by Jacqueline Boyer. Germany finish in joint fourth place with Norway.

== Debuts ==
=== ARD ===
- 22 January – Die Firma Hesselbach (1960–1967)
- 21 February – Parkstraße 13 (1960)
- 24 February – Es geschah an der Grenze (1960)
- 22 March – Am grünen Strand der Spree (1960)
- 9 July – Der blaue Heinrich (1960)
- 21 October – The Time Has Come (1960)

=== DFF ===
- 21 March – Der schwarze Kanal (1960–1989)
- 2 October – Heute bei Krügers (1960–1963)
- 19 November – Moabiter Miniaturen (1960–1961)

== Television shows ==
=== 1950s ===
- Tagesschau (1952–present)
