= 1963 in German television =

This is a list of German television related events from 1963.

== Debuts ==
- heute (1963-present)
- Tim Frazer (ARD, 1963–64)

== Television shows ==
=== 1950s ===
- Tagesschau (1952–present) (ard.de)

== Networks and services ==
=== Launches ===
Old network	New network	Type	Conversion date	Notes	Source
ARD 2	ZDF	Cable and satellite	1 April		

== Births ==
- 5 March - Thomas Hermanns, TV host, director & comedian
- 2 July - Jens Riewa, TV host & news analyst
- 10 November - Cordula Stratmann, comedian & TV host
