= 1954 in German television =

This is a list of German television related events from 1954.

== Events ==
- 4 July - West Germany beat Hungary 3-2 to win the 1954 World Cup at Bern, Switzerland.

== Debuts ==
=== ARD ===
- 4 March - Kinderbücher für Erwachsene (1954-1955)
- 2 April - Vater Seidl und sein Sohn (1954)
- 31 July - Der Hauptfilm hat noch nicht begonnen... (1954-1956)
- 15 September - Unsere Nachbarn heute abend: Familie Schölermann (1954-1960)
- 30 November - Die Galerie der großen Detektive (1954)

== Television shows ==
=== 1950s ===
- Tagesschau (1952–present)
