= 1813 in Germany =

- Decades: 1800s; 1810s; 1820s; 1830s
- See also: Other events of 1813; History of Germany • Timeline • Years

Events from the year 1813 in Germany.

== Incumbents ==
=== Kingdoms ===
- Kingdom of Prussia
  - Monarch – Frederick William III (16 November 1797 – 7 June 1840)
- Kingdom of Bavaria
  - Maximilian I (1 January 1806 – 13 October 1825)
- Kingdom of Saxony
  - Frederick Augustus I (20 December 1806 – 5 May 1827)
- Kingdom of Württemberg
  - Frederick I (22 December 1797 – 30 October 1816)

=== Grand Duchies ===
- Grand Duke of Baden
  - Charles 10 June 1811 – 8 December 1818
- Grand Duke of Hesse
  - Louis I (14 August 1806 – 6 April 1830)
- Grand Duke of Mecklenburg-Schwerin
  - Frederick Francis I– (24 April 1785 – 1 February 1837)
- Grand Duke of Mecklenburg-Strelitz
  - Charles II (2 June 1794 – 6 November 1816)
- Grand Duke of Oldenburg
  - Wilhelm (6 July 1785 –2 July 1823 ) Due to mental illness, Wilhelm was duke in name only, with his cousin Peter, Prince-Bishop of Lübeck, acting as regent throughout his entire reign.
  - Peter I (2 July 1823 - 21 May 1829)
- Grand Duke of Saxe-Weimar-Eisenach
  - Karl August (1809–1815)

=== Principalities ===
- Schaumburg-Lippe
  - George William (13 February 1787 - 1860)
- Schwarzburg-Rudolstadt
  - Friedrich Günther (28 April 1807 - 28 June 1867)
- Schwarzburg-Sondershausen
  - Günther Friedrich Karl I (14 October 1794 - 19 August 1835)
- Principality of Lippe
  - Leopold II (5 November 1802 - 1 January 1851)
- Principality of Reuss-Greiz
  - Heinrich XIII (28 June 1800-29 January 1817)
- Waldeck and Pyrmont
  - George I (24 September 1812 – 9 September 1813)
  - George II (9 September 1813 - 15 May 1845)

=== Duchies ===
- Duke of Anhalt-Dessau
  - Leopold III (16 December 1751 – 9 August 1817)
- Duke of Brunswick
  - Frederick William (16 October 1806 – 16 June 1815)
- Duke of Saxe-Altenburg
  - Duke of Saxe-Hildburghausen (1780–1826) - Frederick
- Duke of Saxe-Coburg and Gotha
  - Ernest I (9 December 1806 – 12 November 1826)
- Duke of Saxe-Meiningen
  - Bernhard II (24 December 1803–20 September 1866)
- Duke of Schleswig-Holstein-Sonderburg-Beck
  - Frederick Charles Louis (24 February 1775 – 25 March 1816)

== Events ==
- 9 February – Prussia abolishes the canton system and establishes universal conscription.
- 28 February – Napoleonic Wars: Treaty of Kalisch – Prussia and Russia sign alliance against France
- 4 March – The French garrison evacuates Berlin, leaving Russian troops able to reach and take the city without a fight.
- 14 March – Mecklenburg-Schwerin joins the coalition
- 17 March – Prussia declares war on France, establishes Landwehr and introduces the Iron Cross military award (backdated to 10 March) and issues An Mein Volk proclamation
- 18 March – Russian Cossacks capture Hamburg
- 5 April – Battle of Möckern: Prusso-Russian victory over France
- 20 April – Saxony signs treaty of armed neutrality with Austria
- 21 April – Frederick William III of Prussia establishes the Landsturm
- 25 April – Bavaria announces its neutrality
- 27 April – French garrison of Spandau capitulates
- 2 May – Battle of Lützen – Napoleon wins against the German alliance.
- 20/21 May – Battle of Bautzen – French victory over the coalition
- 26 May – Battle of Haynau – Prussian victory against France
- 31 May – French troops retake Hamburg
- 4 June – Battle of Luckau – Coalition victory
- 4 June – Truce of Pläswitz begins between France, Prussia and Russia
- 14/15/27 June – Treaties of Reichenbach – between Great Britain, Prussia, Russia and Austria
- 12 July – Trachenberg Plan adopted by the Allies
- 11 August – Austria declares war on France
- 16 August – The truce ends
- 23 August – Battle of Großbeeren: Napoleon is defeated by Prussia and Sweden.
- 26 August – Battle of the Katzbach: Napoleon's troops are defeated by Prussia and Russia.
- 26–27 August – Battle of Dresden: Napoleon's troops are victorious.
- 27 August – Battle of Hagelberg: Prusso-Russian victory
- 29–30 August – First Battle of Kulm: French Marshal Vandamme is defeated and captured, by allied Coalition forces from Russia, Prussia and Austria.
- 4 September: In the gaming records of Hans Carl Leopold von der Gabelentz the name of Germany's national card game, "Scat" (now Skat, appears for the time.
- 6 September – Battle of Dennewitz: The armies of Napoleon are defeated by Prussia and Russia.
- 9 September – Treaty of Töplitz – between Prussia, Austria and Russia
- 17 September – Second Battle of Kulm: The Allied Coalition is victorious; Napoleon is forced to halt his advance on Teplitz.
- 18 September – Battle of the Göhrde – Coalition victory
- 28 September – Battle of Altenburg – Coalition victory
- 29 September – Combat of Roßlau – Coalition victory
- 3 October – Battle of Wartenburg – Prussian victory

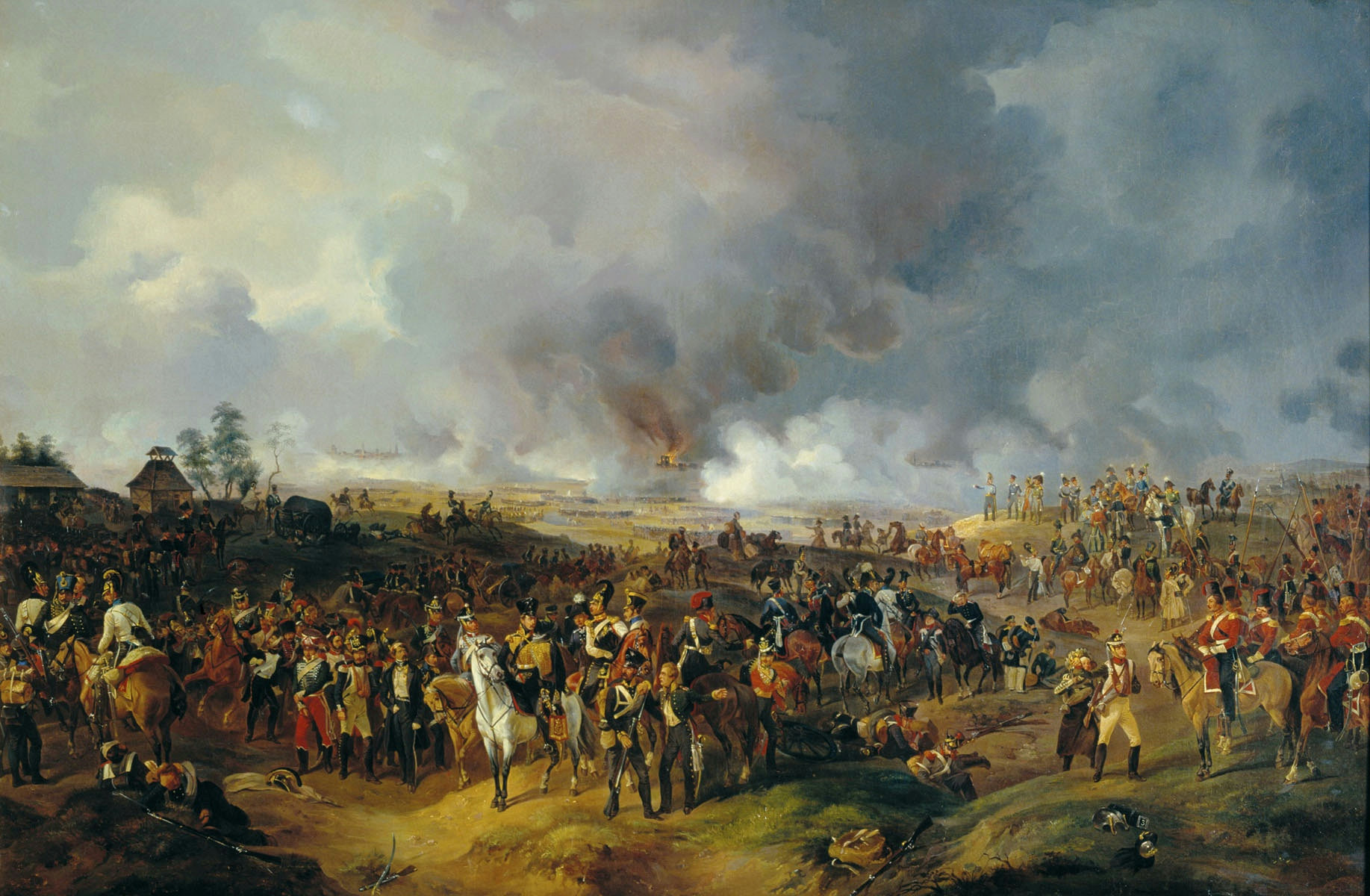
16–19 October: Battle of Leipzig

- 8 October – Treaty of Ried – Bavaria allies with the Coalition against France
- 14 October – Bavaria declares war on France
- 16–19 October – Battle of Leipzig: Napoleon is defeated by the forces of the Sixth Coalition. More than 600,000 troops are in the field, with well over 20% killed, wounded or missing. Many of the German states forming the Confederation of the Rhine defect from Napoleon to the Coalition, as a result of the battle.
- 26 October – King Jérôme leaves Kassel, effectively dissolving the Kingdom of Westphalia
- 30–31 October – Battle of Hanau: Napoleon defeats Bavarian-Austrian force.
- 2 November – Treaty of Fulda – Württemberg joins the Coalition
- 11 November – French garrison of Dresden capitulates
- 20 November – Baden joins the coalition
- 21 November – William I enters Kassel and is restored as Elector of Hesse
- 23 November – Hesse-Darmstadt and Nassau join the coalition
- 7 December – Battle of Bornhöved
- 8 December – Ludwig van Beethoven's Symphony No. 7, together with his Wellington's Victory, are premiered in Vienna under the composer's baton, in a benefit concert for Austrian and Bavarian soldiers wounded at the Battle of Hanau.
- 10 December – Battle of Sehested
- 31 December – Blücher's Army of Silesia crosses the Rhine

== Births ==
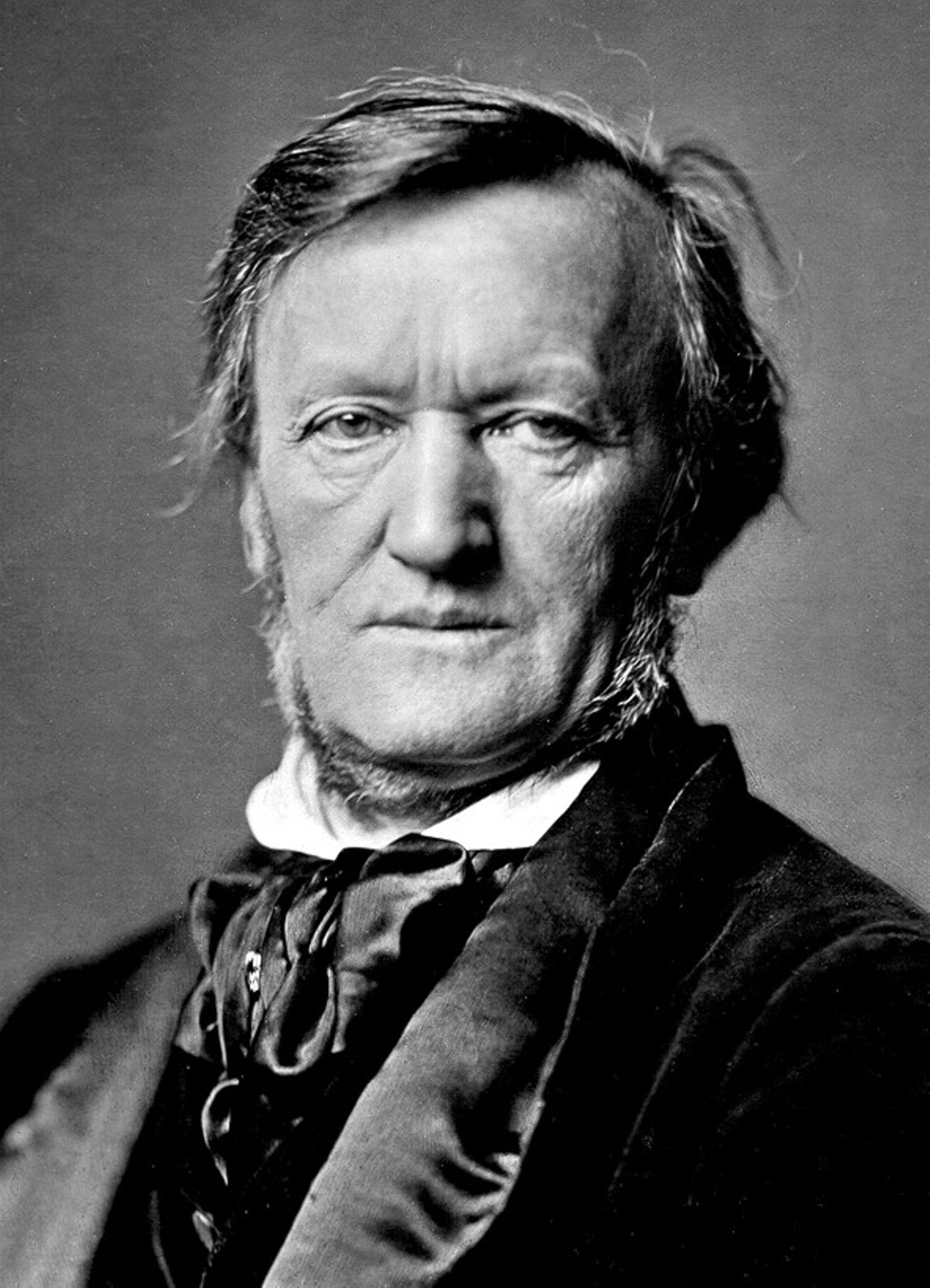
Richard Wagner

- 11 February – Otto Ludwig, German writer (d. 1865)
- 18 March – Christian Friedrich Hebbel, German poet, playwright (d. 1863)
- 1 April – Karl Friedrich August Rammelsberg, German mineralogist (d. 1899)
- 22 May – Richard Wagner, German composer (d. 1883)

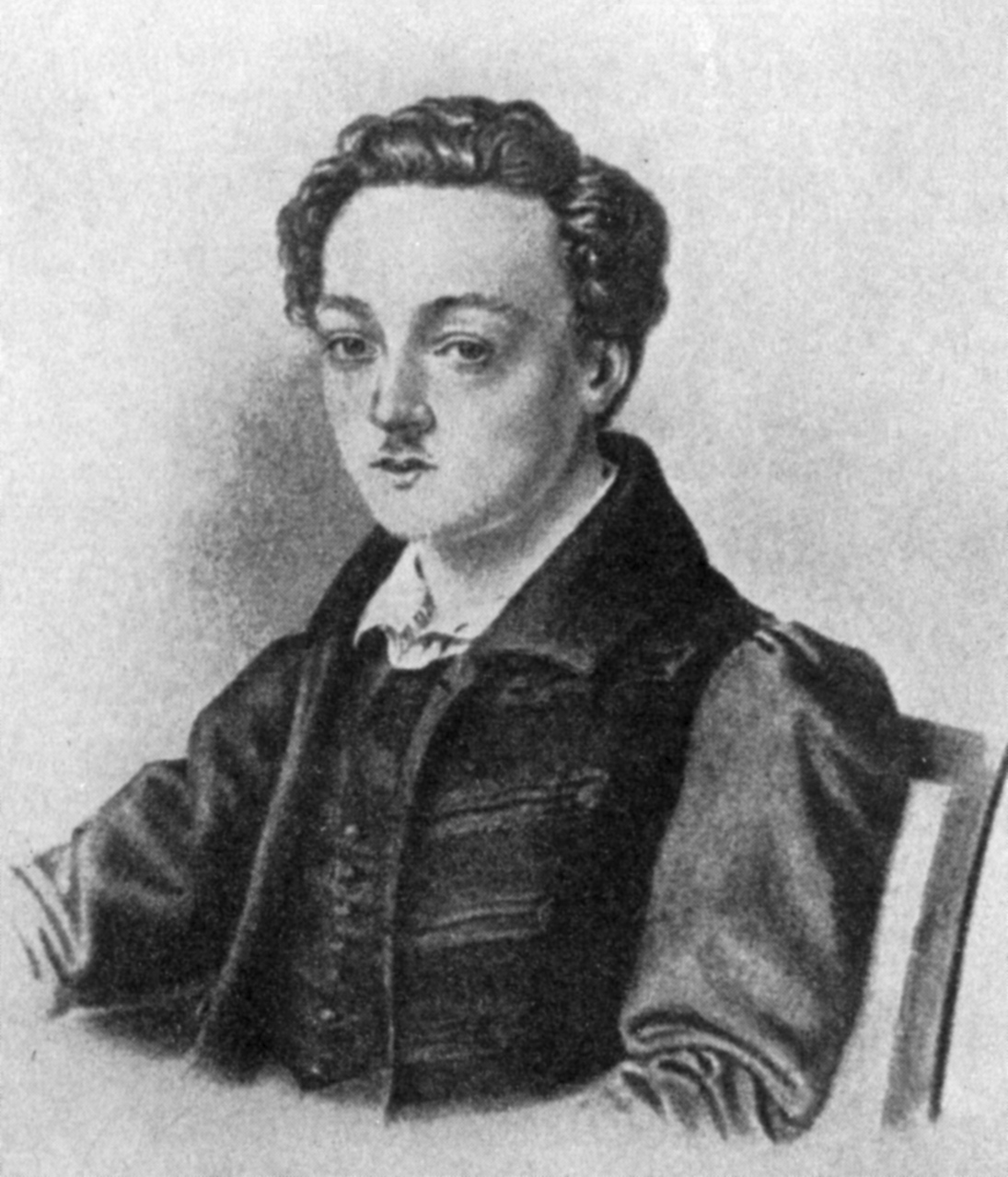
Georg Büchner

- 17 October – Georg Büchner, German playwright (d. 1837)

== Deaths ==
- 20 January –Christoph Martin Wieland, German writer (b. 1733)
- 3 April – Friederike Brion, first great love of Johann Wolfgang Goethe (b. 1752)
- 28 June –Gerhard von Scharnhorst, Prussian general (b. 1755)
- 26 August – Theodor Körner, German author, soldier (b. 1791)
