= Hermann Baumgarten =

German historian and political publicist

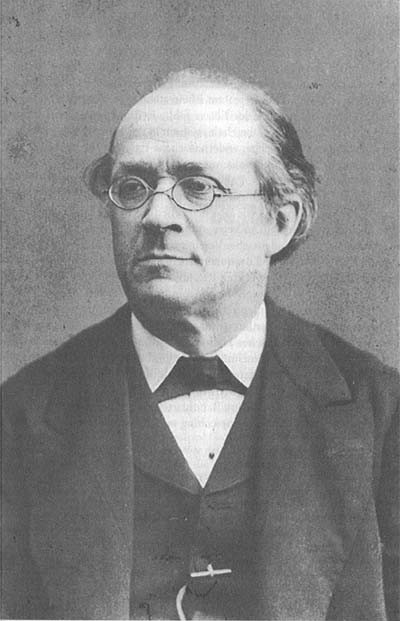
- Born: 28 April 1825; Wolfenbüttel, Duchy of Brunswick
- Died: 19 June 1893 (aged 68); Strasbourg, Alsace–Lorraine, German Empire
- Occupation: Historian
- Notable work: A Self-Criticism of German Liberalism (1866)
- Spouse: Ida Baumgarten

Hermann Baumgarten (/ˈbaʊmɡɑːrtən/; German: [ˈbaʊmˌgaʁtn̩]; 28 April 1825 – 19 June 1893) was a German historian and political publicist whose work had a major impact on liberalism during the unification of Germany. Baumgarten's philosophy also created a significant political impression on Max Weber, an influential social theorist of the late 19th and early 20th centuries.

== Life and career ==
Hermann Baumgarten was born in Wolfenbüttel in the Duchy of Brunswick. He studied philology and history at the University of Jena before becoming a journalist in 1855. In 1859, he began working at Maximilian Duncker's "literary bureau", a Prussian institution used to disseminate propaganda. In 1861, he also took up a teaching post at the Technical University of Karlsruhe.

As a champion of Prussian/German liberalism, Baumgarten faced the dilemma as to whether or not to accept the military and political successes of Prussia's conservative Prime Minister, Otto von Bismarck. In 1866, Baumgarten published his support of Bismarck's policies in an essay entitled A Self-Criticism of German Liberalism. This work ended radical German liberalism as a force, and many Prussians joined the Bismarck-supporting National Liberal Party), allowing the new German Empire to nationalize and solidify.

In 1872, Baumgarten became Professor of History at the Reichsuniversität in Strasbourg. During the late 1880s and early 1890s, Baumgarten made a significant political impression upon Max Weber, Baumgarten's nephew by marriage. Weber would go on to profoundly influence social theory and the remit of sociology itself. On 19 June 1893, at the age of 68, Baumgarten died in Strasbourg, Alsace–Lorraine.

== Works ==
- Der deutsche Liberalismus: Eine Selbstkritik ("A Self-Criticism of German Liberalism") (Berlin, 1866)
- Notes on Treitschke's "German History", 2nd Vol. (Anmerkungen zu Treitschkes „Deutsche Geschichte“, 2. Band., Strasbourg, 1883)
