= Birgit Havenstein =

German flautist and composer (born 1954)

Birgit Havenstein (born 4 January 1954) is a German flautist and composer. She was born in Berlin, and studied music and music education at the Städtisches Konservatorium. At the 1988 Sommerliche Musiktage Hitzacker she won awards for her Graffiti for flute, cello and harp.

== Selected works ==
- Even the earth gave his secrets for violin, alto sax and piano, 1992
- Music on an absent cellist for solo harp, 1993
- Tempelglocken verstummen, Blütenduft bleibt for flute, clarinet, violin, viola, cello and piano
- Graffiti for flute, cello and harp, 1988
