= Treaty of Töplitz =

1813 treaty between Russia, Austria, and Prussia

The Treaty of Töplitz (other spellings: Treaty of Toeplitz, Treaty of Toplitz) was signed in Töplitz on 9 September 1813, between Russia, Austria, and Prussia. The purpose of the agreement was to establish and strengthen a united coalition force against Napoleon I of France. Based on the terms of the accord, all signatories agreed to support each other with 60,000 troops. Another Treaty of Töplitz was signed between Great Britain and Austria.

== See also ==
- List of treaties

== Sources ==
- Clare, Israel Smith. Library of Universal History: Containing a Record of the Human Race from the Earliest Historical Period to the Present Time Embracing a General Survey of the Progress of Mankind in National and Social Life, Civil Government, Religion, Literature, Science and Art. R. S. Peale, J. A. Hill, 1897 (Original from the New York Public Library).
