= 1880 in Germany =

- Decades: 1860s; 1870s; 1880s; 1890s; 1900s
- See also: Other events of 1880; History of Germany • Timeline • Years

Events from the year 1880 in Germany.

== Incumbents ==
=== National level ===
- Emperor – William I
- Chancellor – Otto von Bismarck

=== State level ===
==== Kingdoms ====
- King of Bavaria – Ludwig II
- King of Prussia – William I
- King of Saxony – Albert
- King of Württemberg – Charles

==== Grand Duchies ====
- Grand Duke of Baden – Frederick I
- Grand Duke of Hesse – Louis IV
- Grand Duke of Mecklenburg-Schwerin – Frederick Francis II
- Grand Duke of Mecklenburg-Strelitz – Frederick William
- Grand Duke of Oldenburg – Peter II
- Grand Duke of Saxe-Weimar-Eisenach – Charles Alexander

==== Principalities ====
- Schaumburg-Lippe – Adolf I, Prince of Schaumburg-Lippe
- Schwarzburg-Rudolstadt – George Albert, Prince of Schwarzburg-Rudolstadt
- Schwarzburg-Sondershausen – Gonthier Frederick Charles II, Prince of Schwarzburg-Sondershausen to 17 July, then Charles Gonthier, Prince of Schwarzburg-Sondershausen
- Principality of Lippe – Woldemar, Prince of Lippe
- Reuss Elder Line – Heinrich XXII, Prince Reuss of Greiz
- Reuss Younger Line – Heinrich XIV, Prince Reuss Younger Line
- Waldeck and Pyrmont – George Victor, Prince of Waldeck and Pyrmont

==== Duchies ====
- Duke of Anhalt – Frederick I, Duke of Anhalt
- Duke of Brunswick – William, Duke of Brunswick
- Duke of Saxe-Altenburg – Ernst I, Duke of Saxe-Altenburg
- Duke of Saxe-Coburg and Gotha – Ernst II, Duke of Saxe-Coburg and Gotha
- Duke of Saxe-Meiningen – Georg II, Duke of Saxe-Meiningen

== Events ==
- 3 April – German company Munich Re is founded.
- 14 August – Construction of the Cologne Cathedral is finally completed after over 600 years.

=== Undated ===
- German company Bilfinger is founded.

== Births ==
- 8 February – Franz Marc, German painter (died 1916)
- 21 February – Waldemar Bonsels, German writer (died 1952)
- 10 April – Hans Purrmann, German painter (died 1966)
- 6 May – Ernst Ludwig Kirchner, German painter, draftsman, printmaker, sculptor, and writer (died 1938)
- 14 May – Wilhelm List, German field marshal (died 1971)
- 15 May – F. K. Otto Dibelius, German bishop of the Evangelical Church in Berlin-Brandenburg (died 1967)
- 29 May – Oswald Spengler, German historian (died 1936)
- 25 June – Erich Emminger, German politician (died 1951)
- 29 June – Ludwig Beck, German general (died 1944)
- 1 July – Herbert Koch, German archaeologist (died 1962)
- 3 July – Carl Schuricht, German conductor (died 1967)
- 11 July
  - Dorothea Köring, German tennis player (died 1945)
  - Friedrich Lahrs, German architect (died 1964)
- 12 July – Prince Friedrich Wilhelm of Prussia, Prussian nobleman (died 1925)
- 5 August – Hermann Lüdemann, German politician (died 1959)
- 30 August – Konrad von Preysing, German prelate of Roman-Catholic Church (died 1950)
- 14 September – Karl Kimmich, German banker (died 1945)
- 28 September – Otto Sackur, German physical chemist (died 1914)
- 14 October – Bruno Heinemann, German officer (died 1918)
- 1 November – Alfred Wegener, German polar researcher, geophysicist and meteorologist (died 1930)
- 11 November – Alexander Behm, German physicist (died 1952)
- 20 November – Walter Brack, German swimmer (died 1919)
- 3 December – Fedor von Bock, German field marshal (died 1945)

== Deaths ==
- 4 January – Anselm Feuerbach, German painter (born 1829)
- 4 January – Karl Friedrich Lessing, German painter (born 1808)
- 12 January – Ida, Countess von Hahn-Hahn, German author and novelist (born 1805)
- 12 February – Karl von Holtei, German poet and actor (born 1798)
- 15 February – Ernst August Hagen, German writer and novelist (born 1797)
- 17 February – Paul Mendelssohn Bartholdy, German chemist (born 1841)
- 29 March – Heinrich Bernhard Oppenheim, German publicist and philosopher (born 1819)
- 6 May – Friedrich Bayer, German entrepreneur (born 1825)
- 22 May – Heinrich von Gagern, German politician (born 1799)
- 13 June – Heinrich Strack, German architect (born 1805)
- 18 August - Baron Karl Ludwig von der Pfordten, German attorney and politician (born 1811)
- 30 August – Hermann Anschütz, German painter (born 1802)
- 13 December – Martin Gropius, German architect (born 1824)
