= 1888 in Germany =

- Decades: 1860s; 1870s; 1880s; 1890s; 1900s
- See also: Other events of 1888; History of Germany • Timeline • Years

Events in the year 1888 in Germany, the 'Year of the Three Emperors'.

== Incumbents ==
=== National level ===
- Emperor:
  - William I (until 9 March)
  - Frederick III (9 March to 15 June)
  - Wilhelm II (since 15 June)
- Chancellor – Otto von Bismarck

=== State level ===
==== Kingdoms ====
- King of Bavaria – Otto
- King of Prussia – William I to 9 March, then Frederick III to 15 June, then Wilhelm II
- King of Saxony – Albert
- King of Württemberg – Charles

==== Grand Duchies ====
- Grand Duke of Baden – Frederick I
- Grand Duke of Hesse – Louis IV
- Grand Duke of Mecklenburg-Schwerin – Frederick Francis III
- Grand Duke of Mecklenburg-Strelitz – Frederick William
- Grand Duke of Oldenburg – Peter II
- Grand Duke of Saxe-Weimar-Eisenach – Charles Alexander

==== Principalities ====
- Schaumburg-Lippe – Adolf I, Prince of Schaumburg-Lippe
- Schwarzburg-Rudolstadt – George Albert, Prince of Schwarzburg-Rudolstadt
- Schwarzburg-Sondershausen – Karl Günther, Prince of Schwarzburg-Sondershausen
- Principality of Lippe – Woldemar, Prince of Lippe
- Reuss Elder Line – Heinrich XXII, Prince Reuss of Greiz
- Reuss Younger Line – Heinrich XIV, Prince Reuss Younger Line
- Waldeck and Pyrmont – George Victor, Prince of Waldeck and Pyrmont

==== Duchies ====
- Duke of Anhalt – Frederick I, Duke of Anhalt
- Duke of Brunswick – Prince Albert of Prussia (regent)
- Duke of Saxe-Altenburg – Ernst I, Duke of Saxe-Altenburg
- Duke of Saxe-Coburg and Gotha – Ernst II, Duke of Saxe-Coburg and Gotha
- Duke of Saxe-Meiningen – Georg II, Duke of Saxe-Meiningen

==== Colonial Governors ====
- Cameroon (Kamerun) – Eugen von Zimmerer (1st term) to 17 January, then Julius Freiherr von Soden (2nd term)
- German East Africa (Deutsch-Ostafrika) – Karl Peters (administrator) to 8 February, then Hermann Wissmann (commissioner) (1st term)
- German New Guinea (Deutsch-Neuguinea) – Georg Freiherr von Schleinitz to 1 March, then Reinhold Kraetke (both Landeshauptleute of the German New Guinea Company)
- German South-West Africa (Deutsch-Südwestafrika) – Heinrich Ernst Göring (acting commissioner)
- Togoland – Jesko von Puttkamer (acting commissioner) (1st term) to 17 October, then Eugen von Zimmerer (commissioner)
- Wituland (Deutsch-Witu) – Gustav Denhardt (resident)

== Events ==
- 9 March – Emperor Wilhelm I dies at the age of 90 in Berlin. He is succeeded by his oldest son Friedrich Wilhelm, who becomes Friedrich III.
- 16 April – The German Empire annexes the island of Nauru
- 15 June – Wilhelm II becomes German Emperor after the death of his father, Friedrich III.
- 13 December – Heinrich Hertz presents his report on the discovery of electromagnetic radiation to the Berlin Academy of Sciences

== Literature ==
- 'Theses on Feuerbach' by Karl Marx is published posthumously

== Music ==
- Johannes Brahms – Violin Sonata in D Minor (opus 108)
- Max Reger – String Quartet in D minor (with double bass obbligato; without op.) (1888–89)
- Joseph Rheinberger — Organ Sonata No. 12 in D-flat, Op. 154
- Richard Strauss
  - Don Juan, Macbeth (first version)
- Carl Maria von Weber's opera Die drei Pintos completed posthumously by Theodor Hell

== Sport ==
- Establishment of association football clubs BFC Germania, TGM SV Jügesheim and KBC Duisburg

== Miscellaneous ==
- First buildings of the Berufsgenossenschaftliches Universitätsklinikum Bergmannsheil opened

== Births ==
- 14 January – Karl Badberger, architect (date of death unknown)
- 17 February – Otto Stern, German physicist and Nobel Prize laureate (died 1969)
- 27 February – Lotte Lehmann, German soprano (died 1976)
- 4 March – Emma Richter, German paleontologist (died 1956)
- 14 March:
  - Peretz Naftali, German-born Israeli politician (died 1961)
  - Hermann Reinecke, Wehrmacht general and convicted war criminal (died 1973)
- 19 March – Josef Albers, German-American artist (died 1976)
- 17 April – Herms Niel, German composer (died 1954)
- 24 July – Hermann von Bönninghausen, German athlete and soldier in World War I (died 1919)
- 25 July – Wilhelm Fritz von Roettig, German Waffen SS general (died 1939)
- 4 September – Oskar Schlemmer, German painter, sculptor and choreographer (died 1943)
- 20 December – Yitzhak Baer, Israeli historian (died 1980)

== Deaths ==
- 9 March – William I, Emperor of Germany and King of Prussia (born 1797)
- 5 April – Eduard Karl August Riehm, German Protestant theologian (born 1830)
- 16 April – Friedrich Grillo, German industrialist (born 1825)
- 15 June – Frederick III, Emperor of Germany and King of Prussia (born 1831)
- 20 June – Karl Friedrich August Kahnis, German Protestant theologian (born 1814)
- 20 July – Paul Langerhans German pathologist, physiologist and biologist (born 1847)
- 23 July – Johannes Heinrich August Ebrard, German Protestant theologian (born 1818)
- 24 August – Rudolf Clausius, German physicist and mathematician (born 1822)
- 28 August – Georg Beseler, German politician and jurist (born 1809)
- 12 September – August von Werder, German general (born 1808)
- 3 December – Carl Zeiss, German entrepreneur and scientist (born 1816)
