= Ernst Pfeiffer =

German entomologist

Ernst Pfeiffer (20 December 1893, Munich – 28 May 1955, Munich) was a German entomologist who specialised in Lepidoptera He was a publisher and bookseller. Pfeiffer made numerous collecting trips to Hungary, Dalmatia, Bulgaria, and Persia. He published many scientific papers on Rhopalocera in Mitteilungen der Münchner Entomologischen Gesellschaft and with Osthelder edited Lepidopteren-Fauna von Marasch in türkisch Nordsyrien in the same journal. His collection of Palearctic and Nearctic butterflies is in the Munich zoological museum Zoologische Staatssammlung München.
