= 1816 in Germany =

- Decades: 1800s; 1810s; 1820s; 1830s
- See also: Other events of 1816; History of Germany • Timeline • Years

Events from the year 1816 in Germany.

== Incumbents ==
=== Kingdoms ===
- Kingdom of Prussia
  - Monarch – Frederick William III (16 November 1797 – 7 June 1840)
- Kingdom of Bavaria
  - Maximilian I (1 January 1806 – 13 October 1825)
- Kingdom of Saxony
  - Frederick Augustus I (20 December 1806 – 5 May 1827)
- Kingdom of Hanover
  - George III (25 October 1760 –29 January 1820)
- Kingdom of Württemberg
  - Frederick I (22 December 1797 – 30 October 1816)
  - William (30 October 1816 – 25 June 1864)

=== Grand Duchies ===
- Grand Duke of Baden
  - Charles 10 June 1811 – 8 December 1818
- Grand Duke of Hesse
  - Louis I (14 August 1806 – 6 April 1830)
- Grand Duke of Mecklenburg-Schwerin
  - Frederick Francis I– (24 April 1785 – 1 February 1837)
- Grand Duke of Mecklenburg-Strelitz
  - Charles II (2 June 1794 – 6 November 1816)
  - George (6 November 1816 – 6 September 1860)
- Grand Duke of Oldenburg
  - Wilhelm (6 July 1785 –2 July 1823 ) Due to mental illness, Wilhelm was duke in name only, with his cousin Peter, Prince-Bishop of Lübeck, acting as regent throughout his entire reign.
  - Peter I (2 July 1823 - 21 May 1829)
- Grand Duke of Saxe-Weimar-Eisenach
  - Charles Frederick (14 June 1828 - 8 July 1853)

=== Principalities ===
- Schaumburg-Lippe
  - George William (13 February 1787 - 1860)
- Schwarzburg-Rudolstadt
  - Friedrich Günther (28 April 1807 - 28 June 1867)
- Schwarzburg-Sondershausen
  - Günther Friedrich Karl I (14 October 1794 - 19 August 1835)
- Principality of Lippe
  - Leopold II (5 November 1802 - 1 January 1851)
- Principality of Reuss-Greiz
  - Heinrich XIII (28 June 1800 – 29 January 1817)
- Waldeck and Pyrmont
  - George II (9 September 1813 - 15 May 1845)

=== Duchies ===
- Duke of Anhalt-Dessau
  - Leopold III (16 December 1751 – 9 August 1817)
- Duke of Brunswick
  - Charles II (16 June 1815 – 9 September 1830)
- Duke of Saxe-Altenburg
  - Duke of Saxe-Hildburghausen (1780–1826) - Frederick
- Duke of Saxe-Coburg and Gotha
  - Ernest I (9 December 1806 – 12 November 1826)
- Duke of Saxe-Meiningen
  - Bernhard II (24 December 1803 – 20 September 1866)
- Duke of Schleswig-Holstein-Sonderburg-Beck
  - Frederick Charles Louis (24 February 1775 – 25 March 1816)
  - Frederick William (25 March 1816 – 6 July 1825)

== Events ==
- January 9 – Ludwig van Beethoven obtains custody of his nephew Karl, after a legal battle with the boy's mother.
- 10 February – Friedrich Karl Ludwig, Duke of Schleswig-Holstein-Sonderburg-Beck, dies and is succeeded by Friedrich Wilhelm, his son and founder of the House of Glücksburg.
- April 17 – Josef von Spaun writes to Johann Wolfgang von Goethe for permission to have his poems set to music by the youthful Franz Schubert.
- July 13 – Carl Maria von Weber meets Count Vitzthum von Eckstädt at Carlsbad; the encounter leads to Weber being appointed Kapellmeister at Dresden.
- October 2 – Johann Nepomuk Hummel is offered a post at Stuttgart by Duke Frederick I of Württemberg.
- November 19 – Carl Maria von Weber becomes engaged to soprano Caroline Brandt.
- Ludwig van Beethoven : To the distant beloved op. 98 (song cycle); Der Mann von Wort - Lied Op. 99; Piano Sonata No. 28 op.101 (completed in 1816, premiered in 1817)
- Johann Simon Mayr : 6 cantatas ( Egeria, Annibale, Lo spavento, La tempesta, Le Festivals d'Ercole, L'armonia )
- Carl Maria von Weber : Piano Sonata No. 2 in A flat major op. 39; Piano Sonata No. 3 in D minor, Op. 49; Grand Duo concertant for clarinet and piano in E flat major op.48 (chamber music)
- Franz Bopp – Über das Conjugationssystem der Sanskritsprache in Vergleichung mit jenem der griechischen, lateinischen, persischen und germanischen Sprache (On the Conjugation System of Sanskrit in comparison with that of Greek, Latin, Persian and Germanic)
- Pinkus Müller brewery established.
- Province of Saxony established
- Province of Brandenburg established
- The Neue Wache, a listed building on Unter den Linden boulevard in the historic centre of Berlin. Erected from 1816 to 1818.

== Births ==
- 24 May – Emanuel Leutze, German-American painter (d. 1868)

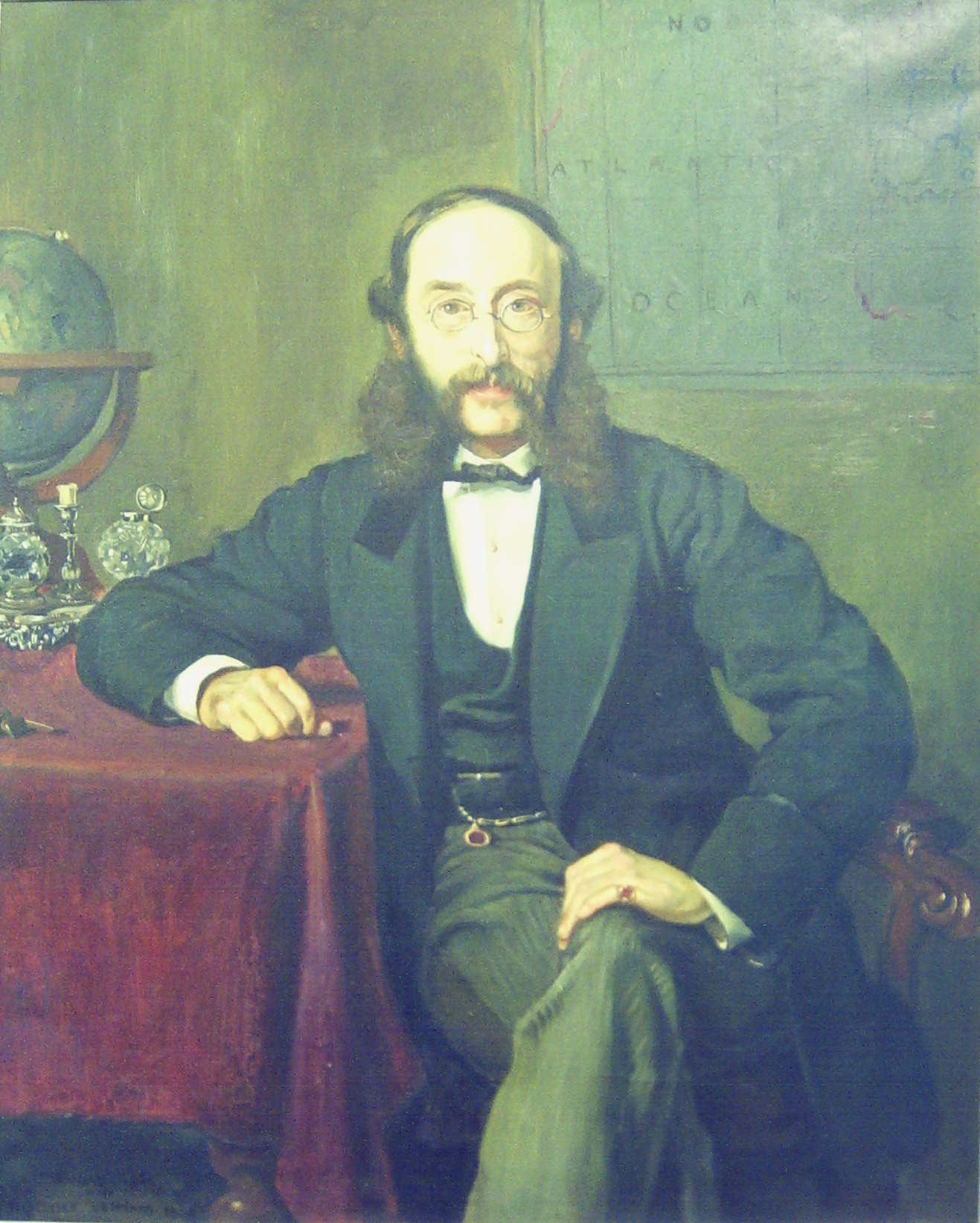
Paul Reuter

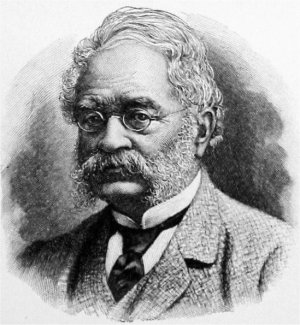
Werner von Siemens

- 21 July – Paul Reuter, German entrepreneur (d. 1899)
- 11 September – Carl Zeiss, German maker of optical instruments (d. 1888)
- November 1 – Friedrich Wilhelm Hackländer, German novelist, dramatist and travel writer (died 1877)
- 10 December – August Karl von Goeben, Prussian general (d. 1880)
- 13 December – Werner von Siemens, German inventor, industrialist (d. 1892)
- 29 December – Carl Ludwig, German physician, physiologist (d. 1895)

== Deaths ==
- 3 March – Johann August von Starck, German pastor (b. 1741)
- April 28 – Johann Heinrich Abicht, German philosopher (born 1762)
- 9 August – Johann August Apel, German writer, jurist (b. 1771)
- 29 August – Johann Hieronymus Schröter, German astronomer (b. 1745)
- 6 November – Charles II, Grand Duke of Mecklenburg-Strelitz (b. 1741)
- Christian Gottlob Fechhelm, German portrait and historical painter (born 1732)
