= 1883 in Germany =

- Decades: 1860s; 1870s; 1880s; 1890s; 1900s
- See also: Other events of 1883; History of Germany • Timeline • Years

Events in the year 1883 in Germany.

== Incumbents ==
=== National level ===
- Emperor – William I
- Chancellor – Otto von Bismarck

=== State level ===
==== Kingdoms ====
- King of Bavaria – Ludwig II
- King of Prussia – William I
- King of Saxony – Albert
- King of Württemberg – Charles

==== Grand Duchies ====
- Grand Duke of Baden – Frederick I
- Grand Duke of Hesse – Louis IV
- Grand Duke of Mecklenburg-Schwerin – Frederick Francis II
- Grand Duke of Mecklenburg-Strelitz – Frederick William
- Grand Duke of Oldenburg – Peter II
- Grand Duke of Saxe-Weimar-Eisenach – Charles Alexander

==== Principalities ====
- Schaumburg-Lippe – Adolf I, Prince of Schaumburg-Lippe
- Schwarzburg-Rudolstadt – George Albert, Prince of Schwarzburg-Rudolstadt
- Schwarzburg-Sondershausen – Charles Gonthier, Prince of Schwarzburg-Sondershausen
- Principality of Lippe – Woldemar, Prince of Lippe
- Reuss Elder Line – Heinrich XXII, Prince Reuss of Greiz
- Reuss Younger Line – Heinrich XIV, Prince Reuss Younger Line
- Waldeck and Pyrmont – George Victor, Prince of Waldeck and Pyrmont

==== Duchies ====
- Duke of Anhalt – Frederick I, Duke of Anhalt
- Duke of Brunswick – William, Duke of Brunswick
- Duke of Saxe-Altenburg – Ernst I, Duke of Saxe-Altenburg
- Duke of Saxe-Coburg and Gotha – Ernst II, Duke of Saxe-Coburg and Gotha
- Duke of Saxe-Meiningen – Georg II, Duke of Saxe-Meiningen

== Events ==
- 12 May – A German merchant Adolf Lüderitz purchases and takes possession of land in South-West Africa, which subsequently forms the basis of the first German colony of German South-West Africa (Deutsch-Südwestafrika).

=== Undated ===
- German company AEG is founded in Berlin.
- Germany gets the world's first national social health insurance system by legislation of Otto von Bismarck's social legislation, which included the Health Insurance Bill of 1883.
- The Schotten-Baumann reaction is first described in 1883 by German chemists Carl Schotten and Eugen Baumann.
- The Suermondt-Ludwig-Museum in Aachen is opened.

== Births ==
- 12 January – Gustav Otto, aircraft engineer (died 1926)
- 19 January – Hermann Abendroth, German conductor (died 1956)
- 31 January – Hermann Höpker-Aschoff, German judge and politician (died 1954)
- 16 February – Conrad Hommel, German painter (died 1971)
- 9 February – Fritz August Breuhaus, German architect, interior designer and designer (died 1960)
- 17 February – Selma Lohse, German politician (died 1937)
- 23 February – Otto Nuschke, German politician (died 1957)
- 23 February – Karl Jaspers, German psychiatrist and philosopher (died 1969)
- 8 March – Adolf Köster, German diplomat and politician (died 1930)
- 13 March – Eugen Ritter von Schobert, German general (died 1941)
- 18 May – Walter Gropius, German architect (died 1969)
- 18 May – Theodor Loos, German actor (died 1954)
- 7 July – Prince Eitel Friedrich of Prussia, German nobleman (died 1942)
- 10 July – Johannes Blaskowitz, German general (died 1948)
- 10 July – Friedrich Flick, German entrepreneur and industrialist (died 1972)
- 7 August – Joachim Ringelnatz, German writer (died 1934)
- 20 August – Robert Lehr, German politician (died 1956)
- 11 September – Emil Rausch, German swimmer (died 1954)
- 17 September – Käthe Kruse, notable pioneer of German doll-making (died 1968)
- 14 September – Martin Dibelius, German academic theologian and New Testament professor at the University of Heidelberg (died 1947)
- 24 September – Wilhelm Stählin, German Lutheran theologian, bishop, preacher (died 1975)
- 30 September – Bernhard Rust, Education Minister of Nazi Germany (died 1945)
- 8 October – Otto Heinrich Warburg, German physiologist, medical doctor and Nobel laureate (died 1970)
- 25 October – Walter Alfred Rosam, German painter (died 1916)
- 15 November – Günther Rüdel, German general (died 1950)

== Deaths ==
- 19 January – Georg Ferdinand Howaldt, German sculptor (born 1802)
- 21 January – Prince Charles of Prussia, German nobleman and Prussian general (born 1801)
- 24 January – Friedrich von Flotow, German composer (born 1812)
- 13 February – Richard Wagner, German composer (born 1813)
- 27 February – Julius Stern, German composer and pedagogue (born 1820)
- 14 March – Karl Marx, German philosopher, economist, historian, political theorist, sociologist, journalist and revolutionary socialist (born 1818)
- 15 April – Frederick Francis II, Grand Duke of Mecklenburg-Schwerin (born 1823)
- 29 April – Franz Hermann Schulze-Delitzsch, German economist and politician (born 1808)
- 4 August – August Howaldt, German engineer and ship builder (born 1809)
- 19 November – Arnold Schaefer, German historian (born 1819)
