= 1959 in Germany =

- Decades: 1930s; 1940s; 1950s; 1960s; 1970s
- See also: Other events of 1959; History of Germany • Timeline • Years

The following lists events that happened during 1959 in Germany.

== Incumbents ==
=== West Germany ===
- President – Theodor Heuss (until 13 September), Heinrich Lübke (starting 13 September)
- Chancellor – Konrad Adenauer

=== East Germany ===
- General Secretary of the Central Committee - Walter Ulbricht
- Head of State - Wilhelm Pieck
- Head of Government - Otto Grotewohl

== Events ==
=== March ===
- March 25 - French President Charles De Gaulle opened his first presidential press conference with a statement that France supported German reunification "as the aim and normal destiny of the German people. provided that [they] do not question their present frontiers to the west, east, north or south." "Germany today is not a danger to us," said De Gaulle as he announced a new relationship with his World War II adversary

=== May ===
- May 5 – The United States signed an agreement with West Germany, to share classified information about American nuclear weapons and to train German personnel in the operation of those weapons.
- May 27 - Nikita Khrushchev's ultimatum for action on Berlin expired. The Soviet premier had notified the Western powers on November 27, 1958, that if occupying armies were not withdrawn from West Berlin within six months, access through East Germany to the city would be closed off. The Geneva talks that began on May 11 halted action on the ultimatum. The late U.S. Secretary of State John Foster Dulles, who had said in 1958, "We are not afraid of May 27, 1959", was buried on that date, and the participants in the Geneva talks, including Soviet Foreign Minister Andrei Gromyko, attended the ceremonies at Arlington.

=== June ===
- June 10 – A month after withdrawing a six-month ultimatum for the Western powers to withdraw from Berlin, Soviet Premier Nikita Khrushchev issued a new deadline when talks broke down in Geneva. Khrushchev demanded that the U.S., Britain, and France withdraw their armies from West Berlin by June 10, 1960. The ultimatum was withdrawn on September 27 when Khrushchev met with President Eisenhower at Camp David.

=== October ===
- October 15 – Ukrainian nationalist Stepan Bandera was murdered by a KGB agent Bogdan Stashinsky in Munich. The weapon was a gun that fired hydrogen cyanide gas into Bandera's face. Stashinsky, who had killed newspaperman Lev Rebet in the same manner in 1957, swallowed an antidote, and escaped.

=== November ===
- November 11 – Werner Heyde, a psychiatrist who had guided the euthanizing of more than 100,000 handicapped persons in Nazi Germany, surrendered to police in Frankfurt after 13 years as a fugitive. As director of the Reich Association of Hospitals, Dr. Heyde had carried out "Action T4". Men, women and children who were mentally or physically handicapped were the victims of Heyde's "mercy killing" from 1939 to 1942, usually by lethal injection. Sentenced in absentia to death, Heyde had been practicing in Flensburg as "Dr. Fritz Sawade". On February 13, 1964, five days before his trial was to start, Dr. Heyde hanged himself at the prison in Butzbach.
- November 25 – The first Bilateral Investment Treaty in history was signed between West Germany and Pakistan. BITs govern the terms of private investment between companies in the two nations, including provisions for arbitration of disputes.

=== December ===
- December 13 – Two apartment houses in a suburb of Dortmund were levelled by an explosion at 3:12 a.m.. Of 34 people in the Aplerbeck buildings, 26 were killed.

== Births ==
- January 10 - Bernhard Hoff, German sprinter
- February 2 - Hella von Sinnen, German comedian
- March 9
  - Monika Bader, German alpine skier
  - Giovanni di Lorenzo, German-Italian journalist
- May 8 - Michael Lüders, German political scientist and Islamic scholar
- June 19 - Christian Wulff, German politician, former President of Germany
- July 3 - Rebekka Habermas, German historian (died 2023)
- July 7 - Barbara Krause, German swimmer, Olympic champion (1980)
- September 12 - Sigmar Gabriel, German politician
- October 13 - Robert Jarczyk, German actor
- November 9 - Thomas Quasthoff, German bass-baritone

== Deaths ==
- January 1 — Alfred Gerstenberg, Luftwaffe general (born 1893)
- January 26 - Bruno Gröning, German mystic (born 1906)
- 2 June — Hermann Haupt, German entomologist (born 1873)
- June 9 - Adolf Windaus, German chemist (born 1876)
- July 6 - George Grosz, German artist (born 1893)
- July 25 – Wolfram Hirth, pilot and aircraft designer (born 1900)
- October 17 - Otto Feick, German gymnast (born 1890)
