= 1818 in Germany =

- Decades: 1800s; 1810s; 1820s; 1830s
- See also: Other events of 1818; History of Germany • Timeline • Years

Events from the year 1818 in Germany.

== Incumbents ==
=== Kingdoms ===
- Kingdom of Prussia
  - Monarch – Frederick William III (16 November 1797 – 7 June 1840)
- Kingdom of Bavaria
  - Maximilian I (1 January 1806 – 13 October 1825)
- Kingdom of Saxony
  - Frederick Augustus I (20 December 1806 – 5 May 1827)
- Kingdom of Hanover
  - George III (25 October 1760 –29 January 1820)
- Kingdom of Württemberg
  - William (30 October 1816 – 25 June 1864)

=== Grand Duchies ===
- Grand Duke of Baden
  - Charles 10 June 1811 – 8 December 1818
  - Louis I (8 December 1818 – 30 March 1830)
- Grand Duke of Hesse
  - Louis I (14 August 1806 – 6 April 1830)
- Grand Duke of Mecklenburg-Schwerin
  - Frederick Francis I– (24 April 1785 – 1 February 1837)
- Grand Duke of Mecklenburg-Strelitz
  - George (6 November 1816 – 6 September 1860)
- Grand Duke of Oldenburg
  - Wilhelm (6 July 1785 –2 July 1823 ) Due to mental illness, Wilhelm was duke in name only, with his cousin Peter, Prince-Bishop of Lübeck, acting as regent throughout his entire reign.
  - Peter I (2 July 1823 - 21 May 1829)
- Grand Duke of Saxe-Weimar-Eisenach
  - Charles Frederick (14 June 1828 - 8 July 1853)

=== Principalities ===
- Schaumburg-Lippe
  - George William (13 February 1787 - 1860)
- Schwarzburg-Rudolstadt
  - Friedrich Günther (28 April 1807 - 28 June 1867)
- Schwarzburg-Sondershausen
  - Günther Friedrich Karl I (14 October 1794 - 19 August 1835)
- Principality of Lippe
  - Leopold II (5 November 1802 - 1 January 1851)
- Principality of Reuss-Greiz
  - Heinrich XIX (29 January 1817 - 31 October 1836)
- Waldeck and Pyrmont
  - George II (9 September 1813 - 15 May 1845)

=== Duchies ===
- Duke of Anhalt-Dessau
  - Leopold IV (9 August 1817 - 22 May 1871)
- Duke of Brunswick
  - Charles II (16 June 1815 – 9 September 1830)
- Duke of Saxe-Altenburg
  - Duke of Saxe-Hildburghausen (1780–1826) - Frederick
- Duke of Saxe-Coburg and Gotha
  - Ernest I (9 December 1806 – 12 November 1826)
- Duke of Saxe-Meiningen
  - Bernhard II (24 December 1803–20 September 1866)
- Duke of Schleswig-Holstein-Sonderburg-Beck
  - Frederick William (25 March 1816 – 6 July 1825)

== Events ==
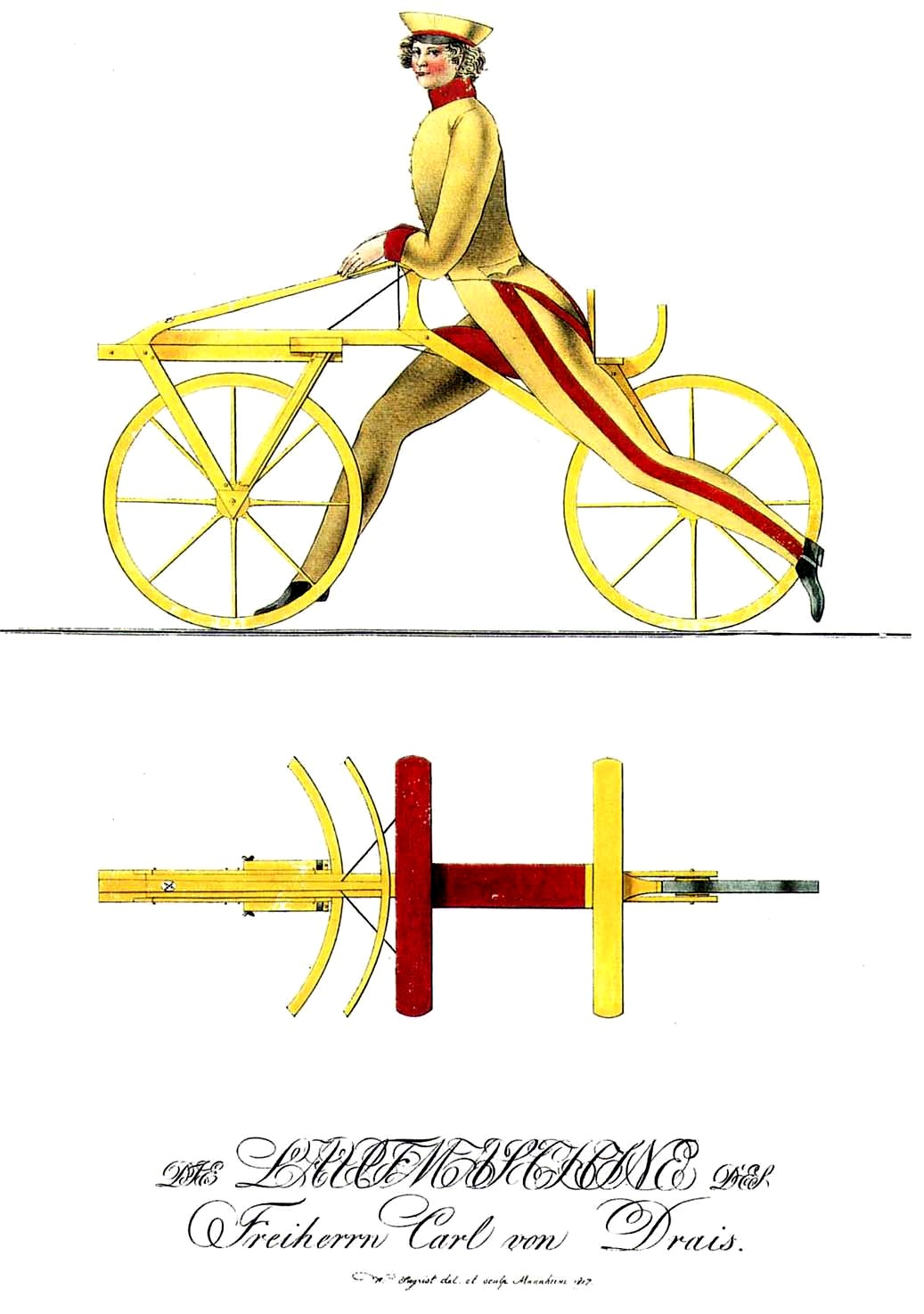
Original Laufmaschine of 1817 made to measure.

- 12 January - The Dandy horse (Laufmaschine bicycle) was invented by Karl Drais in Mannheim.
- The University of Hohenheim located in the south of Stuttgart, Germany is founded.
- The Städel, officially the Städelsches Kunstinstitut und Städtische Galerie, an art museum in Frankfurt, is founded.
- Akademisches Kunstmuseum, an art museum in Bonn, is founded.

== Births ==
- 8 April – August Wilhelm von Hofmann, German chemist (d. 1892)
- 5 May – Karl Marx, German political philosopher, co-author of The Communist Manifesto (d. 1883)

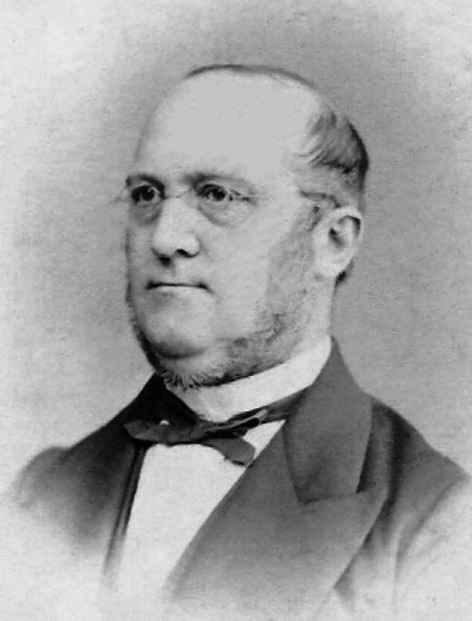
Adolph Wilhelm Hermann Kolbe

- 27 September – Adolph Wilhelm Hermann Kolbe, German chemist (d. 1884)
- 7 November — Emil du Bois-Reymond, German physiologist (d. 1896)
- 18 December – Max Joseph von Pettenkofer, German chemist and hygienist (d. 1901)
- Francis Dutton, Germany-born Premier of South Australia (d. 1892)

== Deaths ==
- 11 January – Johann David Wyss, Swiss children's author writing in German (born 1743) 15 February – Friedrich Ludwig, Fürst zu Hohenlohe-Ingelfingen, Prussian general (b. 1746)
- 22 October – Joachim Heinrich Campe, German linguist and publisher (born 1746)
- 5 November – Heinrich Füger, German portrait and historical painter (born 1751)

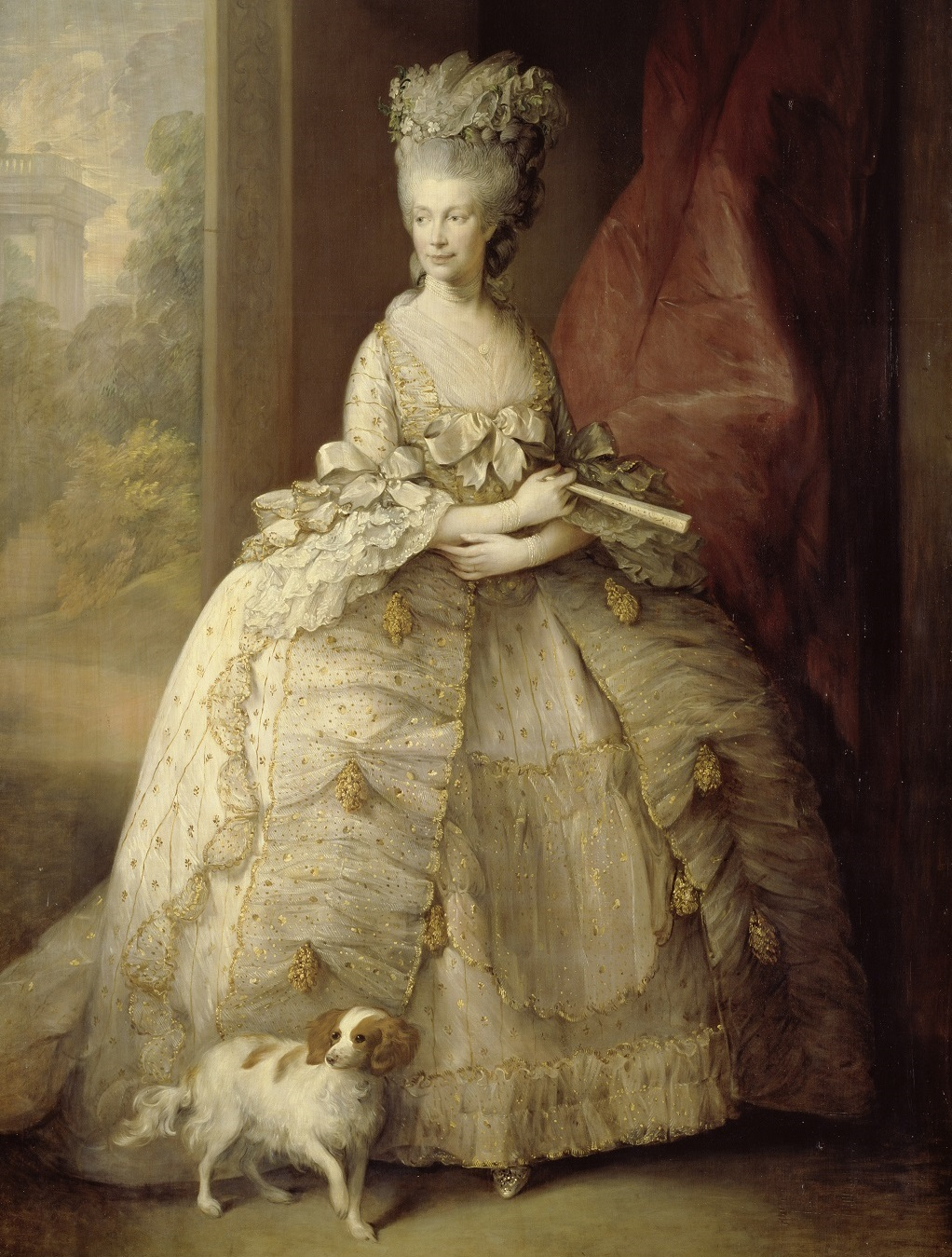
Charlotte of Mecklenburg-Strelitz

- 17 November – Charlotte of Mecklenburg-Strelitz, queen of George III of the United Kingdom (b. 1744)
