= 1814 in Germany =

- Decades: 1800s; 1810s; 1820s; 1830s
- See also: Other events of 1814; History of Germany • Timeline • Years

Events from the year 1814 in Germany.

== Incumbents ==
=== Kingdoms ===
- Kingdom of Prussia
  - Monarch – Frederick William III (16 November 1797 – 7 June 1840)
- Kingdom of Bavaria
  - Maximilian I (1 January 1806 – 13 October 1825)
- Kingdom of Saxony
  - Frederick Augustus I (20 December 1806 – 5 May 1827)
- Kingdom of Hanover
  - George III (25 October 1760 –29 January 1820)
- Kingdom of Württemberg
  - Frederick I (22 December 1797 – 30 October 1816)

=== Grand Duchies ===
- Grand Duke of Baden
  - Charles 10 June 1811 – 8 December 1818
- Grand Duke of Hesse
  - Louis I (14 August 1806 – 6 April 1830)
- Grand Duke of Mecklenburg-Schwerin
  - Frederick Francis I– (24 April 1785 – 1 February 1837)
- Grand Duke of Mecklenburg-Strelitz
  - Charles II (2 June 1794 – 6 November 1816)
- Grand Duke of Oldenburg
  - Wilhelm (6 July 1785 –2 July 1823 ) Due to mental illness, Wilhelm was duke in name only, with his cousin Peter, Prince-Bishop of Lübeck, acting as regent throughout his entire reign.
  - Peter I (2 July 1823 - 21 May 1829)
- Grand Duke of Saxe-Weimar-Eisenach
  - Karl August (1809–1815)

=== Principalities ===
- Schaumburg-Lippe
  - George William (13 February 1787 - 1860)
- Schwarzburg-Rudolstadt
  - Friedrich Günther (28 April 1807 - 28 June 1867)
- Schwarzburg-Sondershausen
  - Günther Friedrich Karl I (14 October 1794 - 19 August 1835)
- Principality of Lippe
  - Leopold II (5 November 1802 - 1 January 1851)
- Principality of Reuss-Greiz
  - Heinrich XIII (28 June 1800-29 January 1817)
- Waldeck and Pyrmont
  - George II (9 September 1813 - 15 May 1845)

=== Duchies ===
- Duke of Anhalt-Dessau
  - Leopold III (16 December 1751 – 9 August 1817)
- Duke of Brunswick
  - Frederick William (16 October 1806 – 16 June 1815)
- Duke of Saxe-Altenburg
  - Duke of Saxe-Hildburghausen (1780–1826) - Frederick
- Duke of Saxe-Coburg and Gotha
  - Ernest I (9 December 1806 – 12 November 1826)
- Duke of Saxe-Meiningen
  - Bernhard II (24 December 1803–20 September 1866)
- Duke of Schleswig-Holstein-Sonderburg-Beck
  - Frederick Charles Louis (24 February 1775 – 25 March 1816)

== Events ==
- 1 January – War of the Sixth Coalition – The Royal Prussian Army led by Gebhard Leberecht von Blücher crosses the Rhine.
- 3 January- War of the Sixth Coalition – Siege of Metz (1814): Allied armies lay siege to the French city and fortress of Metz.
- 11 January – War of the Sixth Coalition – Battle of Hoogstraten: Prussian forces under Friedrich Wilhelm Freiherr von Bülow defeat the French.
- 24 January – War of the Sixth Coalition – First Battle of Bar-sur-Aube: Two Austrian and Württemberger corps wage an inconclusive battle against the French Imperial Guard.
- 29 January – War of the Sixth Coalition – Battle of Brienne: A French army led by Napoleon is victorious against von Blücher.
- 1 February -War of the Sixth Coalition – Battle of La Rothière: Blücher's Allied army defeats the French under Napoleon.
- 11 February-War of the Sixth Coalition – Battle of Montmirail: A French army led by Napoleon is victorious against Fabian Gottlieb von der Osten-Sacken and Ludwig Yorck von Wartenburg in the Six Days' Campaign.
- 12 February- War of the Sixth Coalition – Battle of Château-Thierry (1814): A French army led by Napoleon is victorious against Ludwig Yorck von Wartenburg and Fabian Gottlieb von der Osten-Sacken in the Six Days' Campaign.
- 14 February – War of the Sixth Coalition – Battle of Vauchamps: A French army led by Napoleon is victorious against von Blücher, the last major action of the Six Days' Campaign.
- 28 February – War of the Sixth Coalition – Battle of Gué-à-Tresmes: Two French corps led by Auguste Marmont and Édouard Mortier defeat Prusso-Russian forces.
- 3 March- War of the Sixth Coalition – Battle of Laubressel: Schwarzenberg defeats the French under MacDonald.
- 7 March – War of the Sixth Coalition – Battle of Craonne: A French army led by Napoleon is victorious against von Blücher.
- 10 March – War of the Sixth Coalition – Battle of Laon: von Blücher defeats Napoleon.
- 13 March – War of the Sixth Coalition – Battle of Reims (1814): Napoleon defeats a combined Russo-Prussian corps.
- 20 March- War of the Sixth Coalition – Battle of Limonest: Austrian and Hessian forces defeat the French Army of the Rhône.
- 25 March- War of the Sixth Coalition – Battle of Fère-Champenoise: Allied army led by Schwarzenberg defeats the French under Marmont and Mortier.
- 31 March- War of the Sixth Coalition – Battle of Courtrai (1814): French forces defeat Saxons and Prussians.
- 10 April- War of the Sixth Coalition – Siege of Metz is lifted by the Allies.
- 4 May- War of the Sixth Coalition – Siege of Mainz ends as the French leave the fortress.
- 27 May – War of the Sixth Coalition – Siege of Hamburg ends in a French capitulation.
- 6 June – Beginning of the Allied sovereigns' visit to England: Tsar Alexander I of Russia and King Frederick William III of Prussia sail from Boulogne-Sur-Mer to Dover on board the Royal Navy ship HMS Impregnable as guests of George, Prince of Wales, the regent during the incapacity of King George III.
- 30 July – The Great fire of Tirschenreuth in Bavaria destroys the town and 907 buildings.
- 1 November – The Congress of Vienna formally opens in Austria to settle the many issues arising from the French Revolutionary Wars, the Napoleonic Wars, and the dissolution of the Holy Roman Empire, with the European powers agreeing upon the redrawing of national borders following the victory over France; it will last until 9 June 1815.

== Births ==
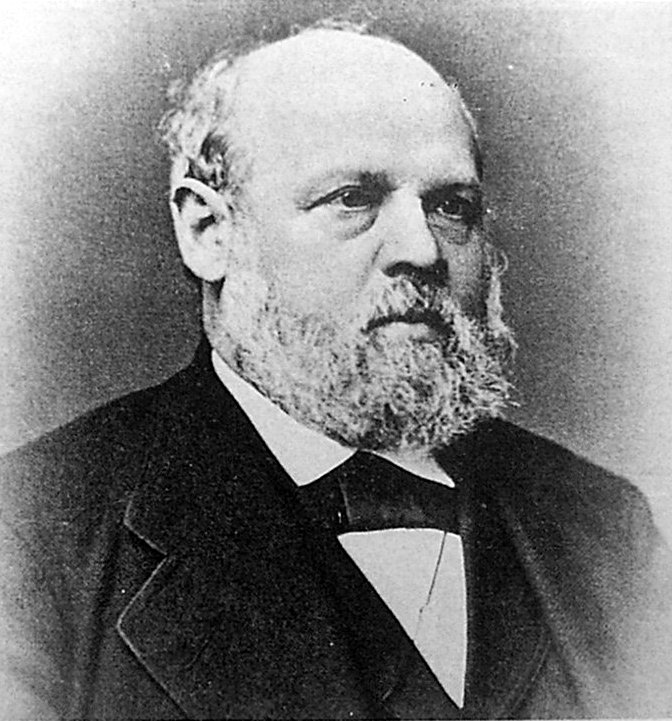
Heinrich Geissler

- 12 May – Adolf von Henselt, German composer (d. 1889)
- 26 May- Heinrich Geißler, German physicist (d. 1879)
- 10 August – Henri Nestlé, German-born Swiss chocolate magnate (d. 1890)
- 2 September – Ernst Curtius, German archaeologist, historian (d. 1896)
- 2 November= Julius von Mayer, German physician, physicist, one of the founders of thermodynamics (d. 1878)
- 26 November – Luise Aston, German author, feminist (d. 1871)

== Deaths ==
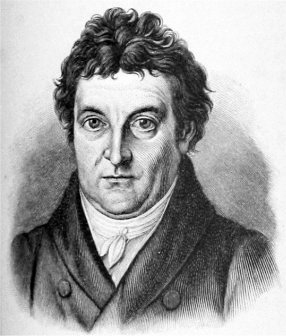
Johann Gottlieb Fichte

- 27 January
  - Johann Gottlieb Fichte, German philosopher (b. 1762)
  - Georg Joseph Vogler, German composer (b. 1749)
- 27 June – Johann Friedrich Reichardt, German composer (b. 1752)
- 22 September – August Wilhelm Iffland, German actor (b. 1759)
