= Heyer =

Heyer is a surname. Notable people with the surname include:

- Carl Justus Heyer (1797–1856), German professor of forestry
- Conrad Heyer (1749–1856), one of the earliest-born men to have been photographed
- Friedrich Casimir Gustav Heyer (1826–1883), German professor of forestry
- Georgette Heyer (1902–1974), English novelist
- Hans Heyer (born 1943), German racing driver
- John Heyer (1916–2001), Australian documentary filmmaker
- John Christian Frederick Heyer (1793–1873), American missionary
- John Henry Heyer (1831–1905), American politician
- Hans-Joachim Heyer (1920–1942), German Luftwaffe ace
- Laurie Heyer, American mathematician
- Moritz Heyer (born 1995), German footballer
- Sascha Heyer (born 1972), Swiss beach volleyball player
- Shane Heyer (born 1964), Canadian ice hockey linesman
- Stephon Heyer (born 1984), American footballer
- Volker Heyer (born 1970), German judoka
