= Friedrich Ludwig Walther =

Friedrich Ludwig Walther (3 July 1759 – 30 March 1824) was a German cameralist and pioneer of scientific forestry. He worked at the botanical garden at the University of Giessen and was involved in setting up forestry studies by training his student who included Gustav Friedrich Casimir Heyer (1826–83) and Johann Christian Hundeshagen (1783–1834). He also wrote on domestic animals including the dog and the horse.

Walther was born in Schwaningen near Ansbach where his father was Johann Erdmann (d. 1763) was a priest married to Katharina Renate Georgi (d. 1762) daughter of a pastor from Samenheim. After losing both parents at a young age he was cared for by his maternal grandmother from 1763 and by an uncle from 1773. He went to grammar school in Ansbach before studying theology at the University of Erlangen from 1777. He was influenced by Georg Friedrich Seiler (1733–1807), Johann Georg Rosenmüller (1736–1815), and Johann Wilhelm Rau (1745–1807). He worked as a private tutor and worked on the estate of Colonel von Pöllnitz at Haimersgrün, examining plants, agriculture and forestry. In 1785 he moved to Creglingen where he began to study the natural sciences. He joined the University of Giessen as a lecturer in economic natural history, habilitating in 1788. He became a full professor in 1790 and became director of the botanical garden in 1800. He wrote about forest trees and the history of forests. His students Gustav Friedrich Casimir Heyer (1826–83) and Johann Christian Hundeshagen (1783–1834) would go on to establish the first German forestry school. He suffered from a stroke in 1822 and died two years later. A memorial urn was installed in Giessen.

The standard author abbreviation Walther is used to indicate this person as the author when citing a botanical name.
