= Rosenmüller =

Rosenmüller is a surname of German origin. People with that name include:

- Johann Rosenmüller (1619-1684), German Baroque composer
- Johann Georg Rosenmüller (1736–1815), German Protestant theologian
- Ernst Friedrich Karl Rosenmüller (1768-1835), his elder son, German Orientalist and Protestant theologian
- Johann Christian Rosenmüller (1771-1820), his younger son, German anatomist
