= 1811 in Germany =

- Decades: 1800s; 1810s; 1820s; 1830s
- See also: Other events of 1811; History of Germany • Timeline • Years

Events from the year 1811 in Germany.

== Incumbents ==
=== Kingdoms ===
- Kingdom of Prussia
  - Monarch – Frederick William III (16 November 1797 – 7 June 1840)
- Kingdom of Bavaria
  - Maximilian I (1 January 1806 – 13 October 1825)
- Kingdom of Saxony
  - Frederick Augustus I (20 December 1806 – 5 May 1827)
- Kingdom of Württemberg
  - Frederick I (22 December 1797 – 30 October 1816)

=== Grand Duchies ===
- Grand Duke of Baden
  - Charles Frederick (25 July 1806 – 10 June 1811)
  - Charles 10 June 1811 – 8 December 1818
- Grand Duke of Hesse
  - Louis I (14 August 1806 – 6 April 1830)
- Grand Duke of Mecklenburg-Schwerin
  - Frederick Francis I– (24 April 1785 – 1 February 1837)
- Grand Duke of Mecklenburg-Strelitz
  - Charles II (2 June 1794 – 6 November 1816)
- Grand Duke of Oldenburg
  - Wilhelm (6 July 1785 –2 July 1823 ) Due to mental illness, Wilhelm was duke in name only, with his cousin Peter, Prince-Bishop of Lübeck, acting as regent throughout his entire reign.
  - Peter I (2 July 1823 - 21 May 1829)
- Grand Duke of Saxe-Weimar-Eisenach
  - Karl August (1809–1815)

=== Principalities ===
- Schaumburg-Lippe
  - George William (13 February 1787 - 1860)
- Schwarzburg-Rudolstadt
  - Friedrich Günther (28 April 1807 - 28 June 1867)
- Schwarzburg-Sondershausen
  - Günther Friedrich Karl I (14 October 1794 - 19 August 1835)
- Principality of Lippe
  - Leopold II (5 November 1802 - 1 January 1851)
- Principality of Reuss-Greiz
  - Heinrich XIII (28 June 1800-29 January 1817)
- Waldeck and Pyrmont
  - Friedrich Karl August (29 August 1763 – 24 September 1812)

=== Duchies ===
- Duke of Anhalt-Dessau
  - Leopold III (16 December 1751 – 9 August 1817)
- Duke of Brunswick
  - Frederick William (16 October 1806 – 16 June 1815)
- Duke of Saxe-Altenburg
  - Duke of Saxe-Hildburghausen (1780–1826) - Frederick
- Duke of Saxe-Coburg and Gotha
  - Ernest I (9 December 1806 – 12 November 1826)
- Duke of Saxe-Meiningen
  - Bernhard II (24 December 1803–20 September 1866)
- Duke of Schleswig-Holstein-Sonderburg-Beck
  - Frederick Charles Louis (24 February 1775 – 25 March 1816)

== Events ==
- 21 November – German poet Heinrich von Kleist shoots his terminally ill lover Henriette Vogel and then himself, on the shore of the Kleiner Wannsee near Potsdam.
- Johann Nepomuk Hummel – 12 German Dances and Coda for Redout-Deutsche
- Forstbotanischer Garten Tharandt established
- Royal Saxon Academy of Forestry established

== Births ==
- 27 January – Ernst Dieffenbach, German scientist (d. 1855)
- 30 or 31 March – Robert Bunsen, German chemist, inventor (d. 1899)
- 30 September – Augusta of Saxe-Weimar-Eisenach, German empress (d. 1890)
- 25 October – C. F. W. Walther, German-American theologian (d. 1887)
- 21 November – Ludwig Preiss, German-born British botanical collector (d. 1883)
- 28 November – King Maximilian II of Bavaria (d. 1864)
- 3 December – Eduard Bendemann, German painter (d. 1889)
- 5 December – Justus Carl Hasskarl, German explorer, botanist (d. 1894)

== Deaths ==
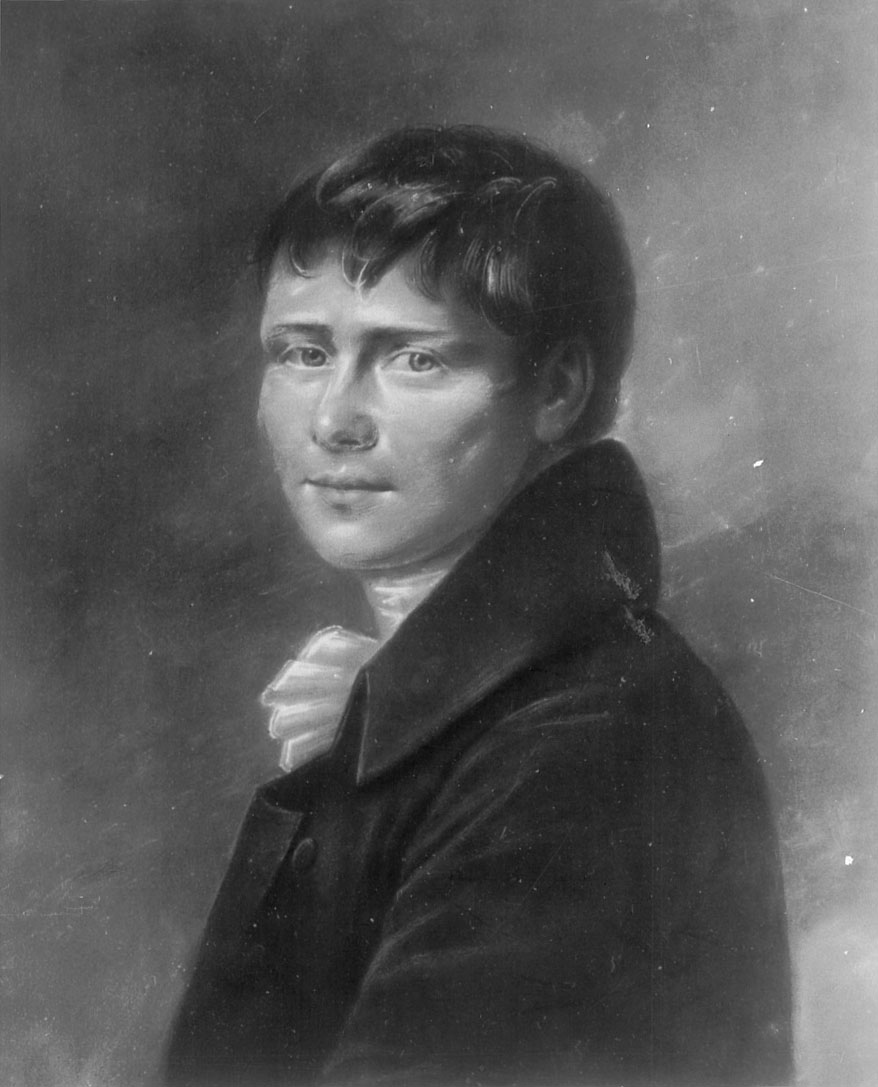
Heinrich von Kleist

- 11 January – Christoph Friedrich Nicolai writer and bookseller (b. 1733)
- 3 February – Johann Beckmann, scientist (b. 1739)
- 19 July – Christian Gotthilf Tag, composer (b. 1735)
- September – Ulrich Jasper Seetzen, German explorer (b. 1767)
- 8 September – Peter Simon Pallas, German zoologist (b. 1741)
- 21 November – Heinrich von Kleist, German writer (suicide) (b. 1777)
