= Carl Justus Heyer =

German forester and professor (1797–1856)

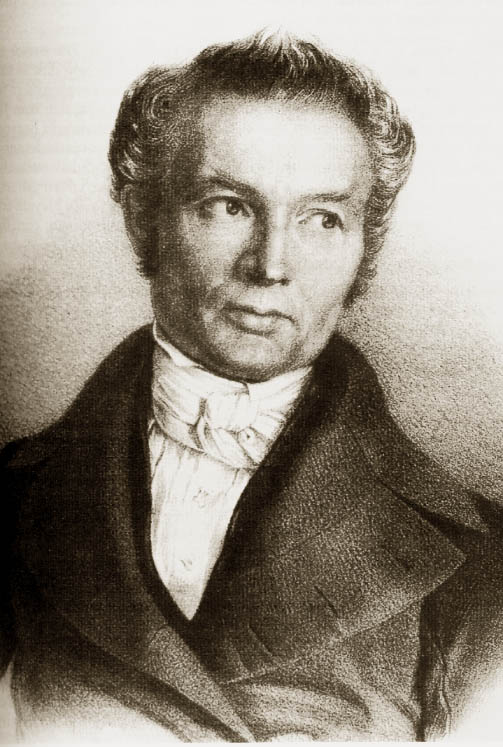

Carl Justus Heyer (9 April 1797 – 24 August 1856) was a German forester and professor of forestry at the University of Giessen. His son Gustav Heyer also became a forester.

Heyer was born in Bessungen to forester Jacob Wilhelm (1759–1815) and Louise née Walloth (1770–1805). His father wanted him to pursue theology but like his father he became interested in the forests and after high school he joined his father's master school to study hunting and forestry administration. In 1814 he went to the University of Giessen and studied at the forest academy in Tharandt. His father died in 1815 and he was fortunate in receiving a scholarship from the Grand Duke Ludwig I. He studied forest cameralism from professor Friedrich Ludwig Walther (1759–1824) and in 1817 he attended classes of Heinrich Cotta. He then began to teach at the forestry college in Darmstadt. In 1818 he took up forest administration in Babenhausen and the next year Zellhausen district. After the death of Walther in 1824, a new forestry school was opened in Giessen with Johann Christian Hundeshagen as director and Heyer as a teacher of forestry. In 1829 he was also made forestry inspector for Giessen and in 1831 he left due to differences with Hundeshagen. He then worked in the Odenwald under Count of Erbach-Fürstenau. In 1835 he moved back to Giessen where he gave lectures. He left forestry service in 1843 due to lung disease and began to work on writing and teaching alone.

Heyer married Johannette Jöckel and they had four sons and four daughters. One of his sons, Gustav Heyer, also became a professor of forestry.
