= Rosenmöller =

Rosenmöller is a surname. Notable people with the surname include:

- Bernhard Rosenmöller (1883–1974), German teacher and philosopher
- Paul Rosenmöller (born 1956), Dutch television presenter, politician, and trade unionist

== See also ==
- Rosenmüller
