= Heinrich Cotta =

German forester (1763–1844)

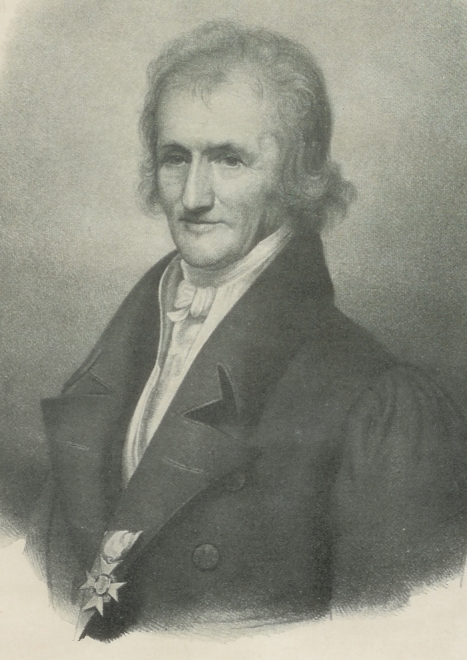
Heinrich Cotta (1763–1844)

Johann Heinrich Cotta (30 October 1763 – 25 October 1844) was a German silviculturist who was a native of Kleine Zillbach, near Wasungen, Thuringia. He was founder of the Royal Saxon Academy of Forestry, in Tharandt, and is known as a pioneer of scientific forestry along with Georg Ludwig Hartig, Friedrich Wilhelm Leopold Pfeil, Johann Christian Hundeshagen, and Carl Justus Heyer. He was the father of the geologist Bernhard von Cotta (1808–1879).

== Early life ==
Cotta was born in Hanau to forester Nicholas Heinrich (1730-1796) and Ursula Elisabeth née Erbe. Cotta reportedly said of himself:

"I am a child of the forest; no roof covers the spot where I was born. Old oaks and beeches shade its solitude and grass grows upon it. The first song I heard was of the birds of the forest, my first surroundings were trees. Thus my birth determined my calling!"

Initially learning forestry from his father, in 1784–85 Cotta enrolled at the University of Jena, where he studied mathematics, natural sciences and cameralism (public administration). In 1785, he returned to Zillbach to teach forestry at one of the earliest master schools of forestry, with his father. The school was established with support from Duke Carl August. Cotta became a forester in 1789. In 1795 he married Christiane née Ortmann at Kaltennordheim. In 1801 he became a member of the forestry college in Eisenach, while continuing his work at Zillbach. During this time his reputation grew, and in 1810 Cotta was appointed director of Forstvermessung und Taxation (Forest Mensuration and Taxation) by Frederick Augustus I of Saxony.

== Founder of the Royal Saxon Academy of Forestry ==
In 1811, he established a forestry school at Tharandt, near Dresden, together with its arboretum, the Forstbotanischer Garten Tharandt, still in existence. The school later would be known as the Royal Saxon Academy of Forestry; and lives on today as site of the Department of Forestry of Dresden University of Technology. The new forestry school attracted students throughout Europe, and in 1813 was visited by Johann Wolfgang von Goethe. Alexander von Humboldt also visited him at Tharandt. In 1841, Cotta was given an award by Tsar Nicholas I in recognition of his efforts at Tharandt.

== Pioneer of modern forestry ==
Cotta was a pioneer of modern forestry, and was a catalyst concerning the transition from "timber production" to forestry as a scientific discipline. Others who helped establish forestry included Georg Ludwig Hartig, Friedrich Wilhelm Leopold Pfeil, Johann Christian Hundeshagen, and Carl Justus Heyer. Cotta was interested in all aspects of forestry, including studies involving long-term seeding, establishment of forested areas, and tree-cutting based on mathematic practices. Cotta's methodology was based on a geometric survey of the forest, where calculations of the wood mass of individual trees as well as the yield of the entire forested region were made. By way of these calculations an estimate for the monetary worth of a forest could be assessed. In 1804 Cotta was the first to suggest the concept of a "volume table", which was a chart that was introduced decades later to aid in the estimation of standing timber volume. In 1816, Cotta wrote:

"Three principal causes exist why forestry is still so backward: first, the long time which wood needs for its development; second, the great variety of sites on which it grows; thirdly, the fact that the forester who practices much writes but little, and he who writes much practices but little."

Cotta established a three step approach to forestry, the first was to survey the extent, the second was to estimate the mass of wood along with growth rates, and the third was to link it to a monetary value system with forests as capital, and yield being interest over time along with calculations of economic value.

== Palaeontogical interests ==
Cotta also had a keen interest in geology and fossils, and during his career amassed an impressive collection of zoological and botanical fossils. Today, pieces of this collection are kept at Humboldt University of Berlin (Institute for Paleontology), in the museum for natural history in Chemnitz, at the Academy of Mining in Freiberg, in the State Natural History Collections in Dresden and in the Natural History Museum in London.

== Published works ==
- Systematische Anleitung zur Taxation der Waldungen (Systematic Instructions for Taxation of Forests), Berlin 1804
- Naturbeobachtungen über die Bewegung und Funktion des Saftes in den Gewächsen, mit vorzüglicher Hinsicht auf Holzpflanzen (Natural Observations on the Movement and Function of Sap in Crops, with Particular Respect to Woodyplants.), Weimar 1806
- Grundriß zu einem System der Forstwissenschaft (Outline on a System of Forest Science), 1813
- Tafeln zur Bestimmung des Inhalts und Wertes unverarbeiteter Hölzer (Tables for Determining the Content and Values of Unprocessed Timber), Dresden (1816 to 1897, seventeen editions)
- Anweisung zum Waldbau (Directions for Silviculture), Dresden 1817
- Die Verbindung des Feldbaues mit dem Waldbau oder die Baumfeldwirtschaft(The Connection of Agriculture with Silviculture or Economic Tree Cultivation), Dresden 1819-1822
- Anweisung zur Forsteinrichtung und Abschätzung (Directions for Forest Management Planning and Assessment), Dresden 1820
- Grundriß der Forstwissenschaft (Outline of Forest Science), Dresden und Leipzig 1832
- Der Kammerbühl nach wiederholten Untersuchungen aufs neue beschrieben(The Kammerbühl Newly Described After Repeated Investigations), Dresden 1833
