= Johann Christian Hundeshagen =

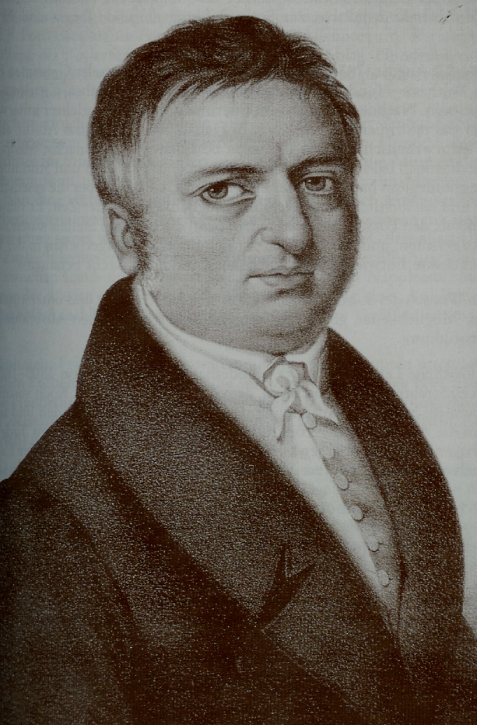

Johann Christian Hundeshagen (August 10, 1783 – February 10, 1834) was a German forester who is considered as a pioneer of scientific forestry. Along with Georg Ludwig Hartig and Heinrich Cotta, he has been considered a founding figure in German forestry. He introduced a speculative and deductive approach that included the application of statistics and measurement. He produced a three-part encyclopedia of forestry science.

Hundeshagen was born in Hanau to Hesse-Cassel Privy Councillor Johann Balthasar. He studied locally before going to forestry schools in Waldau and Dillenberg. He apprenticed to forester Koch in Sterbfritz (near Schlüchtern). He studied cameral sciences and natural sciences at the University of Heidelberg from 1804 to 1806 and went into forestry service. He worked in Hesse and in 1821 he became a professor of forestry at the University of Tübingen but gave up the position and moved to Fulda as director of the forestry school. He moved to Giessen as a professor in 1824 and became the director of the forestry school the next year. He however left the school in 1831 and he became ill in 1833 and died from liver cirrhosis the next year.

Hundeshagen developed a land rent theory for forestry, treating forests as capital and applying interest rates to them.
