= Catharina Helena Dörrien =

German botanist, botanical artist and governess (1717–1795)

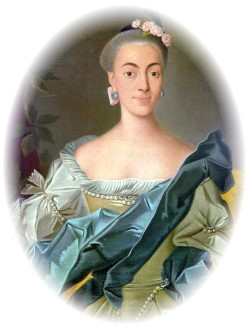
- Born: 1 March 1717; Hildesheim
- Died: 8 June 1795 (aged 78); Dillenburg
- Scientific career
- Fields: Botany

Catharina Helena Dörrien (1 March 1717, in Hildesheim – 8 June 1795, in Dillenburg) was a German botanist and teacher, recognized as "the most celebrated German-speaking female naturalist of the period". She was a talented artist who painted over 1,400 watercolor botanical illustrations, and published a catalogue of plants of the Principality of Orange-Nassau in 1777. She was also the first woman to name a fungal taxon.

== Early life ==
Dörrien was the daughter of Pastor Johann Jonas Dörrien and Lucia Catharina (née Schrader), and was the second of their four children. The pastor educated his children at home, including in botany. Dörrien took over the running of the family home after her mother died in 1733, but her father died four years later.

== Career ==
Dörrien left Hildesheim and started working as a governess in Dillenburg for her childhood friend Sophie Anna Blandina (née von Alers) in 1746, when she was 30. Dörrien initially painted for pleasure, but was encouraged by Sophie's husband, Anton Ulrich von Erath, to create an illustrated flora of the principality of Orange-Nassau. Dörrien produced the catalogue in 1777, being one of the first Germans to use the Linnean system of classification. In the catalogue she introduced two varieties, becoming the first woman to name a fungal taxon.

== Honours ==
Dörrien was an honorary member of numerous societies: honorary member of the Societatis Botanicae Florentinae (Botanical Society of Florence, from 1766), the Gesellschaft Naturforschender Freunde zu Berlin (Berlin Society of Friends of Nature, from 1776), the first female member of the Berlinischen Gesellschaft (Berlin Society, from 1776) and the Botanischen Gesellschaft zu Regensburg (Regensburg Botanical Society, from 1790).

Doerriena, a genus of chickweeds is named after Dörrien.

== Publications ==
Dörrien CH (1770a). Von der Fragaria sterilis. Hannoverisches Magazin 8(35): 557–560.
Dörrien CH (1770b). Von den Wurzeln der Cuscuta. Hannoverisches Magazin8(56): 891–896.
Dörrien CH (1773). Erfahrung von verschiedenem Ungeziefer, welches den Salat verfolget, und den Mitteln dagegen. Dillenburgische Intelligenz-Nachrichten 5 June: 153–154.
Dörrien CH (1777) [as ‘1779’]. Verzeichniß und Beschreibung der sämtlichen in den Fürstlich Oranien-Naussauischen Landen wildwachsenden Gewächse. Bey Christian Gottfried Donatius, Lübeck, Germany. [TL-2 31.113, 2 editions]
Dörrien CH (1785). Nachrichten von Katharina Helena Dörrien, von ihr selbst erzählt, in einem Briefe an Herrn Professor Seybold. Magazin für Frauenzimmer 1785(4): 125–135.
