= Ernst Friedrich Karl Rosenmüller =

Ernst Friedrich Karl Rosenmüller (10 December 1768 in Heßberg (Hildburghausen) – 17 September 1835 in Leipzig) was a German Orientalist and Protestant theologian.

== Biography ==
He was the eldest son of the rationalist theologian Johann Georg Rosenmüller. His brother Johann Christian Rosenmüller (1771 – 1820) was a prominent German anatomist. He became identified with the University of Leipzig, first as a student, in 1792 as a tutor, extraordinary professor of Arabic in 1796, and ordinary professor of Oriental languages from 1813 to the time of his death, 1835. He promoted the study of the Arabic language, brought within the reach of theologians the rapidly increasing knowledge of his day with reference to the conditions of the East, and endeavored to raise the exposition of the language and statements of the Old Testament to the level of the science of his day. His Bible commentaries and Arab lexical studies were significant scholarly achievements.

== Publications ==
- Scholia in Vetus Testamentum (16 pts., 1788–1817; excerpted in 5 pts., 1828–35)
- Handbuch für die Litteratur der biblischen Kritik und Exegese (4 pts., 1797–1800)
- Institutiones ad fundamenta linguae arabicae (1818)
- Das alte und neue Morgenland, oder Erläuterungen der heiligen Schrift aus der natürlichen Beschaffenheit, den Sagen, Sitten und Gebräuchen des Morgenlands (6 vols., 1818–20)
- Handbuch der biblischen Alterthumskunde (4 vols., 1823–31), of which portions concerning the flora, fauna and mineralogy of the Holy Land were translated into English:
  - Biblical Geography of Asia Minor, Phoenicia, and Arabia (1836)
  - Biblical Geography of Central Asia (2 vols., 1836–37)
  - Mineralogy and Botany of the Bible (1840)
- Analecta Arabica (1824)

Further, he published editions of Bochart's Hierozoicon (1796) with notes by himself, and of Lowth's Prælectiones (Leipsic, 1815), and brought out a pocket edition of the Hebrew Bible (Halle, 1822), besides writing a preface to Hahn's edition of 1830.
