= Bruno Gröning =

German mystic (1906–1959)

- Born: Bruno Bernhard Grönkowski; 30 May 1906; Danzig, German Empire (now Gdańsk, Poland)
- Died: 26 January 1959 (aged 52); Paris, France

Bruno Gröning (born Bruno Bernhard Grönkowski; 30 May 1906 – 26 January 1959) was a German mystic who rose to fame in the late 1940s for performing faith healings.

== Biography ==
Gröning was born into a Catholic family in Danzig in 1906. He was the fourth of seven and grew up living in an urban housing block in the suburb of Oliva. He never completed his education. He trained as a carpenter for a time, but also worked variously as a waiter, an electrician, a furniture marker, a paint seller and as a repairman of bicycles, sewing machines and watches. In 1928, he married a woman named Gertrud with whom he would have two sons, both of whom later died, with the elder boy dying in 1939 due to a heart defect and the younger boy dying in 1949 due to pleurisy. The marriage between Bruno and Gertrud was described as unhappy and the two would ultimately divorce.

After their seizure of power in 1933, the Nazi Party established a significant presence in Danzig. Gröning, his father, and his brother joined the Nazi Party sometime before 1936. The family also changed its surname from Grönkowski, Grenkowski, or Grzenkowski – records are unclear – to the more German sounding Gröning in 1936. In March 1943, he was conscripted into the Wehrmacht as a Panzerjäger and underwent training in Kolberg, but was later captured by the Soviets in Köslin and spent a period from March to late October 1945 in a prisoner of war camp in Frankfurt an der Oder.

Groening came to public attention in the city of Hertford in the state of North Rhine-Westphalia. After reports of Groening's alleged healing abilities were published in the press, "countless" people flocked to Hertford to seek Groening's help. In May 1949, Groening received a ban on the state level from acting as a healer, and he relocated to the city of Rosenheim in Bavaria. Here the authorities were more supportive, with the state's minister president Hans Ehard expressing the opinion that legalities shouldn't impede the activities of such an "extraordinary phenomenon".

With intense media coverage in magazines, radio and Wochenschau newsreels, soon tens of thousands of people were filling the horse paddocks near the inn where Gröning was lodging at the outskirts of Rosenheim, hoping that his "healing rays" (Heilstrahlen) would cure them of war injuries, blindness, and other handicaps and ailments. Gröning spoke to them from a balcony and had small tin foil balls (allegedly charged with his healing powers) distribute to those that he was not able to touch in person. While he did not accept money, he is assumed to have received a substantial amount of donations. Gröning was later charged with negligent homicide of a 17-year-old girl with lung disease; he later received several suspended prison sentences and fines.

=== Personal life and death ===
Gröning was a chain-smoker and a heavy coffee drinker. While in Herford, it was reported that "he liked to take a drink; he caroused." During this time, his manager Otto Mecklenburg described Groening as a womanizer. There was an allegation of rape, which was dropped. Some members of his inner circle found it necessary to control his access to women to prevent scandal. Other supporters denied accusations of sexual misconduct. In the 1940s, he wore his hair unusually long and kept only one set of clothing, which he washed every evening.

Gröning died in Paris at the age of 52 of stomach cancer; his ashes were buried in Dillenburg next to his younger son.

== Reception ==
Media coverage of Bruno Gröning tended to be negative. While some called him a "miracle doctor", the popular press of the time tended to call him a "charlatan" or "crazy". In many towns, Gröning was forbidden from making public appearances. Reasons for this varied. One charge brought against him was that he was practicing medicine without a license. At other times, officials were concerned about the large crowds that gathered.

=== Following ===
Various groups continue to promulgate Gröning's teaching, including the Circle of Information, the Bruno Groening Trust, the Bruno Groening Friends, the Association for the Advancement in Germany of Spiritual and Natural – Psychological Foundations for Living, the Association for Natural Spiritual Living, the Bruno Gröning Circle of Friends, and Help and Healing Sessions.

Gröning founded the Association for the Advancement in 1958 to replace the Gröning Association. The Circle of Friends was founded in 1979 by Grete Hausler, an Austrian school teacher who worked closely with Gröning. The Circle of Information was created by Thomas Busse, who has written a number of books about Gröning and directed the documentary film The Gröning Phenomena. Help and Healing Sessions is an association of independent Groening groups and hosts online meetings.

The Bruno Gröning Circle of Friends was listed as a commercial sect in an official 1997 report by the Berlin Senate Committee. On 23 May 2013, the World Peace Prayer Society (WPPS) awarded the Bruno Gröning Circle of Friends with the Peace Pole Award.
