= Forstbotanischer Garten Tharandt =

Botanical garden specialized on forests

Coordinates: 50°59′04″N 13°34′41″E

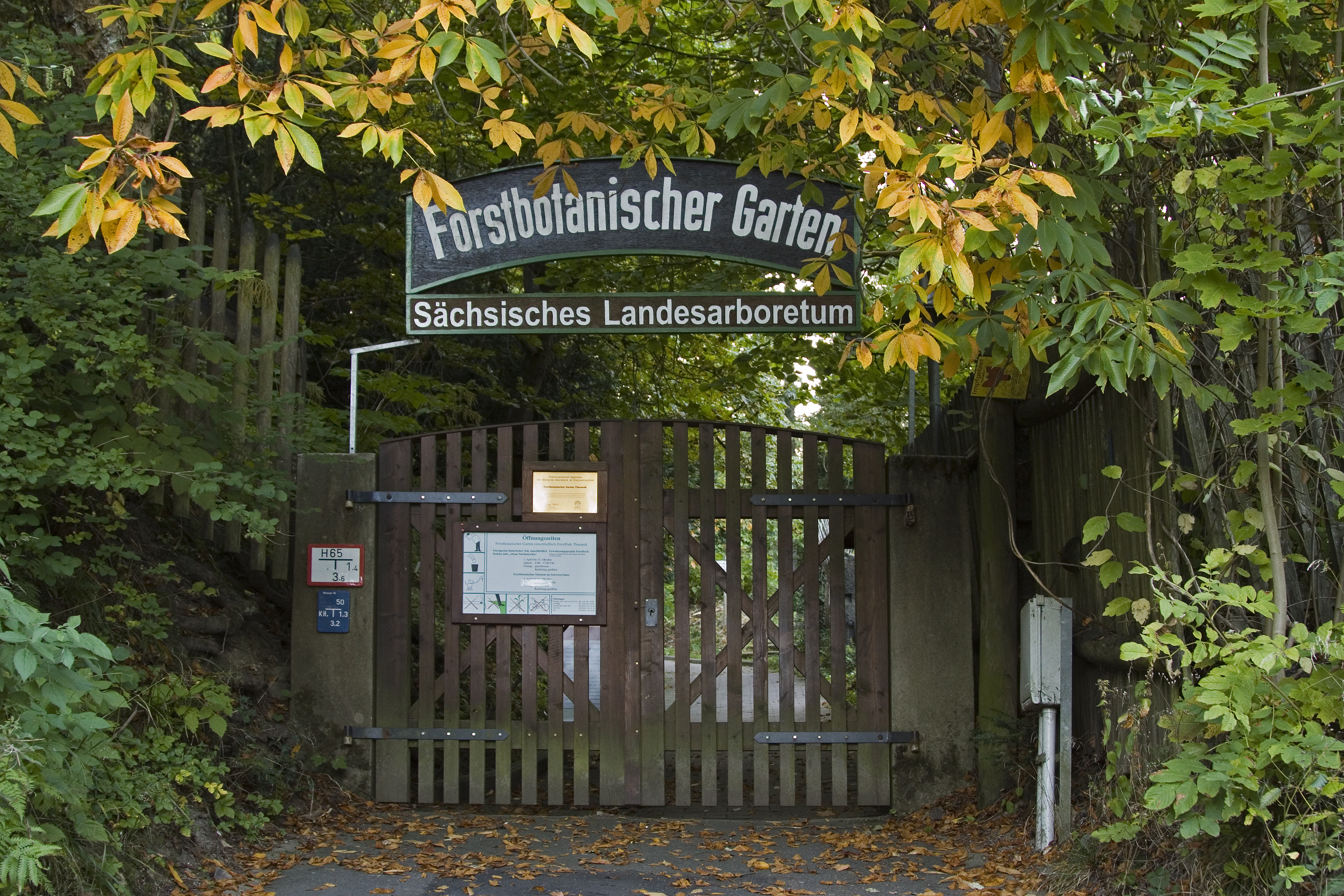
Entrance

The Forstbotanischer Garten Tharandt (lit. 'Forest Botanical Garden of Tharandt'; 33.4 hectares), also known as the Sächsisches Landesarboretum ('Saxony State Arboretum'), is an arboretum maintained by the Dresden University of Technology. It is among the oldest arboreta in the world, and is located at Am Forstgarten 1, Tharandt, Saxony, Germany, and open daily except Friday in the warmer months.

The arboretum was established in 1811 by Heinrich Cotta (1763–1844), founder of the Forestry College in Tharandt. In 1816, it was incorporated into the Royal Saxon Academy of Forestry, and in 1842 augmented by the Schweizerhaus Tharandt, a building in the Swiss style which now houses the arboretum museum. It has subsequently been expanded several times, most recently in 1998 with a new North American section (15 hectares). Today, the arboretum contains about 2,000 species and varieties of woody plants.

== See also ==
- List of botanical gardens in Germany
