= Georg Ludwig Hartig =

German forester (1764–1837)

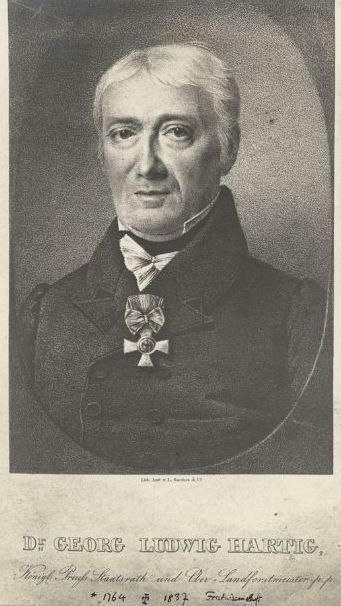
Georg Ludwig Hartig

Georg Ludwig Hartig (September 2, 1764 – February 2, 1837) was a German forester. Along with Heinrich Cotta he helped establish scientific forestry in Prussia, serving as the chief forester from 1811 and giving lectures on forestry at the University of Berlin from 1838 where he served as a professor. He established the goals of sustainable forestry and wrote several influential textbook for foresters.

== Education ==
Hartig was born at Gladenbach, in present-day Hesse, to Friedrich Christian and Sophie Catherine née Venator. After obtaining practical knowledge of forestry from his uncle Karl Ludwig Hartig at Harzburg, he studied from 1781 to 1783 at the University of Giessen, which had commenced a course of instruction in forestry just a few years earlier, in 1778.

== Career ==
In 1786, Hartig was appointed as Manager of Forests for the Prince of Solms-Braunfels at Hungen, in the Wetterau, Hesse. While in this position, he founded a school for the teaching of forestry, one of the first dedicated schools of forestry in Europe.

After a decade in Hungen, in 1797, he received an appointment as Inspector of Forests to the Prince of Orange-Nassau, to succeed the position of Friedrich Ludwig von Witzleben, and moved to Dillenburg, continuing his school of forestry there. Attendance increased considerably in Dillenburg. On the dissolution of the principality by Napoleon I of France in 1805 he lost his position.

In 1806, Hartig went to Stuttgart as Chief Inspector of Forests. Five years later, in 1811, he was called to Berlin in a similar capacity. There he reestablished his school once again, succeeding in connecting it with the University of Berlin. Along with Heinrich Cotta he began to establish forestry as a scientific discipline in Prussia. He wrote several textbooks on forestry.

Hartig received an appointment as Honorary Professor at the University of Berlin in 1830. He died at Berlin on 2 February 1837.

Hartig recognized ecological interactions as being important in forest conservation and wrote about matters such as soil variations, plant sociology, and the damage caused by leaf litter removal. He conducted experiments to study the growth and production of wood, the heat produced by different woods, and their methods to enhance the durability of wood. He was concerned about the efficiency of heating and fireplaces. In his 1791 work on the taxation of forests he defined sustainability as being possible only if “future generations derive at least as many benefits from it as the current generation.”

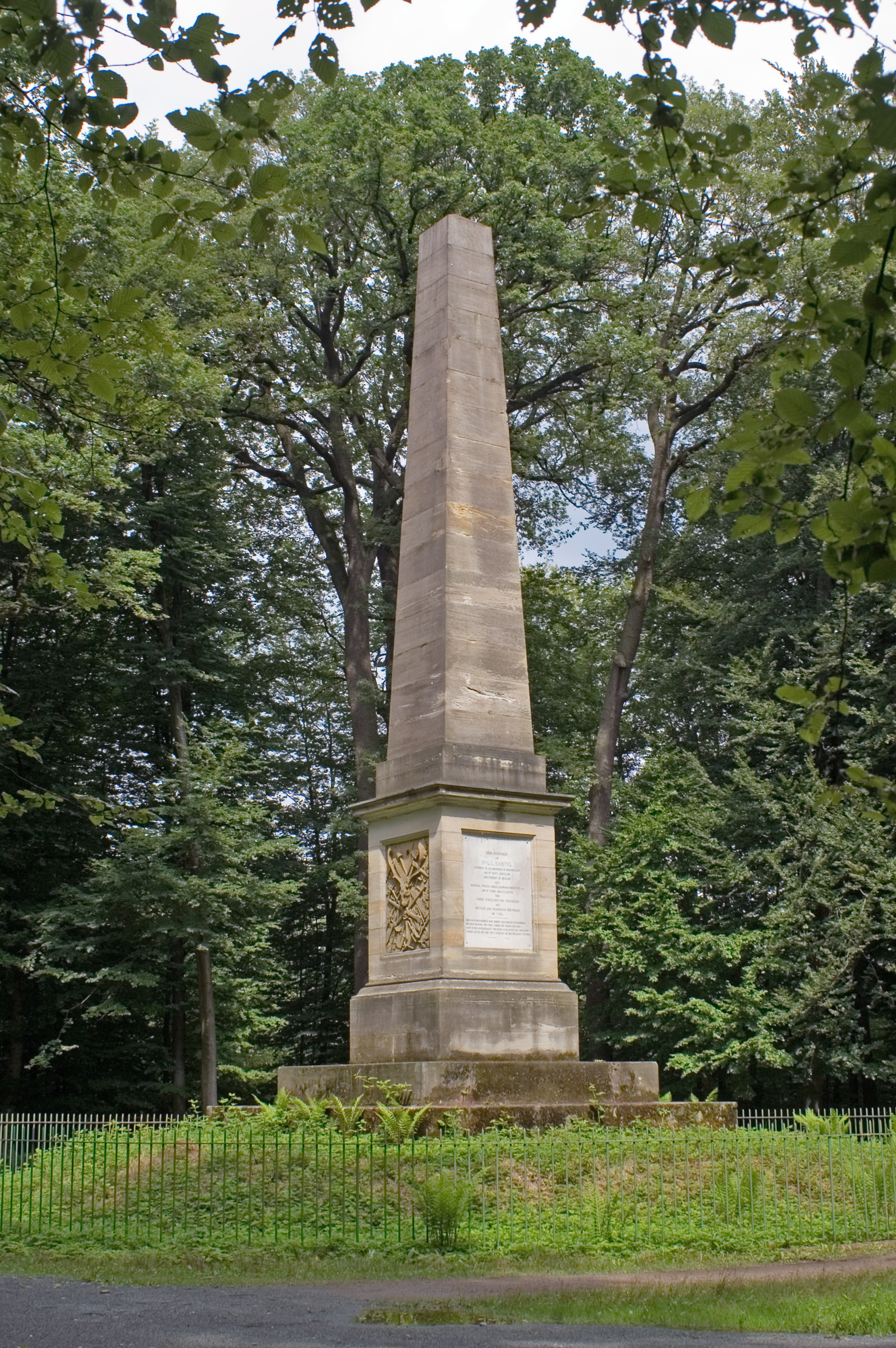
Hartig memorial in Darmstadt

== Family ==
Hartig married Theodora in 1787. She was the daughter of Jakob Christian Klipstein of Darmstadt. They had 9 sons and 4 daughters. His son Theodor Hartig and grandson Robert Hartig also were distinguished for their contributions to the study of forestry.

== Works (selection) ==
- Anweisung zur Holzzucht für Förster, Marburg 1791 (Directions for Wood-breeding for Foresters)
- Physicalische Versuche über das Verhältniß der Brennbarkeit der meisten deutschen Wald-Baum-Hölzer...etc., 1794
- Anweisung zur Taxation der Forste oder zur Bestimmung des Holzertrags der Wälder...etc., Gießen 1795
- Grundsätze der Forst-Direktion, Hadamer: Neue Gelehrten Buchhandlung 1803
- Lehrbuch für Förster und die es werden wollen...etc.,(3 vols.), Stuttgart 1808 (Textbook for Foresters and ...)
- Kubiktabellen für geschnittene, beschlagene und runde Hölzer...etc., 1815 (4th ed. Berlin and Elbing, 1837; 10th ed. Berlin, 1871)
- Lehrbuch für Jäger und die es werden wollen...etc., (2 vols.), Stuttgart 1810/1812 (Textbook for Hunters and...)
- Beitrag zur Lehre von der Ablösung der Holz-, Streu- und Weideservituten, Berlin 1829
- Die Forstwissenschaft in ihrem Umfange...etc., Berlin 1831 (Forest Science in its Scope...)
- Lexikon für Jäger und Jagdfreunde oder waidmännisches Conversations-Lexikon, 1836 (2nd ed. Berlin, 1859–1861) (Lexicon for Hunters and Hunting Companions or the Country-Sportsman's Conversations-Lexicon)

== Literature ==
- Hans Joachim Weimann: Hartigiana - Kurze Lebens- und Familiengeschichte des Staatsrathes und Ober-Landforstmeisters Georg Ludwig Hartig und dessen Gattin Theodore, geborene Klipstein. Wiesbaden 1990
- ders: Georg Ludwig Hartig in: Biographien bedeutender hessischer Forstleute. Georg-Ludwig-Hartig-Stiftung & J. D. Sauerländer, Wiesbaden und Frankfurt am Main 1990. ISBN 3-7939-0780-5
- Theodora Hartig, Karl Hasel, Wilhelm Mantel (eds.): Georg Ludwig Hartig im Kreise seiner Familie. Kurze Lebens- und Familiengeschichte des Staatsrats und Oberlandforstmeisters Georg Ludwig Hartig. Göttingen 1976
- Autorenkollektiv: Georg Ludwig Hartig (1764–1837) zum 150. Todestage. (Festakt zum 11. März 1987 in Gladenbach; Vorträge und Dokumentation.) Mitteilungen der Hessischen Landesforstverwaltung, Band 21. Sauerländer, Frankfurt am Main 1987, ISBN 3-89051-064-7

== Other sources ==
- Baynes, T. S.; Smith, W. R., eds. (1880). "Hartig, Georg Ludwig" . Encyclopædia Britannica. Vol. 11 (9th ed.). New York: Charles Scribner's Sons.
