= Royal Saxon Academy of Forestry =

The Royal Saxon Academy of Forestry (German: Königliche-Sächsische Forstakademie) in Tharandt, Saxony, near Dresden, was founded by silviculturist Heinrich Cotta in 1811. Established in conjunction with the school, and later integrated with it, was the Forstbotanischer Garten Tharandt, one of the oldest arboreta in the world. Its legacy lives on today as a campus of the Dresden University of Technology and site of that institution's Department of Forestry.

== History ==
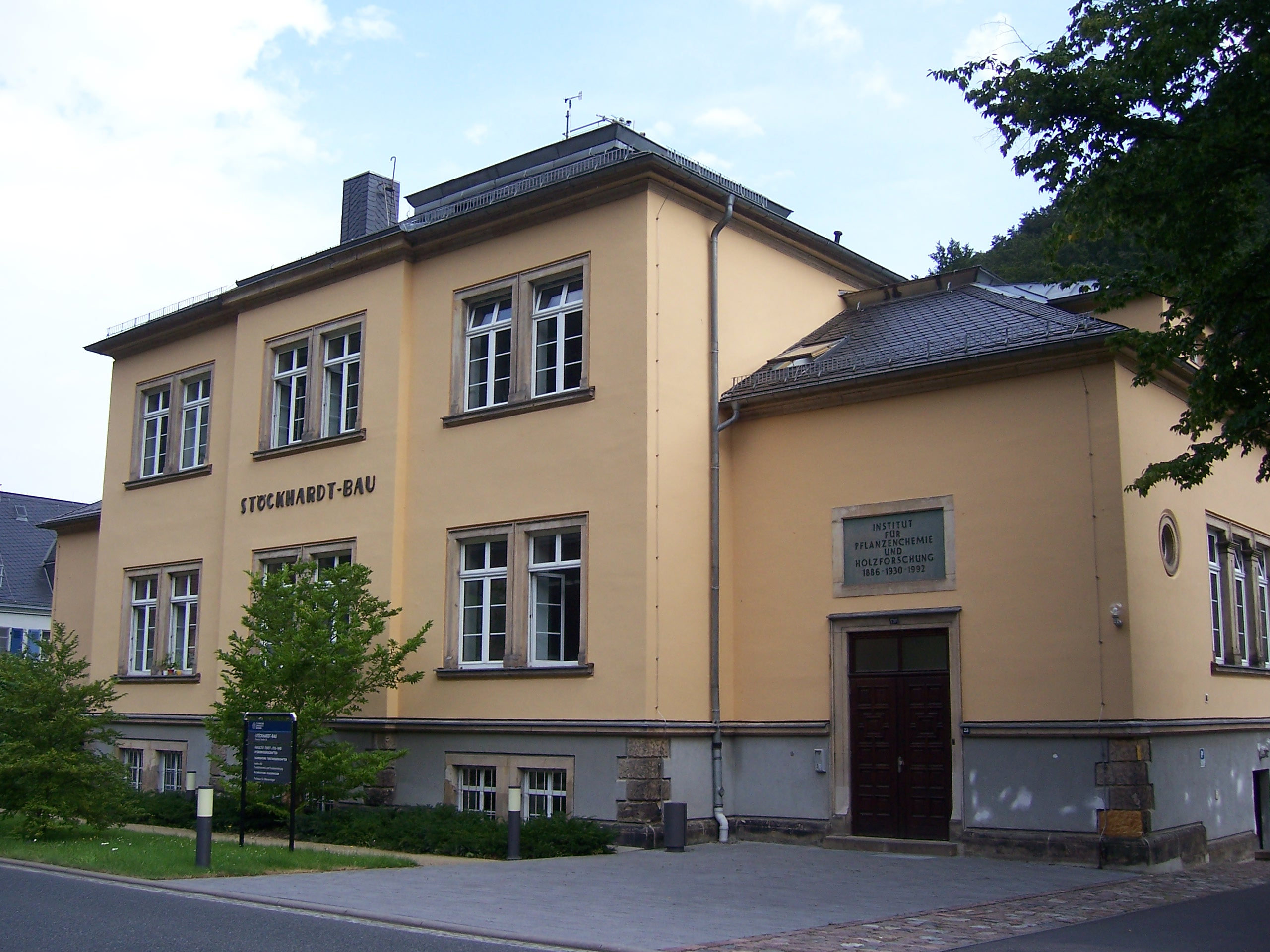
Academy building named after Julius Adolph Stöckhardt, chemist and faculty member, 1847-1883

In Saxony, as in other parts of Germany, there were concerns that forests might be over-exploited and needed to be properly managed. In 1810, Heinrich Cotta was appointed to a government forestry post under Frederick Augustus I of Saxony. He also taught forestry, but the forestry school was initially run on a private basis. In 1813, the school was visited by Johann Wolfgang von Goethe. In 1816, after the end of the Napoleonic Wars, Cotta obtained state support for the school, which became the Königlich-Sächsische Forstakademie. Apart from Germans, it attracted a number of foreign students, including a contingent from Russia. In 1841 Cotta was given an award by Tsar Nicholas I in recognition of his efforts at Tharandt.

By the time of German reunification in 1990, the College of Forestry (Forstliche Hochschule) had already been integrated into the Dresden University of Technology (DUT).

== Arboretum ==
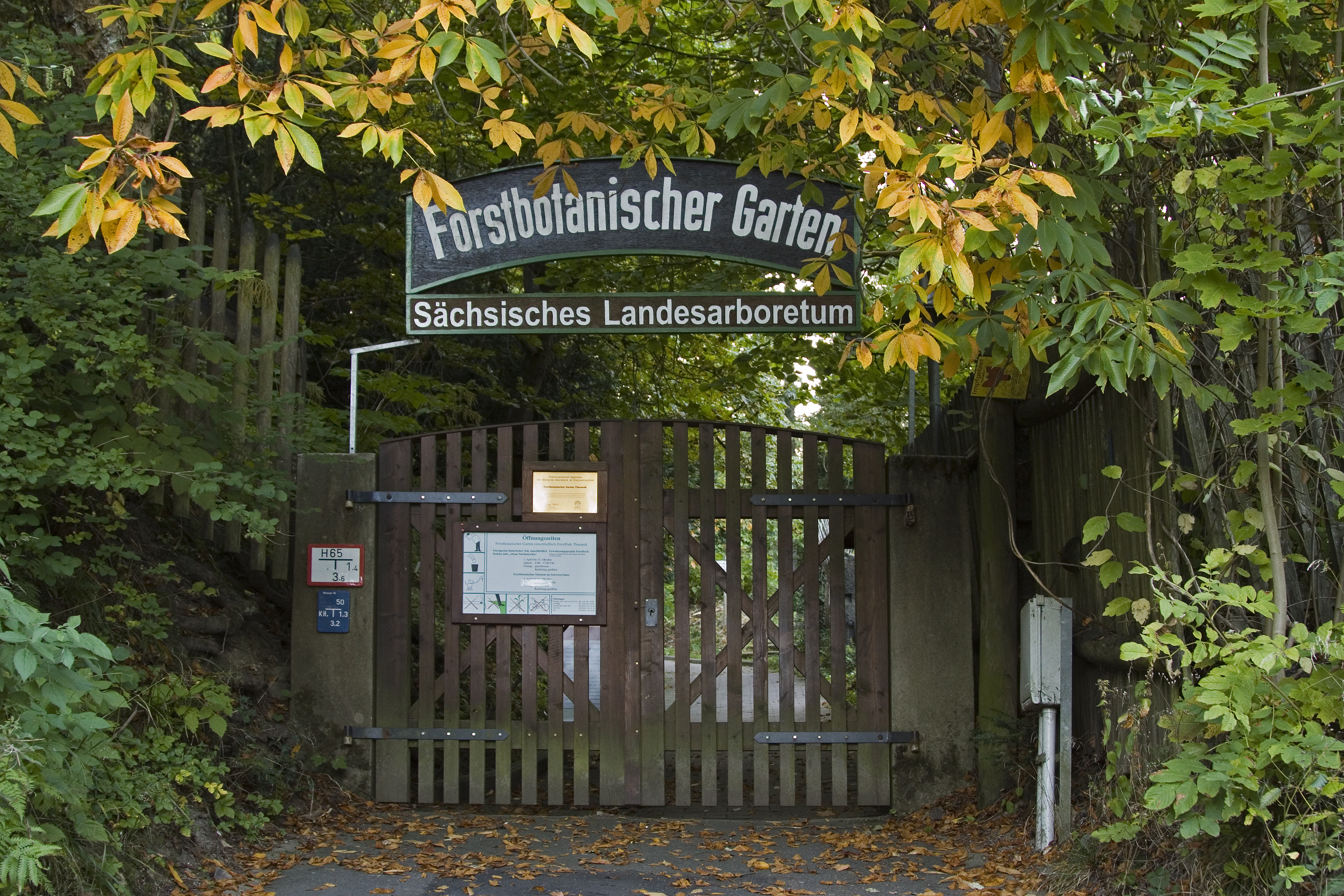
Entrance gate, Forstbotanischer Garten

Among the oldest arboreta in the world, the Forstbotanischer Garten Tharandt, was established by Cotta in the same year as the Academy. Five years later, in 1816, it was integrated administratively with the College.

Today it belongs to the Faculty of Environmental Sciences of the Dresden University. It is open to the public from April to October, and the admission is free of charge.

== Legacy ==
The school lives on today as a campus of the Dresden University of Technology, and site of its Department of Forestry, which continues to train foresters.

The arboretum was expanded most recently in 1998. Today it contains some 2,000 species and varieties of woody plants. Its museum is housed in the Schweizerhaus Tharandt.

In 2002, a severe flood destroyed many of the academy buildings and the library, including some of its more-than-500-year-old books.

The academy was rebuilt and today has about 650 students and is famous for its long traditions of educating students from all over the world in forestry (including a programme in tropical forestry), resource management and sustainable land use.

== See also ==
- Forstbotanischer Garten Tharandt
- Heinrich Cotta
- Samuel Friedrich Stein
- Julius Adolph Stöckhardt
- Tharandt
