= Laurie Heyer =

American mathematician

Laurie J. Heyer is an American mathematician specializing in genomics and bioinformatics. She is Kimbrough Professor of Mathematics at Davidson College, director of Davidson's Jay Hurt Hub for Innovation and Entrepreneurship, and former chair of Davidson's Mathematics and Computer Science Department.

== Education ==
Heyer is a graduate of the University of Texas at Arlington. She completed her Ph.D. in 1998 at the University of Colorado Boulder. Her dissertation, The Probabilistic Behavior of Sequence Analysis Scores with Application to Structural Alignment of RNA, was jointly supervised by John A. Williamson and Gary Stormo.

== Textbooks ==
With Malcolm Campbell, Heyer is the author of the textbook Discovering Genomics, Proteomics, & Bioinformatics (Benjamin Cummings and Cold Spring Harbor Laboratory Press, 2003; 2nd ed., Pearson, 2007). Campbell, Heyer, and Christopher Paradise also wrote the electronic text Integrating Concepts in Biology.
