= Dillenburg =

- Town
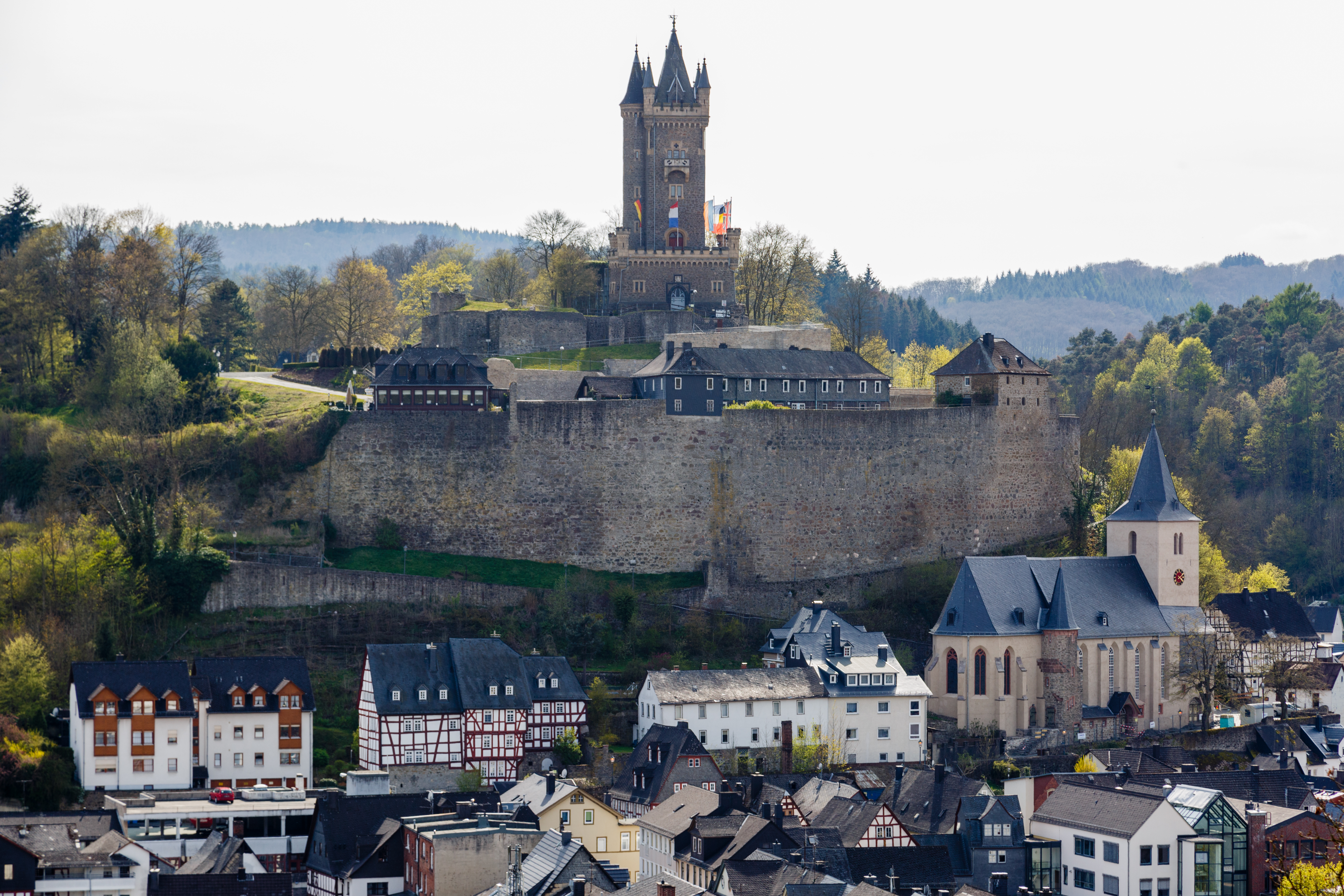
- Dillenburg - View on the Wilhelmsturm and the old town

- Coat of arms

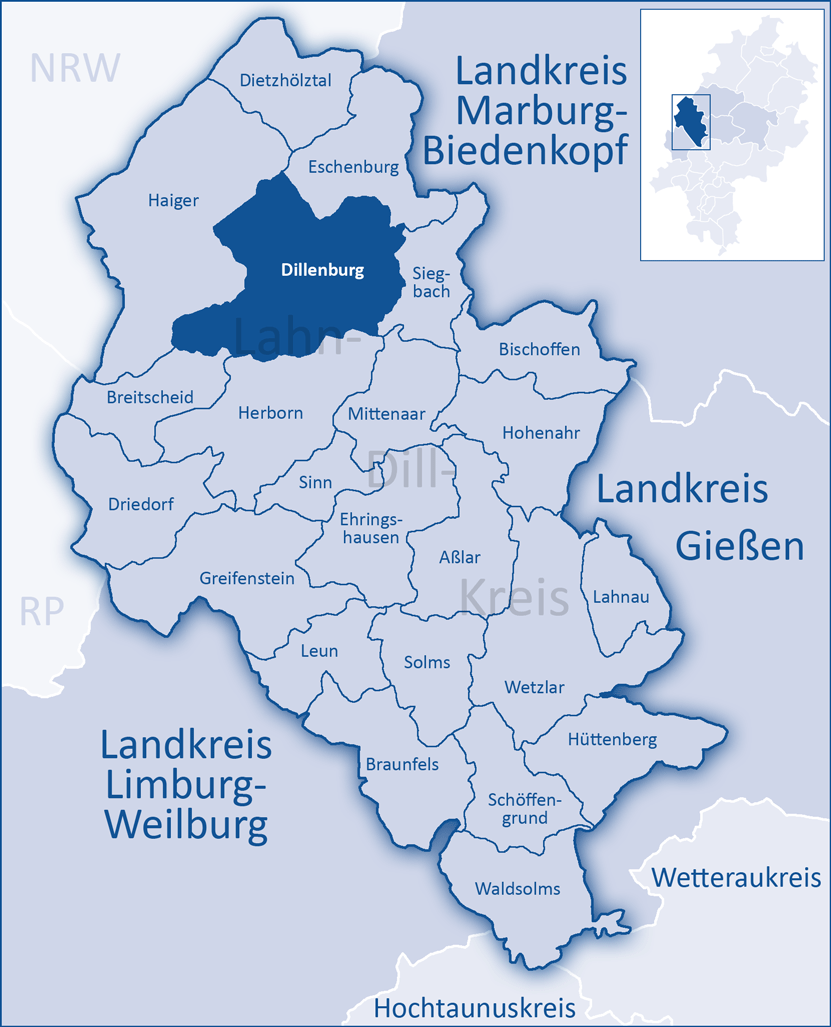
- Location of Dillenburg within Lahn-Dill-Kreis district
- Interactive map of Dillenburg
- Location within Germany Location within Hesse
- Coordinates: 50°44′N 08°17′E
- Country: Germany
- State: Hesse
- Admin. region: Gießen
- District: Lahn-Dill-Kreis

Government
  - Mayor (2019–25): Michael Lotz (CDU)

Area
  - Total: 83.76 km^{2} (32.34 sq mi)
- Elevation: 230–590 m (750–1,940 ft)

Population (2025-12-31)
  - Total: 22,895
  - Density: 273.3/km^{2} (707.9/sq mi)
- Time zone: UTC+01:00 (CET)
  - Summer (DST): UTC+02:00 (CEST)
- Postal codes: 35661–35690
- Dialling codes: 02771
- Vehicle registration: LDK, DIL
- Website: www.dillenburg.de

Dillenburg (German pronunciation: [ˈdɪlənbʊʁk]), officially Oranienstadt Dillenburg, is a town in Hesse's Gießen region in Germany. The town was formerly the seat of the old Dillkreis district, which is now part of the Lahn-Dill-Kreis.

The town lies on the German-Dutch holiday road called the Orange Route, joining towns, cities and regions associated with the House of Orange-Nassau, as well as on the German Timber-Frame Road and the Rothaarsteig hiking trail.

== Geography ==
=== Location ===
Dillenburg lies on the eastern edge of the Westerwald range in the narrow valley of the river Dill, which flows from Hesse-Westphalia border to Wetzlar, emptying into the Lahn. The Dietzhölze flows into the Dill in Dillenburg.

Dillenburg downtown area

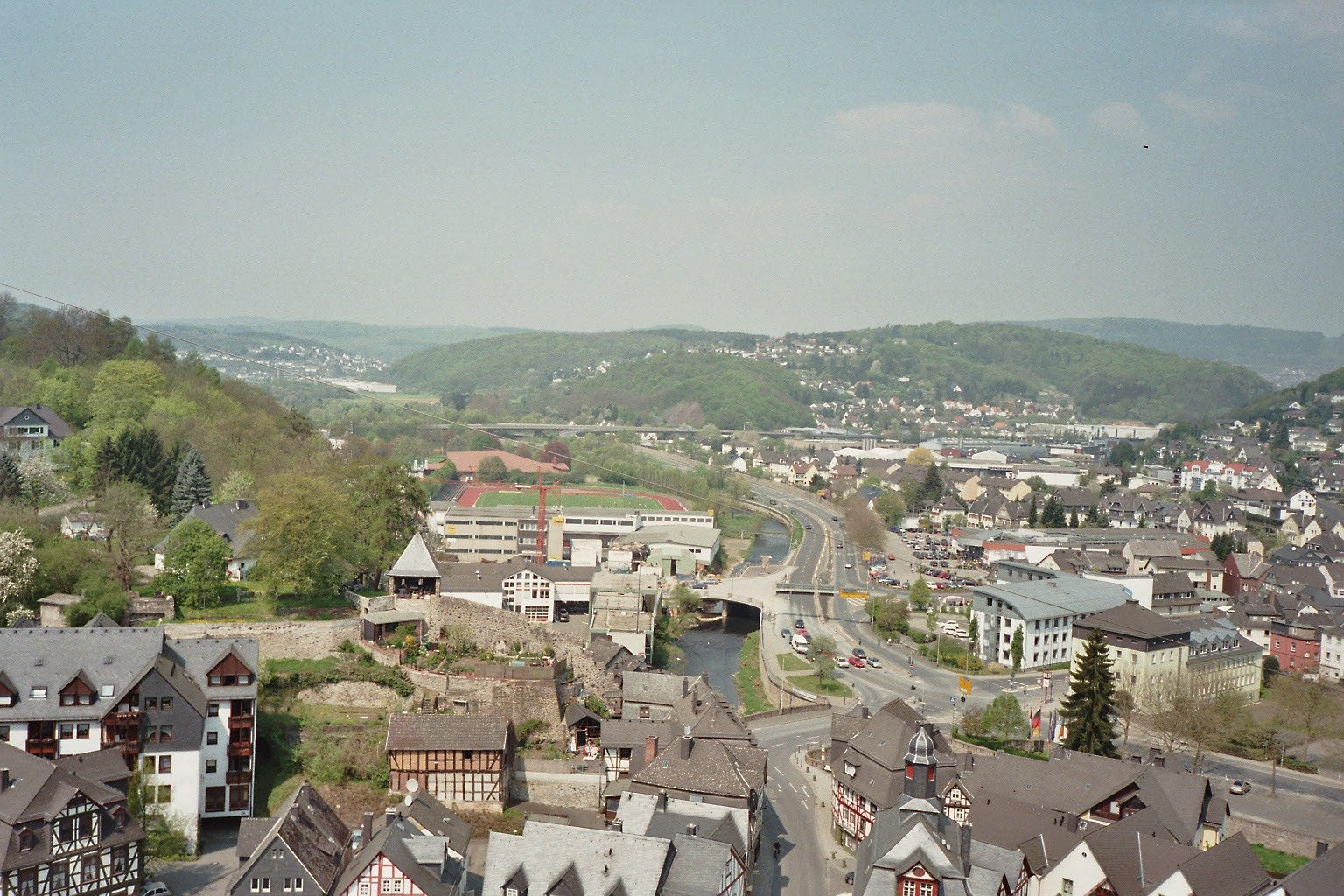
View of town looking north from Wilhelmsturm

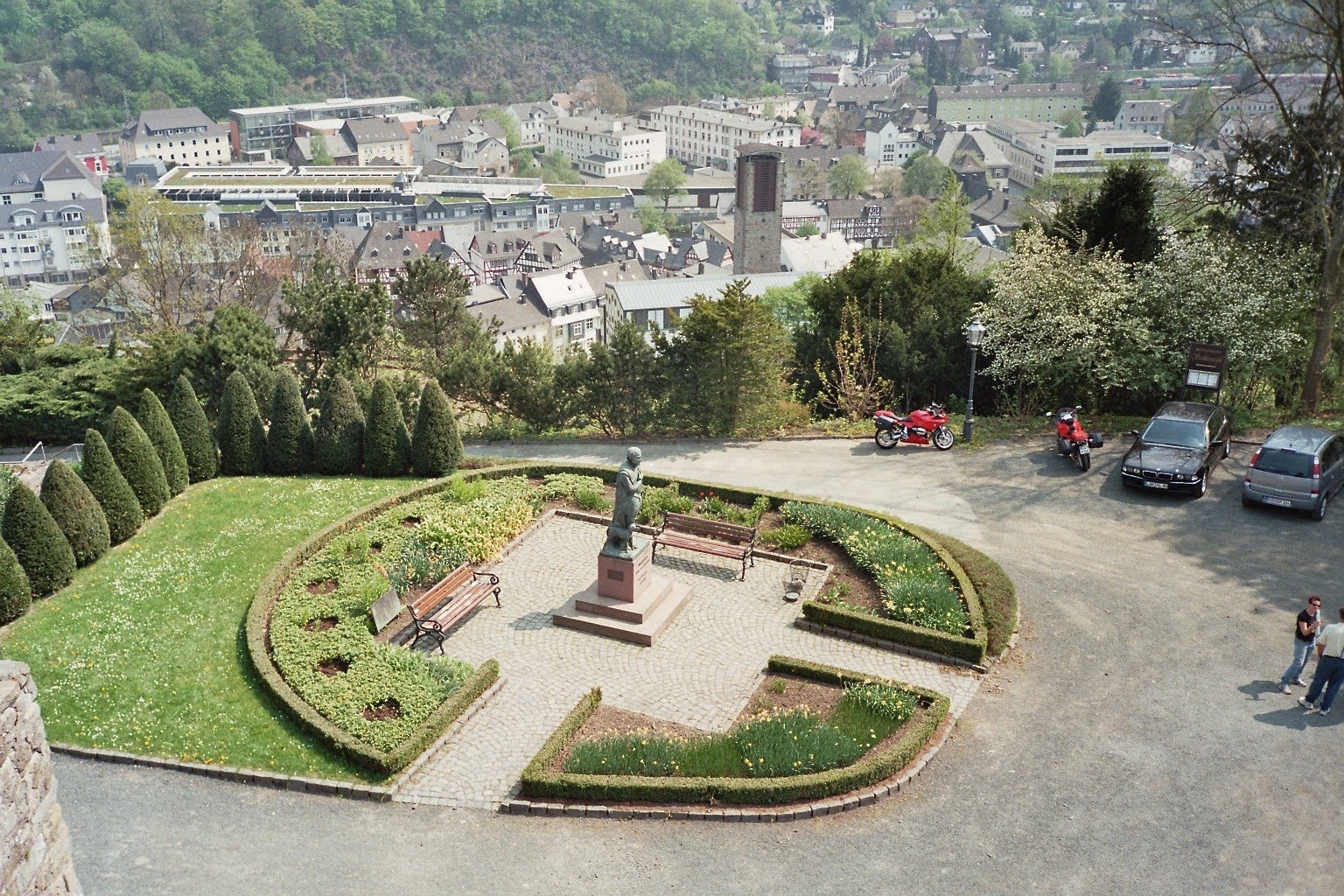
View of the town looking south from Wilhelmsturm tower

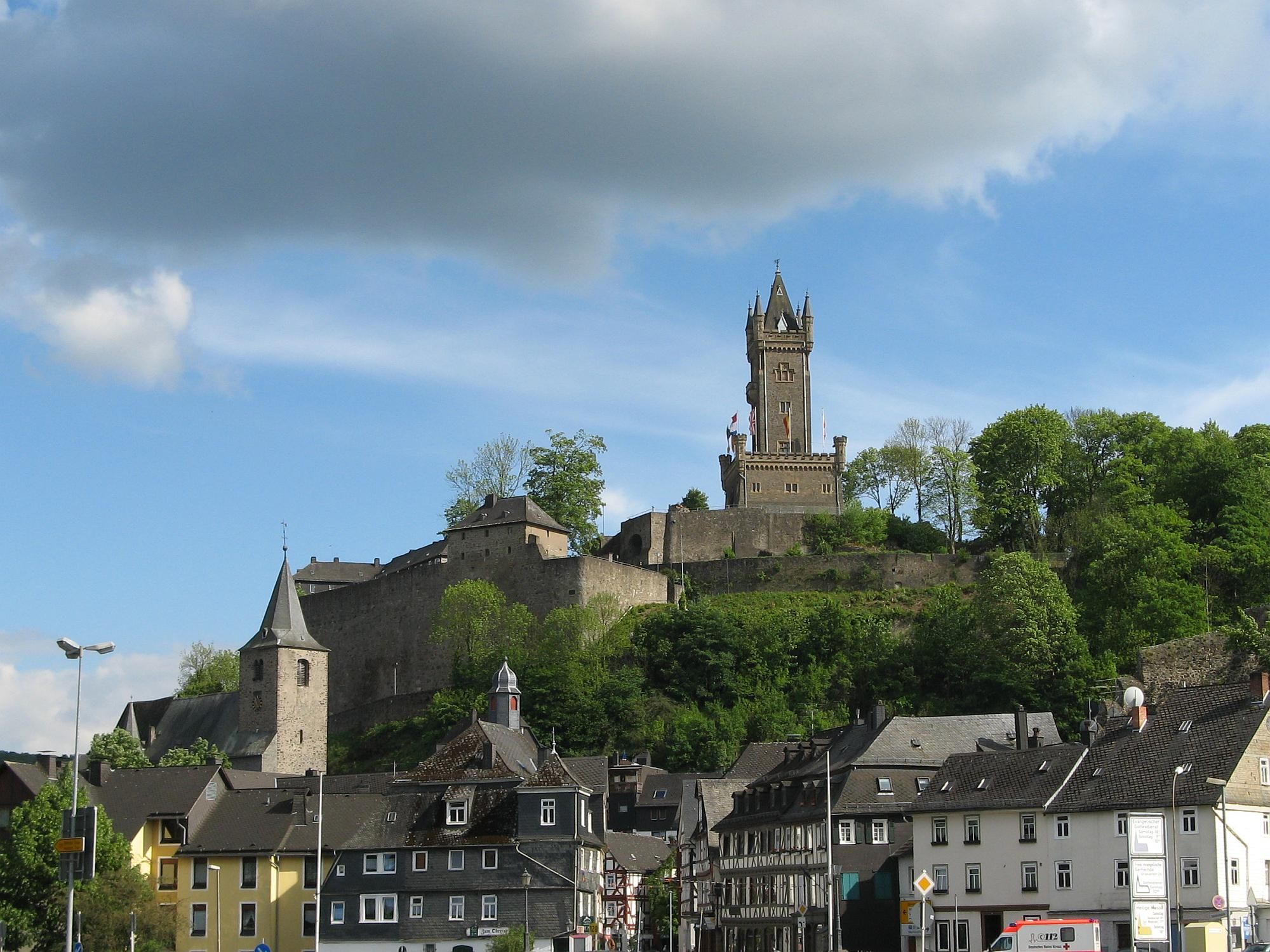
Wilhelmsturm, Dillenburg's major landmark

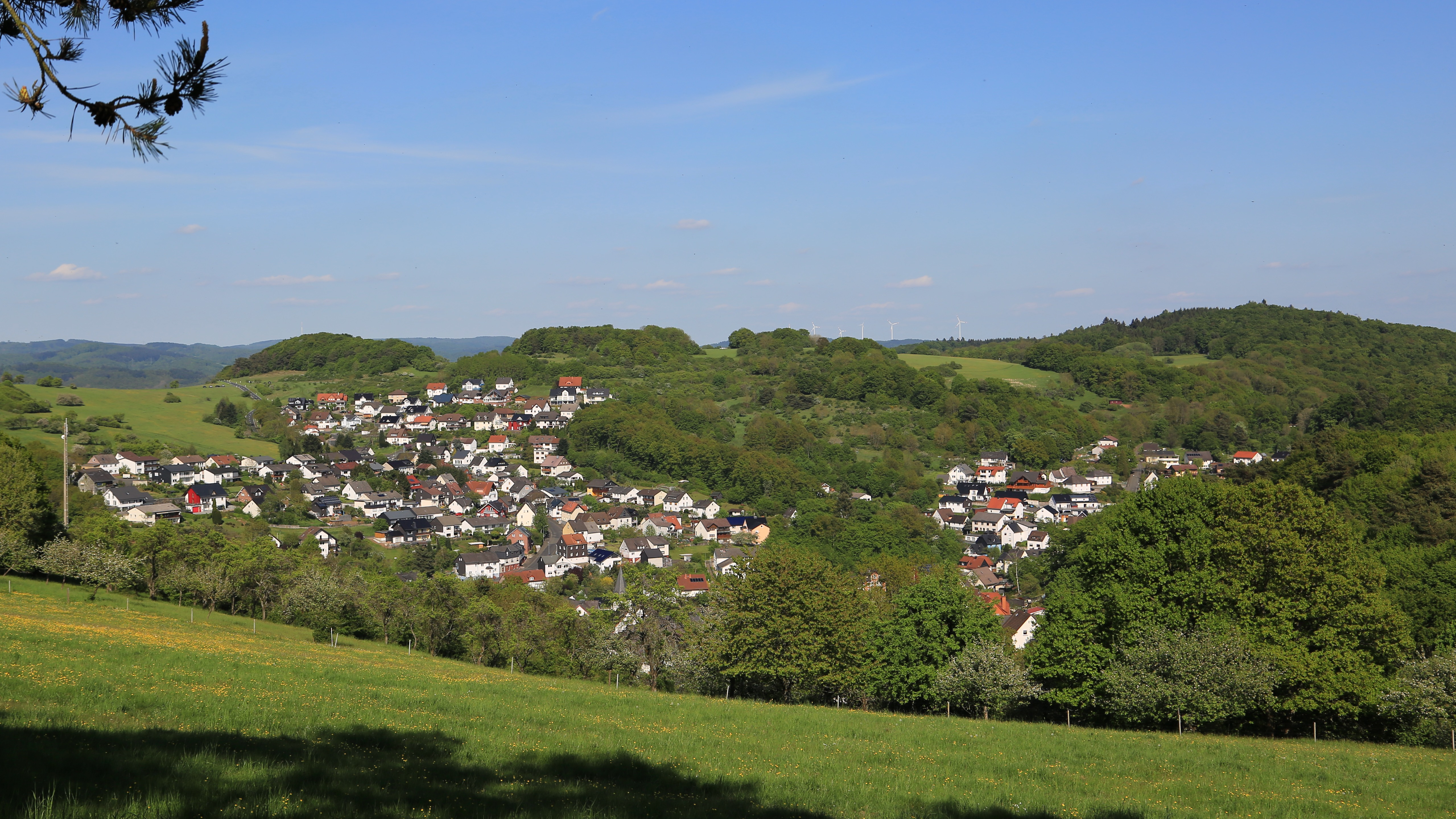
Donsbach

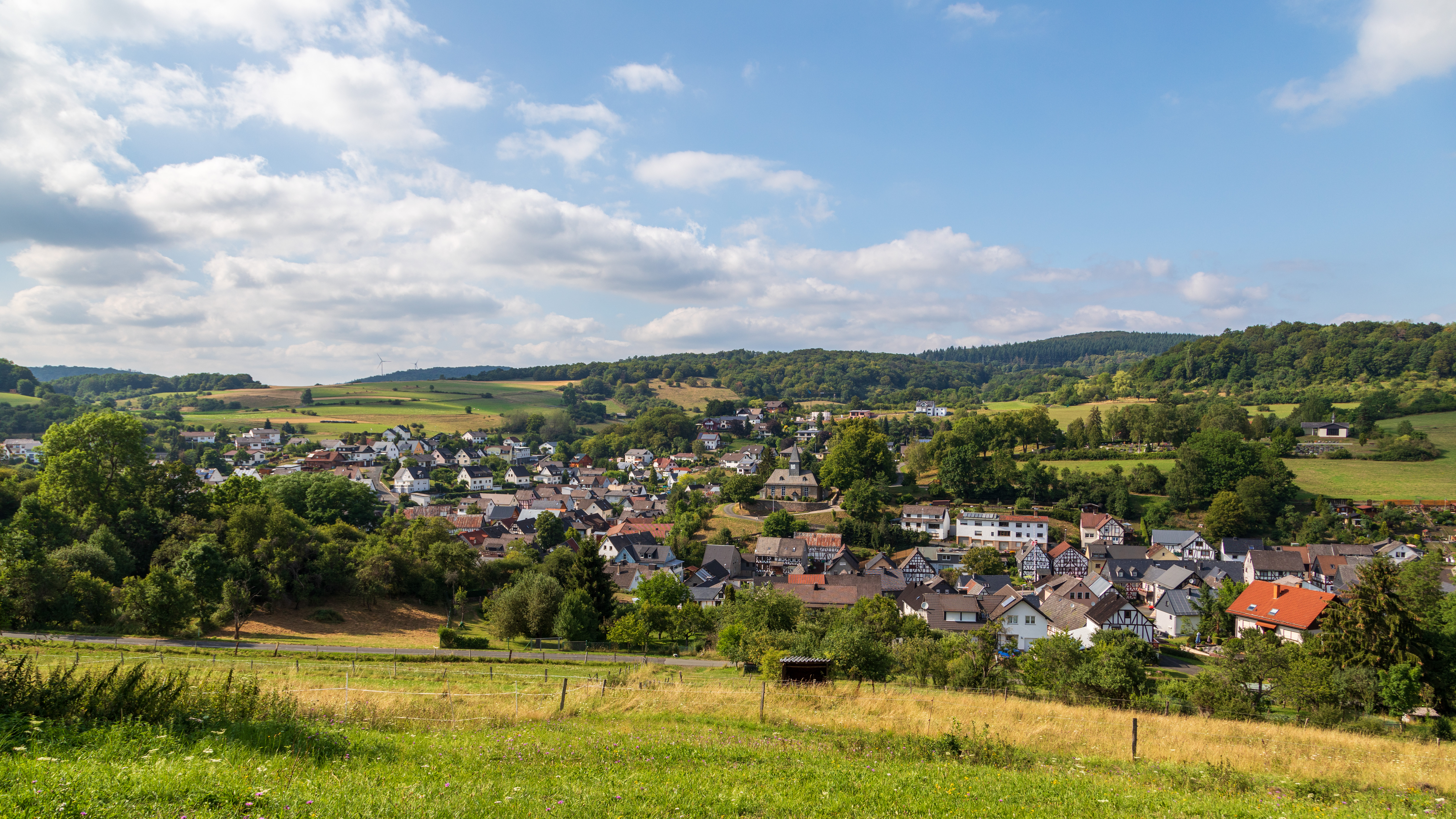
Eibach

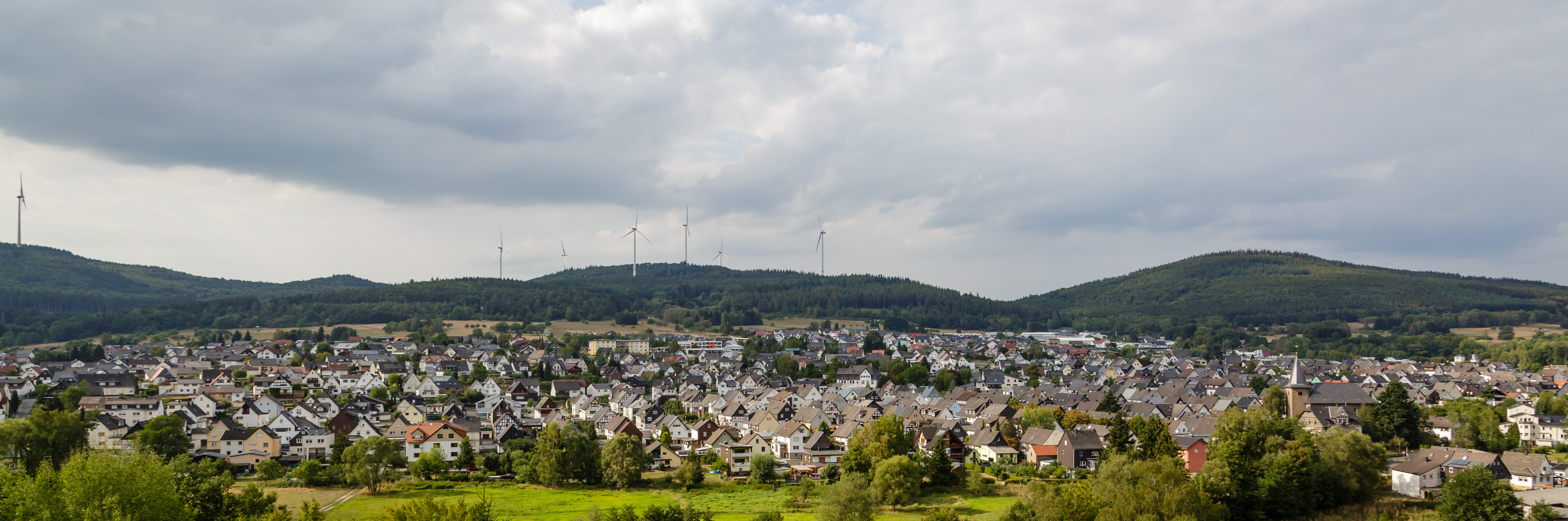
Frohnhausen

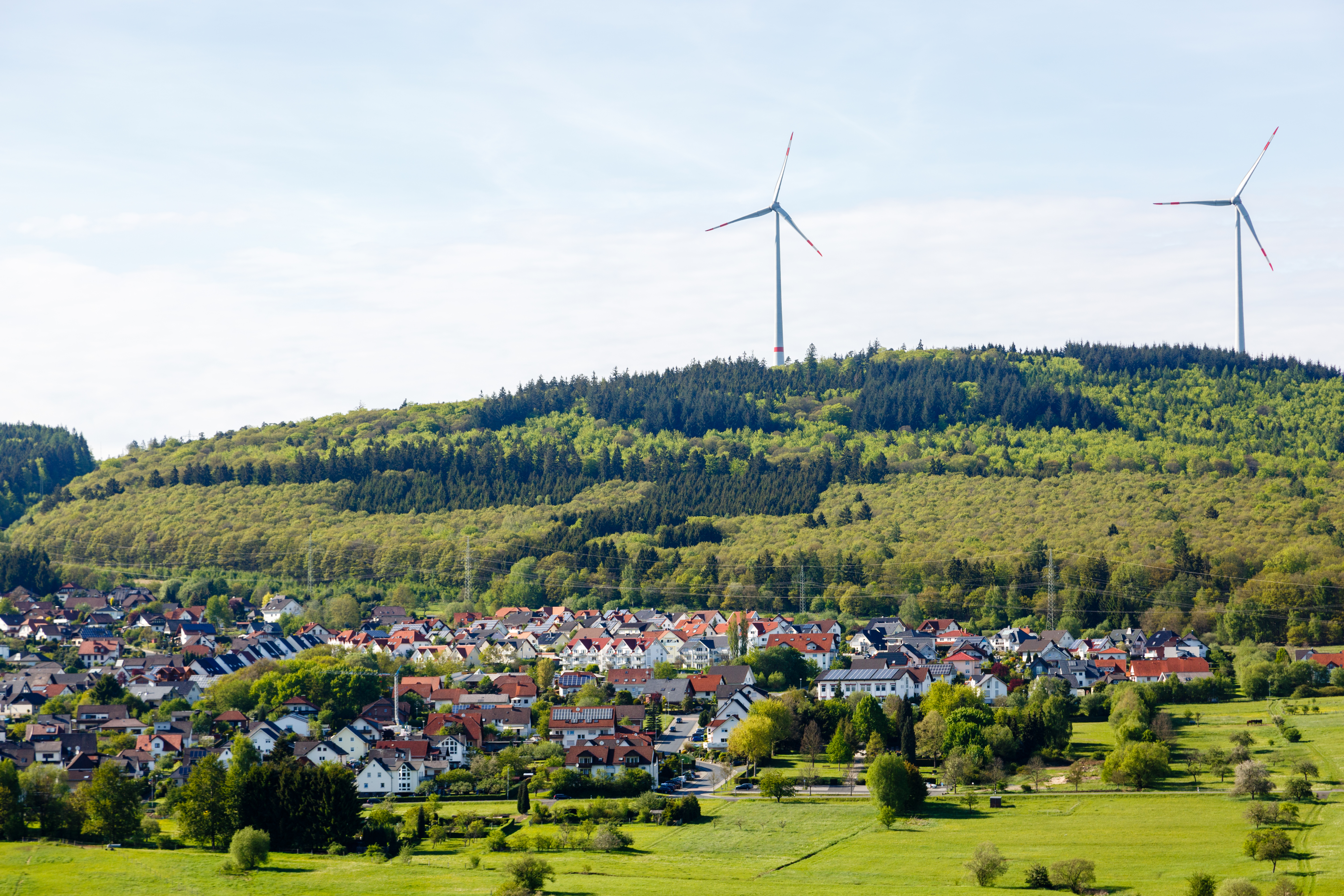
Manderbach

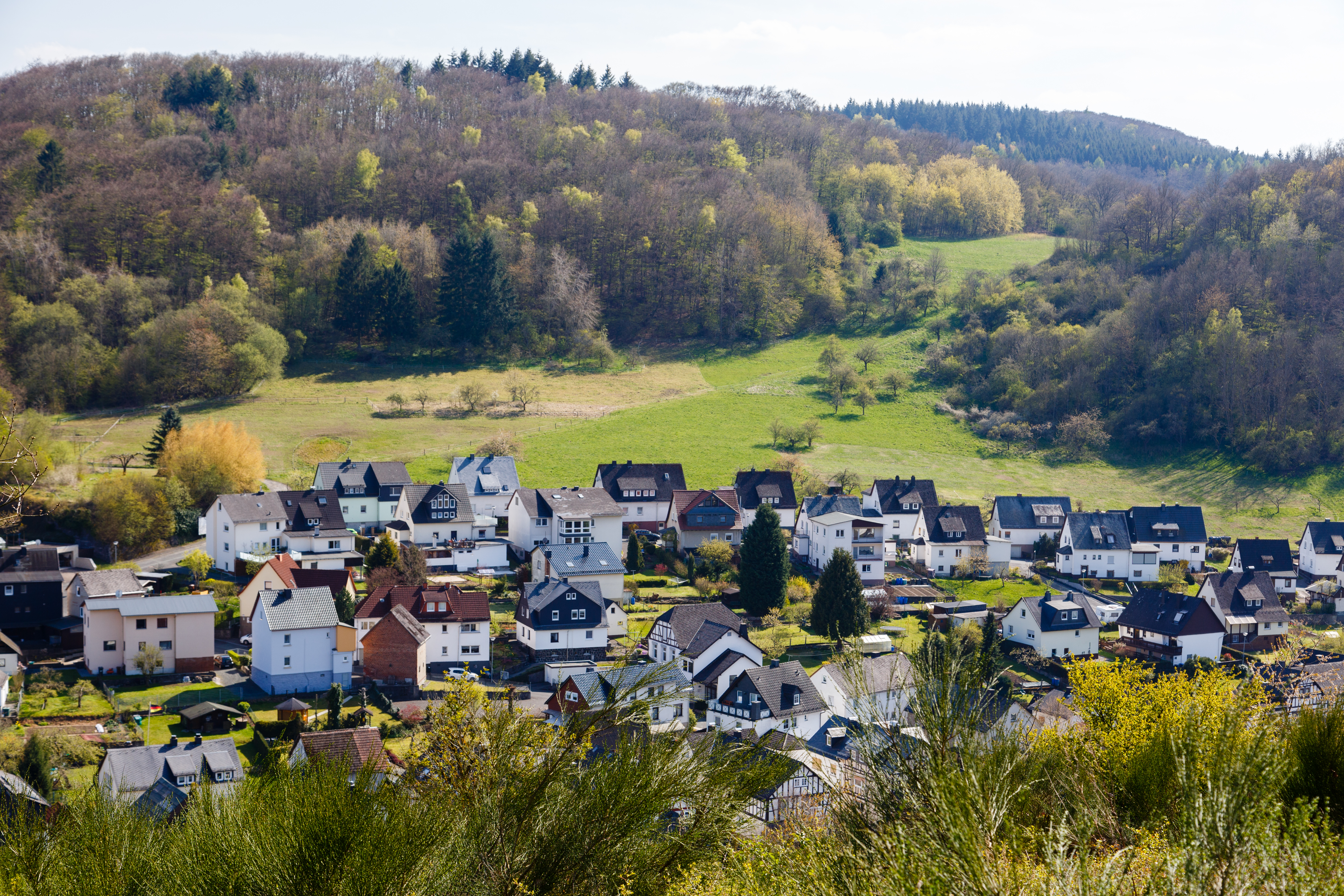
Nanzenbach

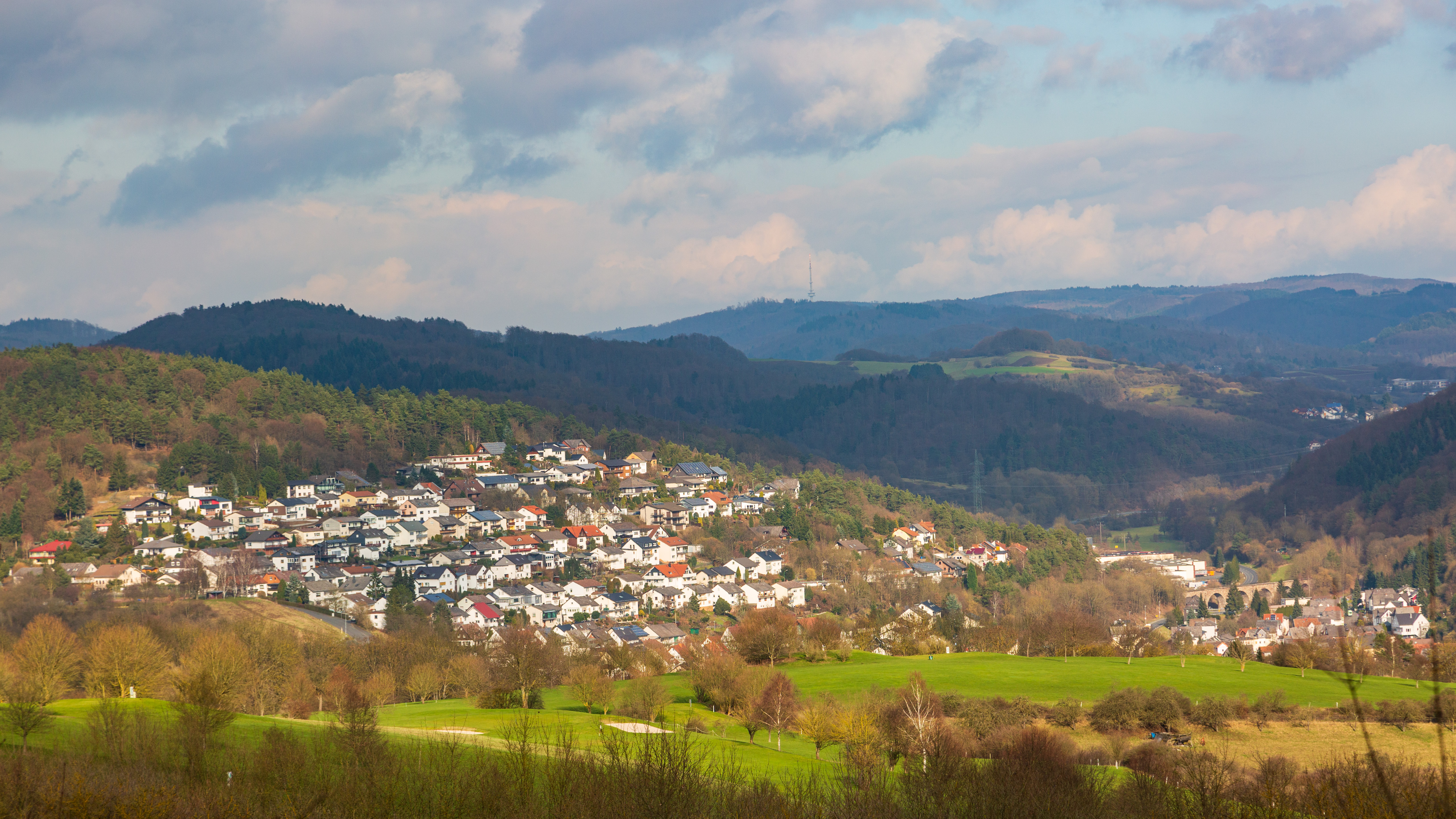
Niederscheld

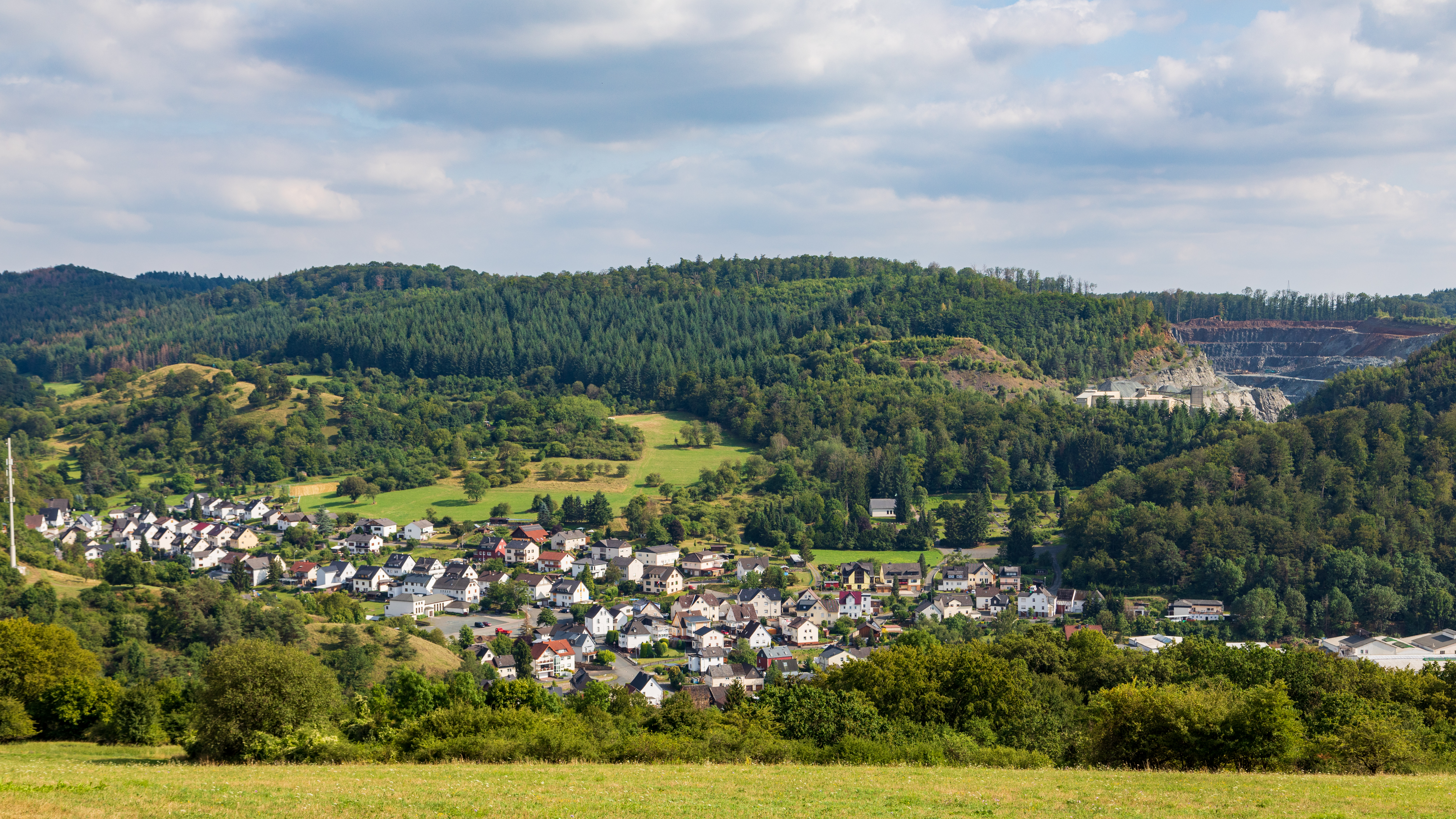
Oberscheld

=== Neighbouring communities ===
Dillenburg borders in the north on the community of Eschenburg, in the east on the community of Siegbach, in the south on the town of Herborn, and the community of Breitscheid, and in the west on the town of Haiger (all in the Lahn-Dill-Kreis).

=== Constituent communities ===
Dillenburg is divided into the centres of Donsbach, Eibach, Frohnhausen, Manderbach, Nanzenbach, Niederscheld and Oberscheld.

==== Donsbach ====
Donsbach lies approximately 4 km southwest of the Dillenburg main town.

==== Eibach ====
Eibach has some 1,450 inhabitants.

The village, whose livelihood was once based on mining, lies among the other constituent communities of Nanzenbach, Oberscheld and Niederscheld. Its healing spring, whose water is heavy with iron, makes the village a favourite among locals. At Eastertime, it is decorated.

==== Frohnhausen ====
With roughly 3,900 inhabitants, Frohnhausen is the largest of the constituent communities after the main town of Dillenburg.

==== Manderbach ====
Manderbach lies on a plateau 3 km north of the main town of Dillenburg.

==== Nanzenbach ====
Nanzenbach lies approximately 6 km north of the main town of Dillenburg. The tallest mountain of Dillenburg, the Eschenburg at an elevation of 589 m, is part of the Nanzenbach area.

==== Niederscheld ====
Niederscheld is a village with about 3000 inhabitants, lying 2 km from the main town of Dillenburg. The name comes from a small brook called the Schelde that rises between Oberscheld and Tringenstein and flows into the Dill at Niederscheld. The village's greatest hallmarks are the old blast furnace and the Adolfshütte industrial park. Towards the end of the Second World War, the village suffered comparatively heavy damage from Allied air raids. Niederscheld had been appointed a target, because parts for the V-2 rocket were built at the Adolfshütte.

==== Oberscheld ====
Oberscheld is a village of about 2,000 inhabitants. It neighbours Niederscheld. Mining was quite important for Oberscheld until the last blast furnace was closed in 1969. Oberscheld had a station, the last train ran in Oberscheld in 1987.

== History ==
Dillenburg had its first documentary mention in 1254. Dillenburg was the ancestral seat of the Orange branch of the House of Nassau. Dillenburg Castle was built on top of the peak now called the Schlossberg in the late 13th or early 14th century. There are no pictures of this castle, however, as it was wooden, and was destroyed in the Dernbacher Feud.

From his stately home in exile, William I of Orange-Nassau, who was born in Dillenburg, organized the Dutch resistance against Spain (1567–1572), which still occasions regular Dutch royal visits to the town to this day. The land was administered by the presidents of the House of Nassau-Dillenburg. One of the last presidents was Georg Ernst Ludwig Freiherr von Preuschen von und zu Liebenstein (born 1727 in Diethardt; died 1794 in Bad Ems). In the Seven Years' War, the stately home was destroyed (1760), and Wilhelmstraße (a street) was built out of the remains.

In 1797, one of the earliest schools of forestry in Europe, founded a decade earlier at Hungen by Georg Ludwig Hartig, was moved to Dillenburg. It continued in Dillenburg until 1805, when Hartig lost his position as Inspector of Forests for the Prince of Orange-Nassau, when the principality was dissolved by Napoleon.

In 1875, the Wilhelmsturm (tower), views from which can be seen in this article, was completed on the Schlossberg. It is today the town's landmark. The "casemates" under the former stately home are among the biggest defensive works in Europe. They have been partly excavated and may be toured.

In the 19th century came the Industrial Revolution with the building of the Deutz–Gießen railway and the use of iron ore found on the Lahn, Dill and Sieg. Many mines, foundries and metalworking operations came into being in the region. In this time, many railway branchlines were built from Dillenburg to, among other places, Gönnern and Ewersbach. These lines have all been abandoned now. The line to Gönnern was abandoned in 1987 and torn up. The railway depot, so useful in the time of steam traction, was shut down in 1983.

In the Second World War, Dillenburg became a target of Allied attacks due to its marshalling yard. In later years that yard was closed and ore mining became ever less profitable and in 1968, the last blast furnace, in Oberscheld, ceased operations.

As of November 2017, the town's name was officially extended to "Oranienstadt Dillenburg" to reference Dillenburg's special connection to the House of Orange-Nassau as its ancestral seat.

=== Eibach ===
Eibach's history began in "Nassau times" in the 13th century. In 1313, the village had its first documentary mention. In the Second World War, it was left unscathed. In 2004, the healing spring was renovated, and a brineworks was built.

=== Manderbach ===
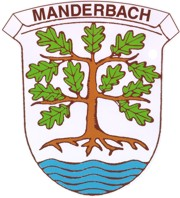
Manderbach's arms

Manderbach had its first documentary mention in 1225, making it older than the main town of Dillenburg (1254). The two former villages – nowadays parts of Dillenburg – Frohnhausen and Manderbach, had much in common in their early history. Here the two noble families von Hunsbach and von Selbach both held sway. As in Frohnhausen, there was also a great fire in Manderbach – albeit 148 years before Frohnhausen's – which, having been started by a lightning strike, burnt 38 houses down within an hour and a half on 29 April 1630.

=== Nanzenbach ===
The name Nanzenbach was mentioned for the first time in a document on 8 May 1325. This document mentions "die Nantzenbecher" — "the inhabitants of Nanzenbach".

=== Population development ===
(in each case on 31 December)

- 1998 - 25,053
- 1999 - 25,124
- 2000 - 25,092
- 2001 - 25,017
- 2002 - 24,923
- 2003 - 24,681
- 2004 - 24,533

== Coat of arms ==
The oldest town seals, dating from the 15th to 19th centuries, show the same composition as Dillenburg's current civic coat of arms. The arms were conferred officially in 1907 and confirmed in 1934. The lion inside the gateway is the Lion of Nassau.

== Culture and sightseeing ==
=== Museums ===
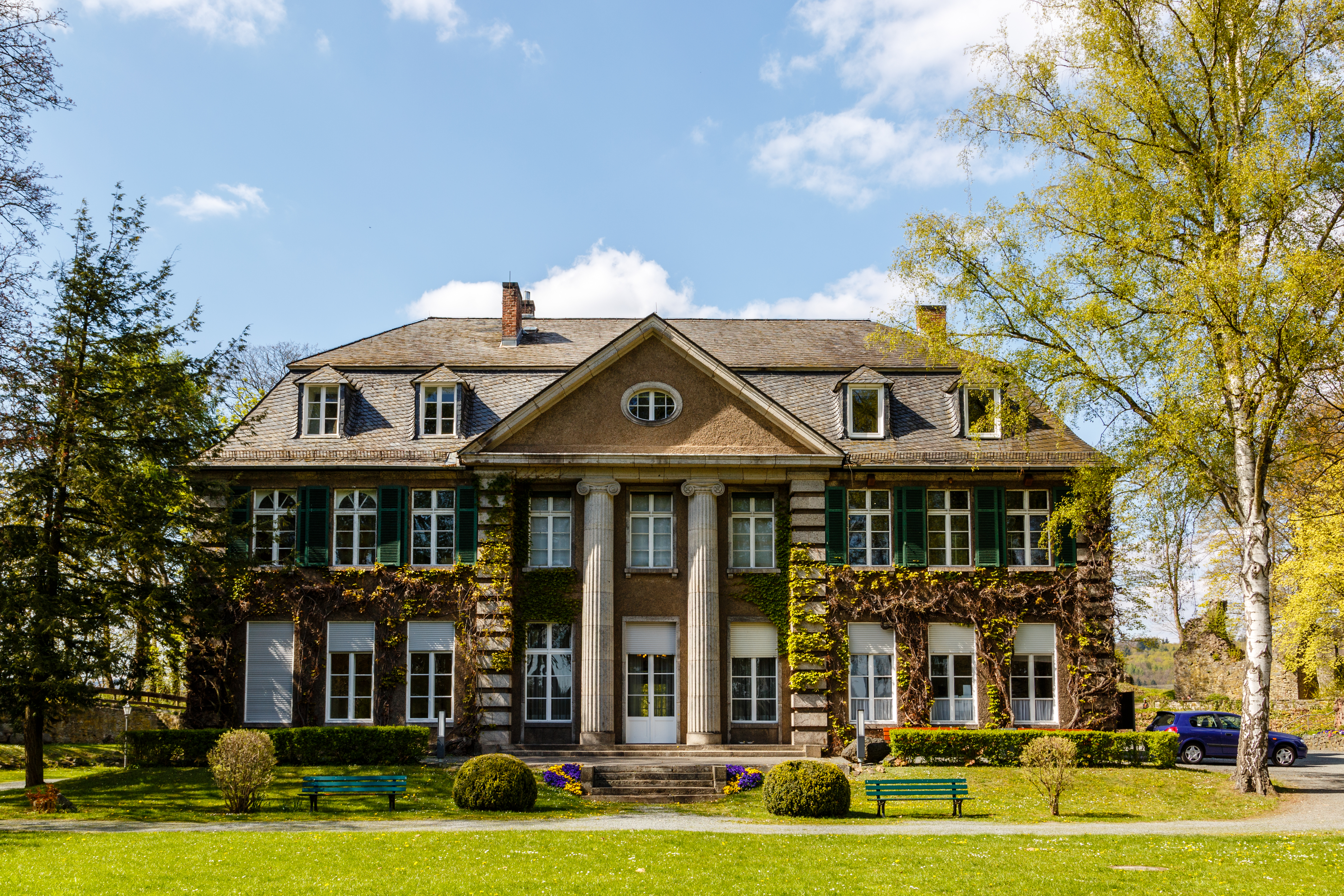
Dillenburg - "Villa Grün"

- Wilhelmsturm (tower) with the Orange-Nassau Museum
- "Villa Grün" museum of economic history
- The "Casemates", old defensive structures.
- Hessisches Landgestüt (≈ Hessian State Stud Farm) with coach museum in the Orangery. "Living Museum" about the horse.

=== Buildings ===
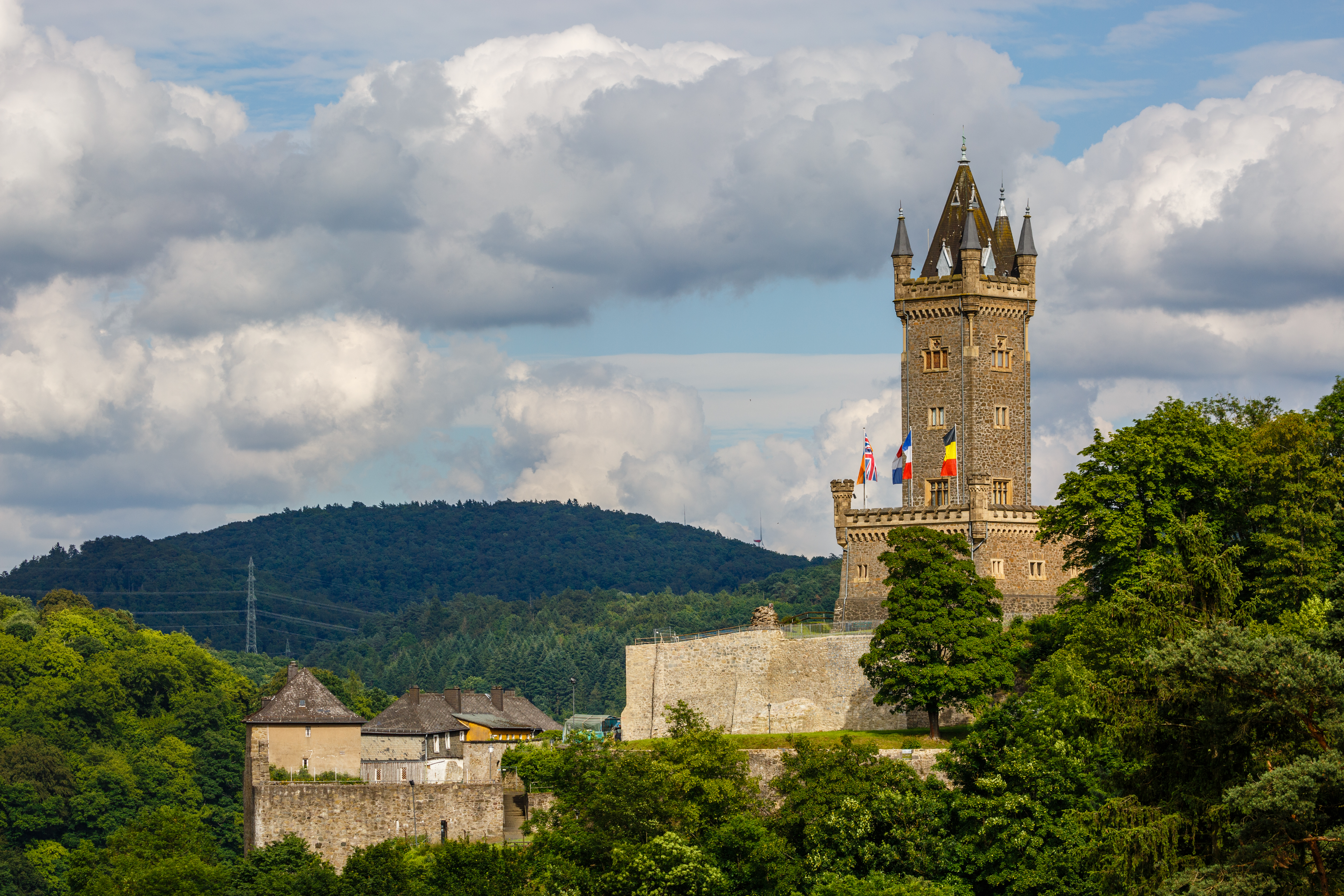
Dillenburg - Wilhelmsturm

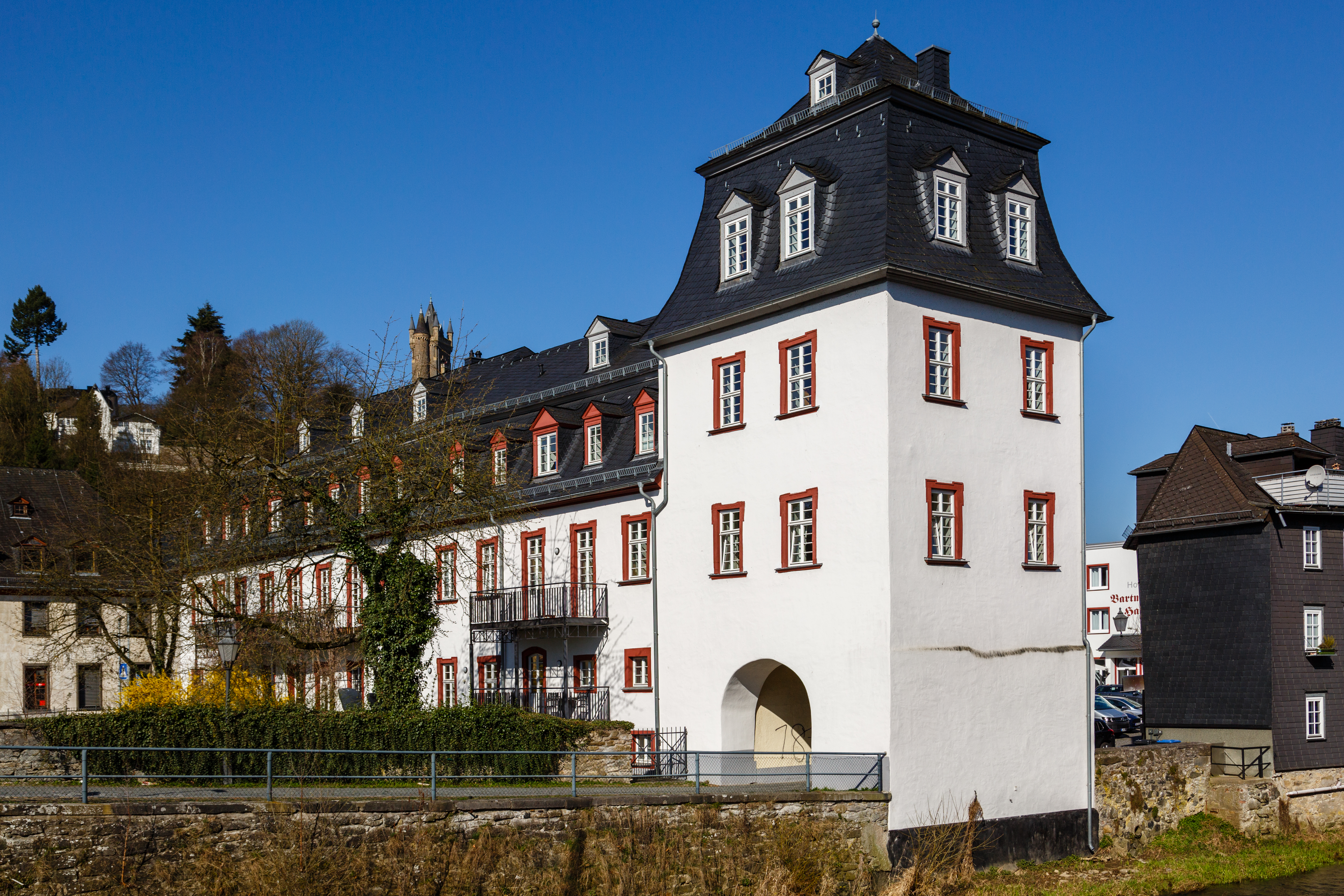
Dillenburg - The Untertor

Manderbach Church

- Wilhelmsturm (tower) built in 1872 - 1875
- The "Casemates", old defensive structures.from the 16th century
- The Evangelische Town Church from 1491
- The Dillturm (tower) from 1597
- The old rectory from 1531–1533
- The Untertor (Lower Gate) from 1344 (alterations in 1594 and 1737)
- Manderbach Church

=== Parks ===
In Donsbach is a wildlife park.

=== Hiking trails ===
The following trails go through or begin in Dillenburg:

- The Rothaarsteig from Dillenburg to Brilon
- The Schlösserweg from Dillenburg to Düsseldorf -Benrath
- The Dillweg from Haiger to Wetzlar
- The Uplandweg from Dillenburg to Salzkotten

=== Regular events ===
- Jazz-Weekend, in June
- Kirschenmarkt (cherry market), in June
- Aquarena-Nacht, in July
- Hubertus-Markt, in October
- Hengstparade des Hessischen Landgestüts (stallion parade)
- Maypole Festival in Eibach, at the beginning of May
- Rocknacht music festival in Eibach, in summer.

=== Other ===
- Brineworks and healing spring, Eibach

== Economy and infrastructure ==
=== Transport ===
The bypass on Federal Highway (Bundesstraße) B277 opened in April 2007. It is a tunnel under the Schlossberg, bypassing the historic Old Town with its timber-frame houses and it was one of Germany's biggest tunnel projects. As a result of the bankruptcy of the contractor for the works, Walter Bau, completion of the project was delayed by more than a year.

Dillenburg station is on the Dill line, part of the original Cologne-Gießen Railway. It runs from Gießen to Siegen and connects central Hesse with the Rhineland and the Ruhr. The Heller Valley Railway (RB96), runs from Betzdorf via Burbach to Dillenburg, RB95 from Siegen Hbf to Dillenburg. RB95 and RB96 are operated by Hessische Landesbahn (HLB), section DreiLänderBahn. The Dillenburg station was once a major freight terminal for iron mining in the Schelderwald.

=== Established businesses ===
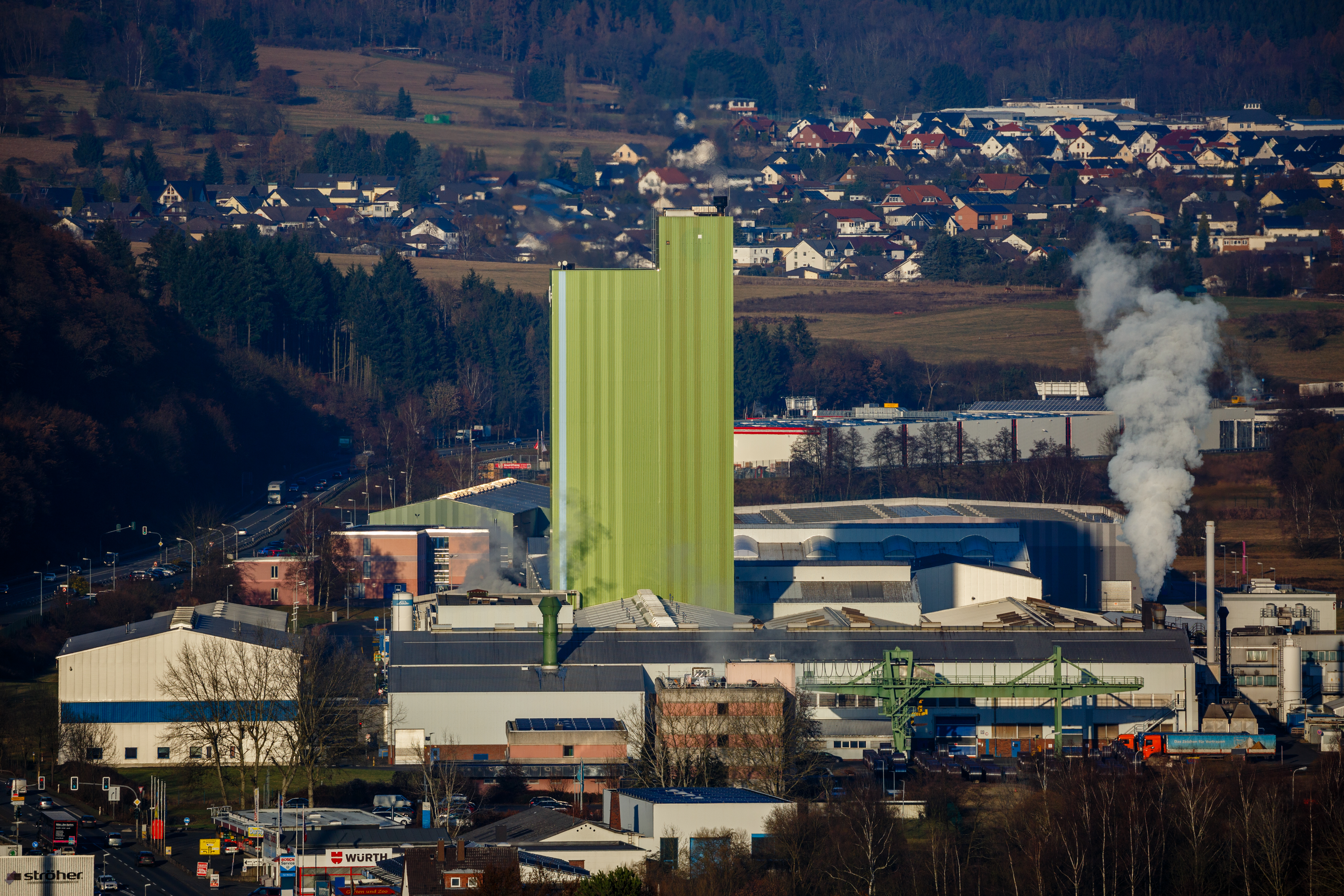
Outokumpu Nirosta (former Thyssen Krupp Nirosta) in the North of Dillenburg

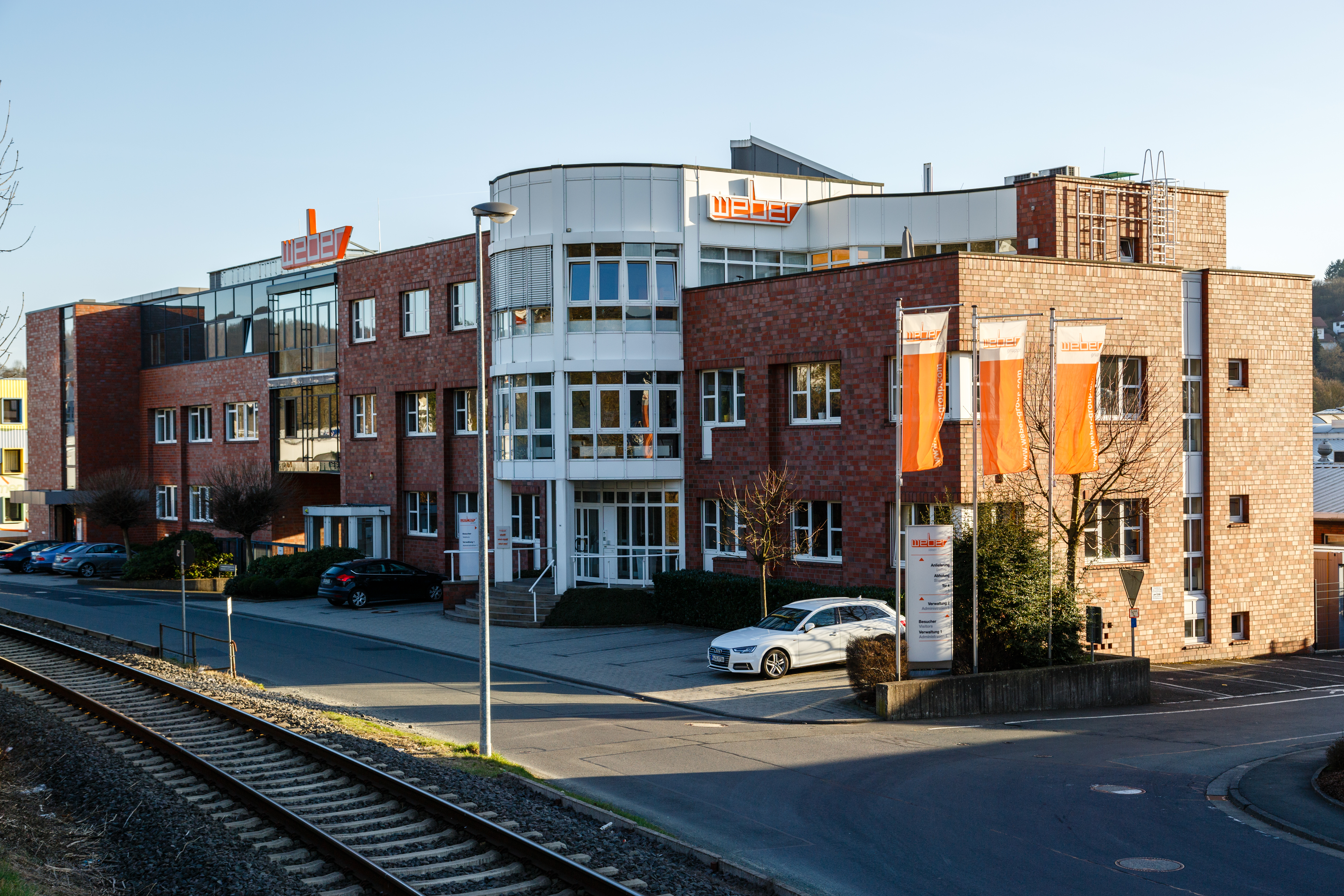
Weber Kunststofftechnik Dillenburg

- Deutsche Post AG
- E.ON Mitte (OT Oberscheld)
- Funkenerosionstechnik Hartwig Hermann
- INDEN Design
- Isabellenhütte Heusler GmbH & Co. KG
- Linde & Wiemann
- Ströher-Keramik
- Outokumpu Dillenburg Works
- TSR Recycling GmbH & Co. KG Dillenburg Branch
- Volksbank Dill eG
- Weber Kunststofftechnik

=== Media ===
- Dill-Post
- Dill-Zeitung

=== Public institutions ===
- Police station
- Fire brigade
- Dill-Kliniken (hospital)
- Deaconate
- German Red Cross Dillkreis chapter
- Lahn-Dill Youth Office
- Lahn-Dill Jugendbildungswerk
- Lebenshilfe for the mentally handicapped Kreisvereinigung für den ehem. Dillkreis e.V. (District association for the former Dill district)
- Lahn-Dill Social Office

=== Education ===
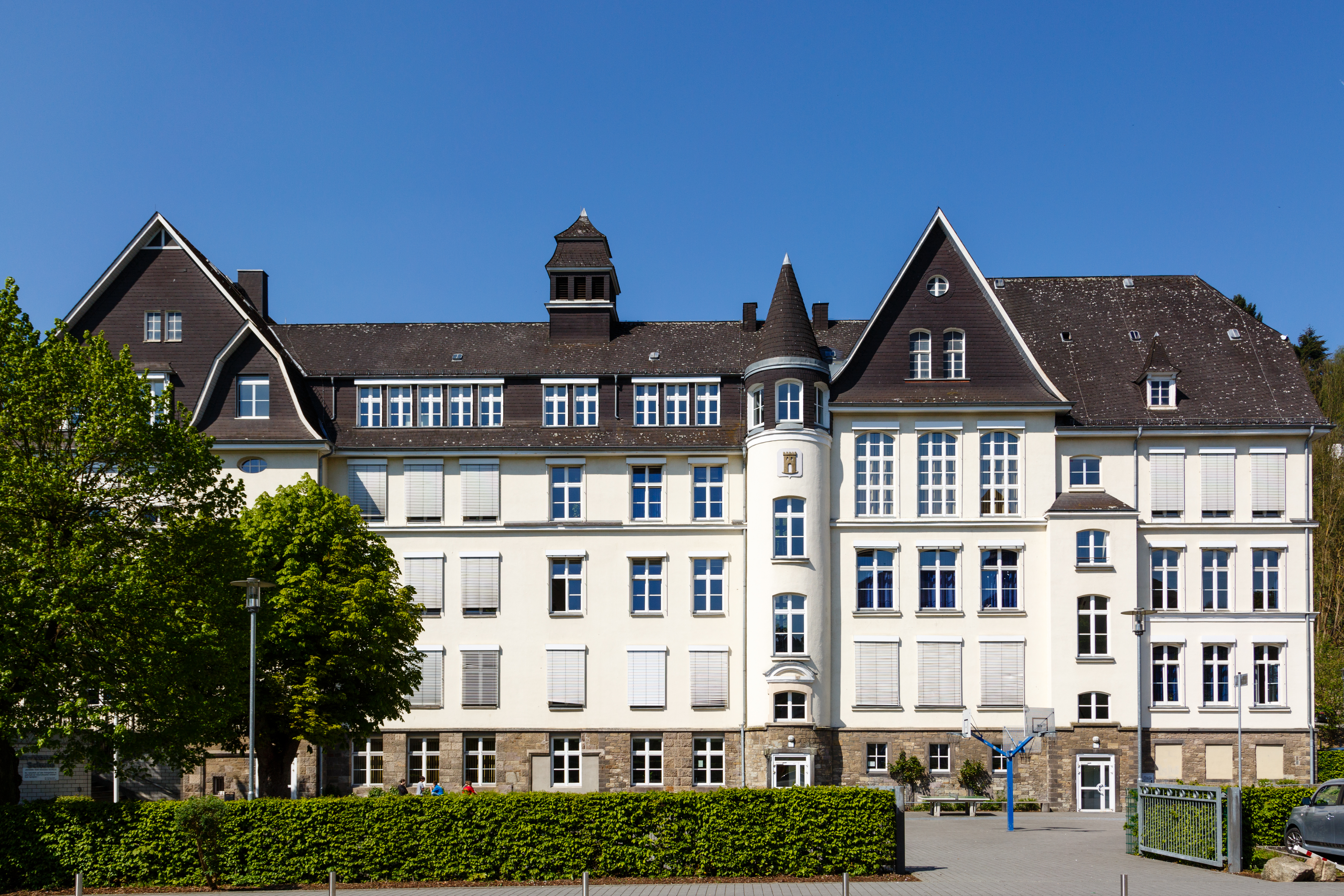
Dillenburg - Johann-von-Nassau-Schule

- Gewerbliche Schulen (vocational school)
- Goldbachschule (Haupt- and Realschule)
- Juliane-von-Stolberg-Schule (primary school)
- Johann-von-Nassau-Schule (Haupt- and Realschule)
- Kaufmännische Schulen (vocational school)
- Kindergartens (Evangelical, Catholic, municipal, Arbeiterwohlfahrt [German workers' welfare])
- Lahn-Dill-Akademie (Folk high school)
- Otfried-Preußler-Schule für Praktisch Bildbare (special school)
- Roteberg-Schule (primary school)
- Schelderwald-Schule (primary school and Hauptschule)
- Wilhelm-von-Oranien-Schule (Gymnasium)

== Twin towns – sister cities ==
Dillenburg is twinned with:

- Breda, Netherlands
- Diest, Belgium
- Hereford, England, United Kingdom
- Orange, France

== Notable people ==
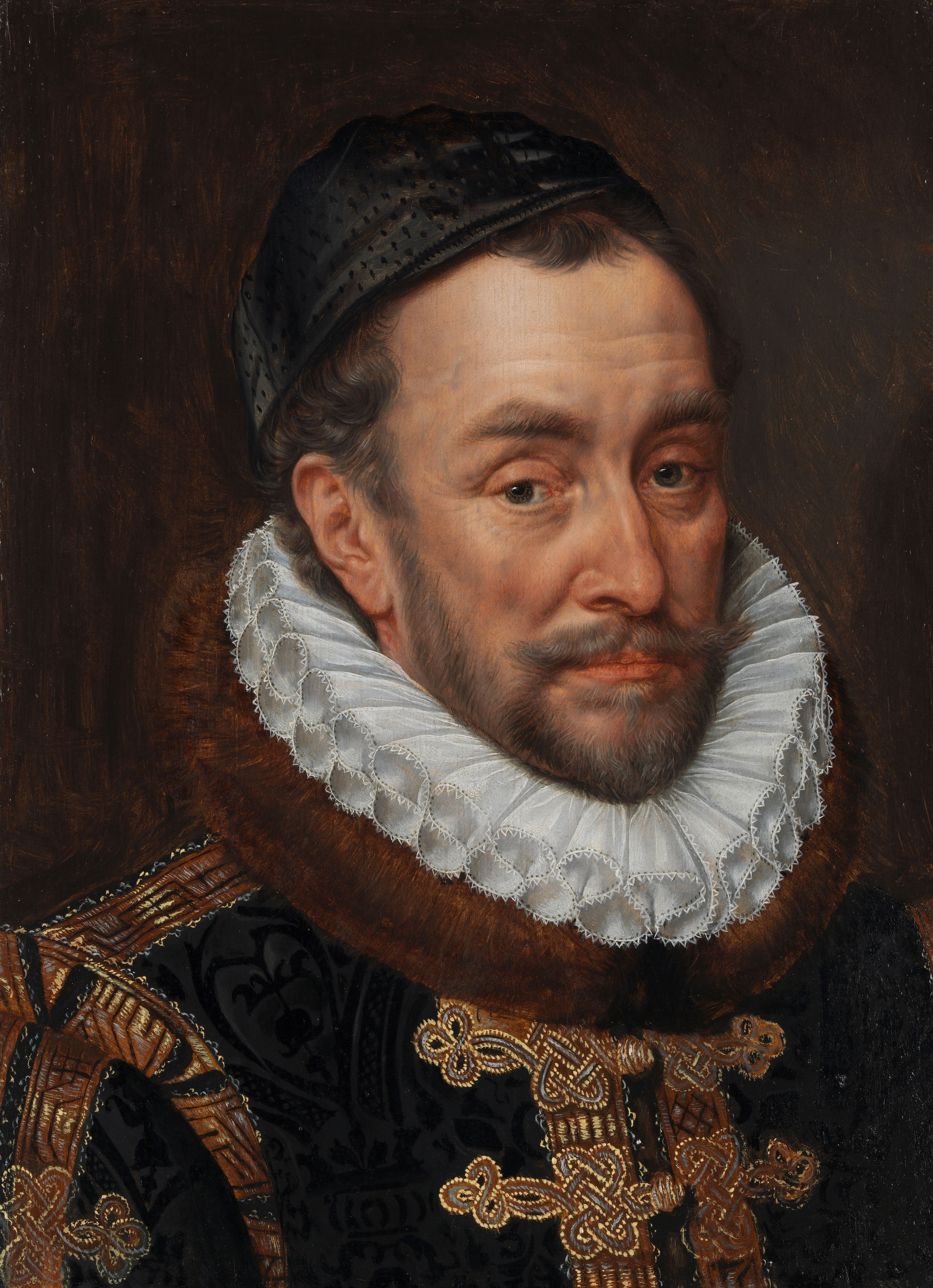
William the Silent, also known as William I of Orange-Nassau, by Adriaen Thomasz Key, c. 1580

- William I, Count of Nassau-Siegen (1487–1559) count from the House of Nassau, nicknamed the Rich
- William the Silent (1533–1584), leader in the Dutch war of independence against Spain.
- John VI, Count of Nassau-Dillenburg (1536–1606), aristocrat.
- Maurice, Prince of Orange (1567–1625), aristocrat.
- Ernest Casimir I, Count of Nassau-Dietz (1573–1632), ancestor of Kings of the Netherlands
- John Maurice, Prince of Nassau-Siegen (1604–1679), Dutch field marshal, called the Brazilian.
- Karl Christian Kehrer (1755-1833) portrait, landscape and history painter.
- John O. Meusebach (1812–1897), founder of Fredericksburg, Texas and Texas Senator
- Julius Eckhardt Raht (1826–1879), American mining engineer and entrepreneur
- Arnold Lequis (1861-1949) General of the Infantry (Germany) in WWI
- Fritz Angerstein (1891–1925), mass murderer
- Maria Kliegel, (born 1952), cellist
- Deborah Levi (born 1997) bobsledder, gold medallist in the 2022 Winter Olympics

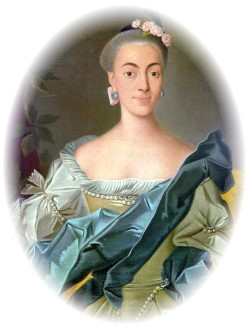
Catharina Helena Dörrien, 1761

=== Worked in Dillenburg ===
- Maximilian Mörlin (1516–1584), Evangelical theologian and reformer
- Catharina Helena Dörrien (1717–1795), worked in Dillenburg from 1746 and lived here until she died in 1795. Whilst resident, she produced a various publications, including a catalogue of the flora of Orange-Nassau, where she became the first woman to name a fungal taxon
- Georg Ludwig Hartig (1764–1837) worked from 1797 to 1805 as Inspector of Forests for the Prince of Orange-Nassau, in Dillenburg; at the same time led one of the earliest schools of forestry in Europe, also in Dillenburg
- Bruno Gröning (1906–1959), mystic and healer, had his practise in Dillenburg for a period and is buried there
