= Johann Christian Rosenmüller =

German anatomist (1771-1820)

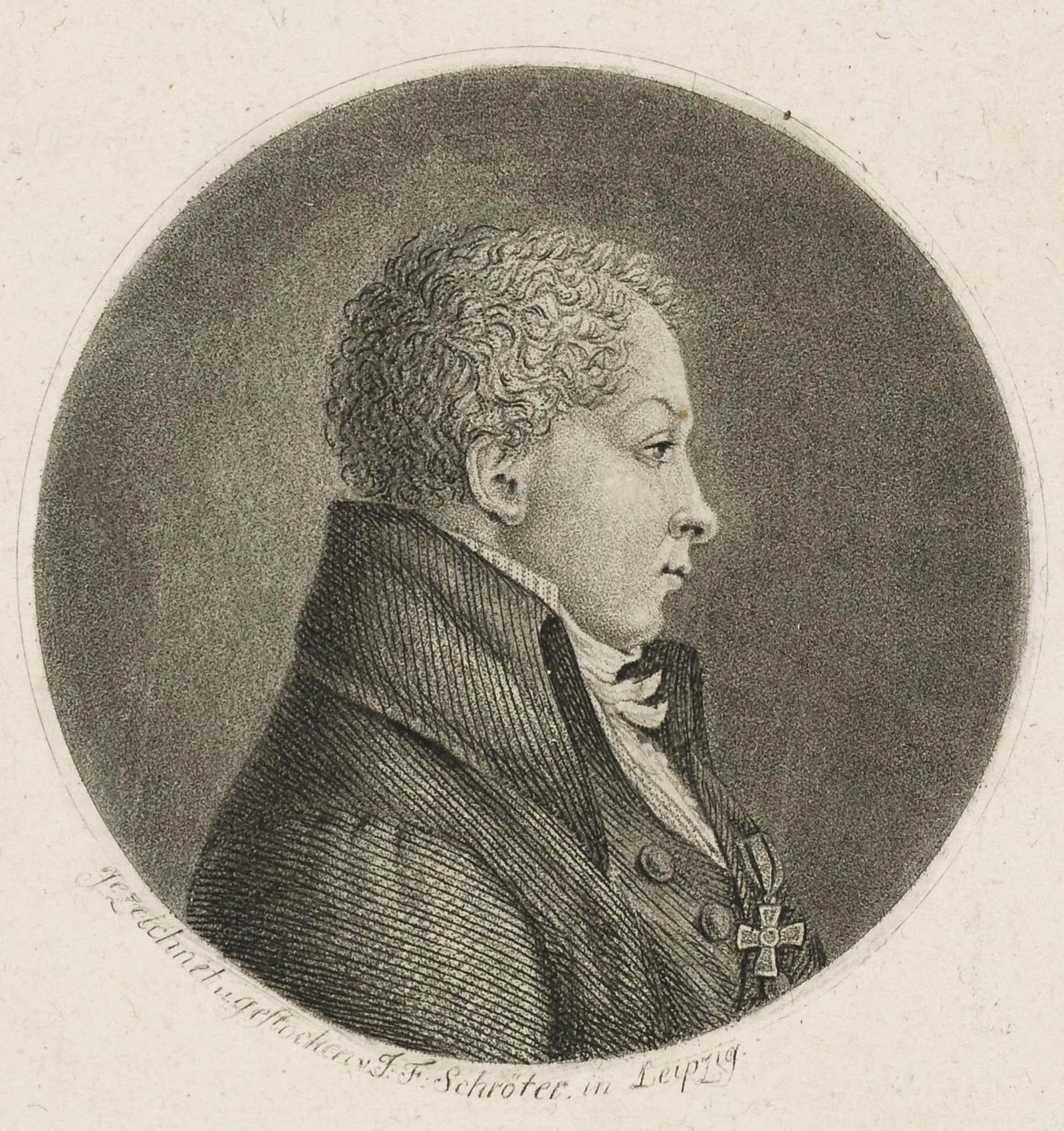
- Born: 25 May 1771; Hildburghausen, Saxe-Hildburghausen
- Died: 28 February 1820 (aged 48); Leipzig, Kingdom of Hanover
- Education: University of Leipzig; University of Erlangen
- Scientific career
- Fields: anatomy; surgery
- Workplaces: University of Leipzig
- Doctoral advisor: Johann Gottlob Haase
- Doctoral students: Ernst Heinrich Weber

Johann Christian Rosenmüller (25 May 1771 – 28 February 1820) was a German anatomist born near Hildburghausen, Thuringia. He was the son of theologian Johann Georg Rosenmüller (1736–1815).

He received his education at the Universities of Leipzig and Erlangen, and in 1794 was appointed prosector at the anatomical institute at Leipzig. In 1797 he earned his doctorate, and from 1802 until his death was a professor of anatomy and surgery at the University of Leipzig.

An avid speleologist, in 1794 he provided the binomial name of Ursus spelaeus for the extinct cave bear from his analysis of bones found near the village of Muggendorf. He was the author of several treatises on anatomy and surgery, and has the following anatomical terms named after him:

- Rosenmüller's fossa: The lateral nasopharyngeal recess.
- Rosenmüller's gland: The palpebral portion of the lacrimal gland.
- Rosenmüller's organ: Also known as the parovarium.

== Selected works ==
- "Quaedam de ossibus fossilibus animalis cujusdam, historiam ejus et cognitionem", 1794.
- Beiträge zur Geschichte und nähern Kenntniß fossiler Knochen, 1795 – Contributions to the history and knowledge of fossilized bone.
- Abbildungen und Beschreibungen merkwürdigen Hölen um Muggendorf, 1796 – Illustrations and descriptions involving the Muggendorf cave.
- "Organorum Lachrymalium Partiumque Externarum Oculi Humani Descriptio Anatomica", 1797.
- "Quaedam de ovariis embryonum et foetuum humanorum", 1802.
- "Compendium anatomicum, in usum praelectionum", 1816.
- Handbuch der Anatomie des menschlichen Körpers zum Gebrauche bei vorlesungen (with Ernst Heinrich Weber), 1840 – Manual on the anatomy of the human body, for usage in lectures.
