= Gustav Heyer (forester) =

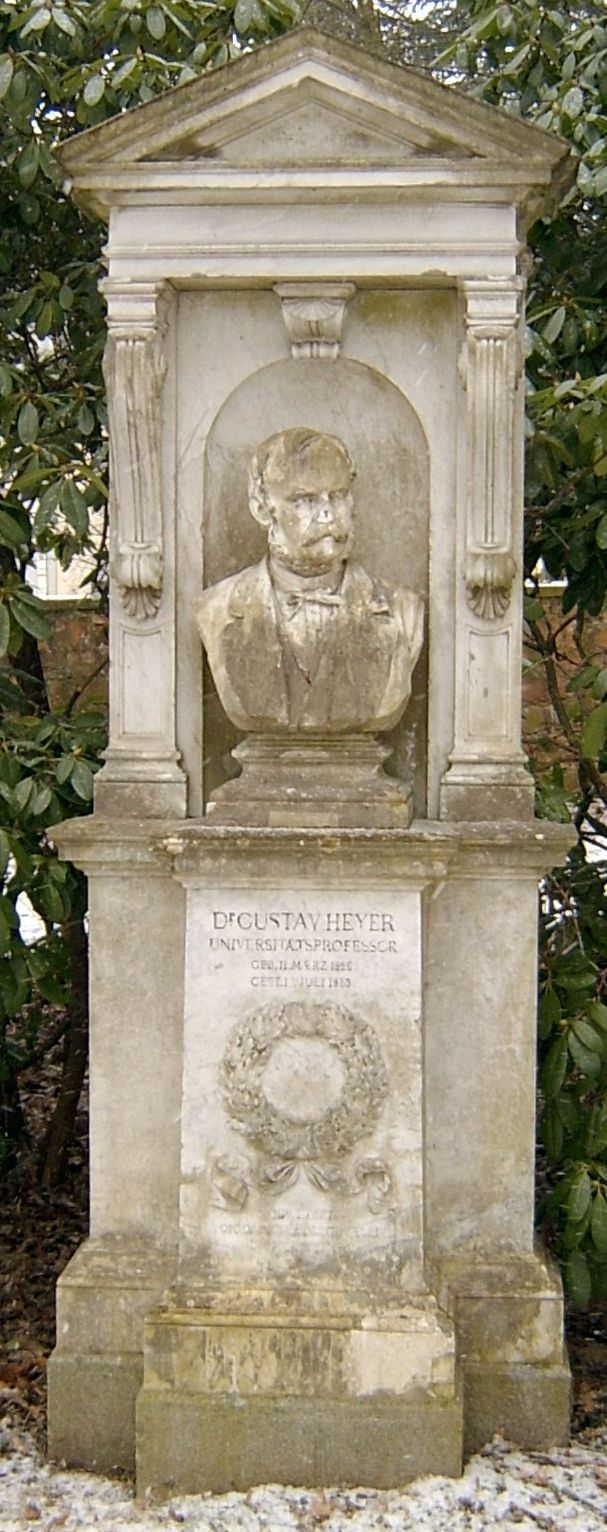
Grave of Heyer in Giessen

Friedrich Casimir Gustav Heyer (11 March 1826 – 10 July 1883) was a German forestry professor and son of Carl Heyer who was also a famous forester. He was a professor of forestry at the University of Giessen.

Gustav was the first son of Carl Justus Heyer and was born in Giessen where his father taught forestry. After school he went to study science under the guidance of his father. He graduated in 1847 with a D. Phil and worked briefly at Darmstadt. In 1849 he joined Giessen University to teach forest science. He became a full professor in 1857. He stayed on despite offers from the Polytechnic at Zurich. His principal contributions were in forest value estimation and statistics. He was also an expert on forest soil science.

He died in a fishing accident on 10 July 1883. His body was found only on the 14th of July at Emmering in the river Amper downstream of Bruck (near Munich).
