= Johann Georg Rosenmüller =

German Protestant theologian (1736–1815)

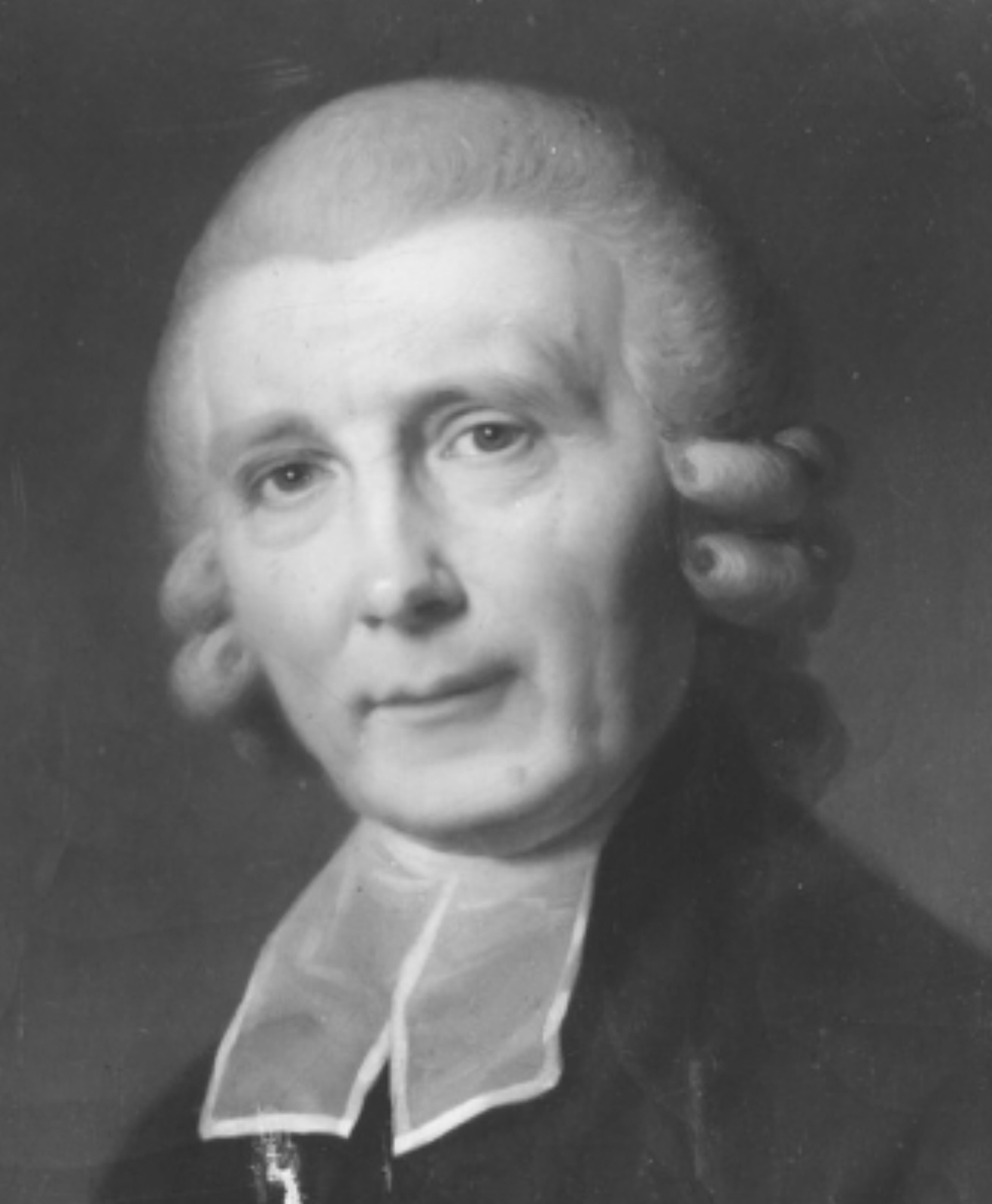
Johann Georg Rosenmüller

Johann Georg Rosenmüller (18 December 1736 – 14 March 1815), a German Protestant theologian, was born at Ummerstadt in Hildburghausen, on 18 December 1736. He was appointed Professor of Theology at Erlangen in 1773, Primarius Professor of Theology at Erlangen in 1773, Primarius Professor of Divinity at Giessen in 1783, and was called in 1785 to Leipzig, where he remained until his death in 1815. His two sons were Ernst Friedrich Karl Rosenmüller, and Johann Christian Rosenmüller.

== Writings ==
His chief writings are:

- Morgen-und Abendandachten
- Betrachtungen über die vornehmsten Warheiten der Religion auf alle Tage des Jahres
- Auserlesnes Beicht-und Communionbuch
- Predigten über auserlesene Stellen der Heiligen Schrift
- Beiträge zur Homiletik
- Scholia in Novum Testamentum
- Historia Interpretationis Librorum Sacrorum in Ecclesia Christiana
