= 1877 in Germany =

- Decades: 1850s; 1860s; 1870s; 1880s; 1890s
- See also: Other events of 1877; History of Germany • Timeline • Years

Events in the year 1877 in Germany.

== Incumbents ==
=== National level ===
- Emperor – William I
- Chancellor – Otto von Bismarck

=== State level ===
==== Kingdoms ====
- King of Bavaria – Ludwig II
- King of Prussia – William I
- King of Saxony – Albert
- King of Württemberg – Charles

==== Grand Duchies ====
- Grand Duke of Baden – Frederick I
- Grand Duke of Hesse – Louis III to 13 June, then Louis IV
- Grand Duke of Mecklenburg-Schwerin – Frederick Francis II
- Grand Duke of Mecklenburg-Strelitz – Frederick William
- Grand Duke of Oldenburg – Peter II
- Grand Duke of Saxe-Weimar-Eisenach – Charles Alexander

==== Principalities ====
- Schaumburg-Lippe – Adolf I, Prince of Schaumburg-Lippe
- Schwarzburg-Rudolstadt – George Albert, Prince of Schwarzburg-Rudolstadt
- Schwarzburg-Sondershausen – Gonthier Frederick Charles II, Prince of Schwarzburg-Sondershausen
- Principality of Lippe – Woldemar, Prince of Lippe
- Reuss Elder Line – Heinrich XXII, Prince Reuss of Greiz
- Reuss Younger Line – Heinrich XIV, Prince Reuss Younger Line
- Waldeck and Pyrmont – George Victor, Prince of Waldeck and Pyrmont

==== Duchies ====
- Duke of Anhalt – Frederick I, Duke of Anhalt
- Duke of Brunswick – William, Duke of Brunswick
- Duke of Saxe-Altenburg – Ernst I, Duke of Saxe-Altenburg
- Duke of Saxe-Coburg and Gotha – Ernst II, Duke of Saxe-Coburg and Gotha
- Duke of Saxe-Meiningen – Georg II, Duke of Saxe-Meiningen

== Events ==
- 10 January – German federal election, 1877
- Summer – Kissingen Dictation

=== Date unknown ===
- German company Blohm+Voss is founded.

== Births ==
- 22 January – Hjalmar Schacht, German economist, banker, centre-right politician, and co-founder in 1918 of the German Democratic Party. (died 1970)
- 7 February – Julius Curtius, German (died 1948)
- 8 February – Albert Vögler, German politician, industrialist and entrepreneur (died 1945)
- 19 February – Gabriele Münter, German painter (died 1962)
- 3 March – Alexander Baerwald, German architect (died 1930)
- 4 March – Fritz Graebner, German ethnologist (d. 1934)
- 6 March – Karl Platen, German actor (died 1952)
- 12 March – Wilhelm Frick, German politician (died 1946)
- 15 March – Fritz Lang, German painter (died 1961)
- 19 March – Franz Joseph Emil Fischer, German chemist (died 1947)
- 29 March – Alois Kayser, Alsatian-born missionary (died 1944 in Micronesia)
- 15 April – Georg Kolbe, German painter (died 1947)
- 23 April – Hans Winkler, German botanist (died 1945)
- 4 June – Heinrich Otto Wieland, German chemist, Nobel Prize in Chemistry laureate (died 1957)
- 2 July – Hermann Hesse, German writer (died 1962)
- 13 September – Wilhelm Filchner, German explorer (died 1957)
- 15 September – Wilhelm Adam, German general (died 1949)
- 1 November – Else Ury, German writer (died 1943)
- 23 November – Franz Bracht, German politician (died 1933)
- 4 December – Morris Alexander, South African politician (died 1946 in South Africa)
- 19 December – Princess Pauline of Württemberg (died 1965)

== Deaths ==
- 12 January – Wilhelm Hofmeister, German biologist and botanist (born 1824)
- 18 February - Ernst Ludwig von Gerlach, German politician (born 1795)
- 20 February - Marie Simon, German nurse (born 1824)
- 22 February - Eduard Gaertner, German painter (born 1801)
- 18 April – Franz Hanfstaengl, German photograph and painter (born 1804)
- 22 April - August Wilhelm Zumpt, German German classical scholar (born 1815)
- 11 May – Albrecht Gustav von Manstein, German general (born 1805)
- 25 May – Friedrich Thyssen, German banker and patriarch of the Thyssen family dynasty (born 1804)
- 13 June – Louis III, Grand Duke of Hesse, nobleman (born 1806)
- 13 July – Wilhelm Emmanuel von Ketteler, German bishop of Roman-Catholic Church (born 1811)
- 14 July - August von Bethmann-Hollweg, German politician (born 1795)
- 12 September – Julius Rietz, German conductor and composer (born 1812)
- 26 September – Hermann Grassmann (born 1809)
- 18 October – Johann Carl Fuhlrott, German anthropologist and paleoanthropologist (born 1803)
- 2 November – Friedrich Graf von Wrangel, German Generalfeldmarschall (born 1784)
- 26 November – Richard Lucae, German architect (born 1829)
- 18 December – Philipp Veit, German painter (born 1793)
