= 1884 in Germany =

- Decades: 1860s; 1870s; 1880s; 1890s; 1900s
- See also: Other events of 1884; History of Germany • Timeline • Years

Events in the year 1884 in Germany.

== Incumbents ==
=== National level ===
- Emperor – William I
- Chancellor – Otto von Bismarck

=== State level ===
==== Kingdoms ====
- King of Bavaria – Ludwig II
- King of Prussia – William I
- King of Saxony – Albert
- King of Württemberg – Charles

==== Grand Duchies ====
- Grand Duke of Baden – Frederick I
- Grand Duke of Hesse – Louis IV
- Grand Duke of Mecklenburg-Schwerin – Frederick Francis II
- Grand Duke of Mecklenburg-Strelitz – Frederick William
- Grand Duke of Oldenburg – Peter II
- Grand Duke of Saxe-Weimar-Eisenach – Charles Alexander

==== Principalities ====
- Schaumburg-Lippe – Adolf I, Prince of Schaumburg-Lippe
- Schwarzburg-Rudolstadt – George Albert, Prince of Schwarzburg-Rudolstadt
- Schwarzburg-Sondershausen – Charles Gonthier, Prince of Schwarzburg-Sondershausen
- Principality of Lippe – Woldemar, Prince of Lippe
- Reuss Elder Line – Heinrich XXII, Prince Reuss of Greiz
- Reuss Younger Line – Heinrich XIV, Prince Reuss Younger Line
- Waldeck and Pyrmont – George Victor, Prince of Waldeck and Pyrmont

==== Duchies ====
- Duke of Anhalt – Frederick I, Duke of Anhalt
- Duke of Brunswick – William, Duke of Brunswick to 18 October, then Duchy claimed by Prince Ernest Augustus, Duke of Cumberland, who was excluded and a temporary council of regency was established.
- Duke of Saxe-Altenburg – Ernst I, Duke of Saxe-Altenburg
- Duke of Saxe-Coburg and Gotha – Ernst II, Duke of Saxe-Coburg and Gotha
- Duke of Saxe-Meiningen – Georg II, Duke of Saxe-Meiningen

==== Colonial Governors ====
- Cameroon (Kamerun) from 14 July – Gustav Nachtigal (commissioner) to 19 July, then Maximilian Buchner (acting commissioner)
- German South-West Africa (Deutsch-Südwestafrika) from 24 April – Adolf Lüderitz (magistrate) to 7 October, then Gustav Nachtigal (commissioner)
- Togoland from 5 July – Gustav Nachtigal (commissioner) to 6 July October, then Heinrich Randad (provisional consul)

== Events ==
- 24 April – Territory in South West Africa is placed under German protection, becoming the first German colonial possession.
- 9 June – The construction of the Reichstag building in Berlin started.
- 5 July – German protectorate is first declared over part of Togoland.
- 14 July – Commencement of German administration in Cameroon (Kamerun).
- 28 October – German federal election, 1884
- 15 November – The Berlin Conference which regulates European colonisation and trade in Africa begins (ends 26 February 1885).

=== Date unknown ===
- German company Glastechnisches Laboratorium Schott & Genossen was founded, later becoming Schott AG

==== Science ====
- Germany got the second part of world's oldest national social health insurance system by legislation of Otto von Bismarck's social legislation, which included the Accicential Insurance Bill of 1884.
- Koch's postulates are four criteria designed to establish a causative relationship between a microbe and a disease. The postulates were formulated by Robert Koch and Friedrich Loeffler in 1884.
- Paal-Knorr Synthesis was initially reported independently by German chemists Carl Paal and Ludwig Knorr as a method for the preparation of furans
- Robert Koch resided and researched at Grant Medical College in Bombay, India, where he was able to determine the causative agent of cholera, isolating Vibrio cholerae.

== Births ==
- 31 January – Theodor Heuss, German politician, publicist and former Chancellor of Germany (died 1963)
- 12 February – Max Beckmann, German painter and graphic artist (died 1950)
- 26 March – Wilhelm Backhaus, German pianist (died 1969)
- 12 April – Otto Fritz Meyerhof, German physician and biochemist, Nobel Prize in Physiology or Medicine laureate (died 1951)
- 14 May – Claudius Dornier, German aircraft designer (died 1969)
- 5 June – Doris 'Dodo' Große, German artists' model, lover of Ernst Ludwig Kirchner (year of death unknown)
- 10 June – Walther Schreiber, German politician (died 1958)
- 14 June – Georg Zacharias, German swimmer (died 1953)
- 14 June – Hans Müller-Schlösser, German playwright (died 1956)
- 23 June – Werner Krauss, German actor (died 1959
- 24 June – Prince Heinrich of Bavaria, member of the Bavarian Royal House of Wittelsbach and a highly decorated Army officer in the First World War (died 1916)
- 2 July – Alfons Maria Jakob, German neuropathologist (died 1931)
- 7 July – Lion Feuchtwanger, German novelist and playwright (died 1958)
- 14 July – Prince Adalbert of Prussia, German nobleman (died 1948)
- 17 July – Walter von Keudell, German politician (died 1973)
- 23 July – Emil Jannings, German actor (died 1950)
- 31 July – Carl Friedrich Goerdeler, German politician (died 1944)
- 20 August – Rudolf Bultmann, German Lutheran theologian and professor of New Testament at the University of Marburg (died 1976)
- 28 August – Christian Stock, German politician (died 1967)
- 24 September – Hugo Schmeisser, German weapons designer (died 1953)
- 29 September – Wilhelm Bendow, German actor (died 1950)
- 8 October – Walther von Reichenau, German field marshal (died 1942)
- 10 October – Friedrich von Rabenau, German general and theologian (died 1945)
- 11 October – Friedrich Bergius, German chemist, Nobel Prize laureate (died 1949)
- 21 October – Claire Waldoff, German singer (died 1957)
- 24 October – Arno Bieberstein, German swimmer (died 1918)
- 1 December – Karl Schmidt-Rottluff, German painter (died 1976)
- 2 December – Johannes Popitz, German politician (died 1945)
- 14 December – Erich Ponto, German actor (died 1957)

== Deaths ==
- 17 January – Hermann Schlegel, German ornithologist and herpetologist (born 1804)
- 20 January - Julius Pintsch, German tinsmith, inventor and entrepreneur (born 1815
- 25 January – Johann Gottfried Piefke, German conductor and composer (born 1815)
- 28 January – Ernst Friedrich Wilhelm Klinkerfues, German astronomer (born 1827)
- 13 March - Siegfried Heinrich Aronhold, German mathematician (born 1819)
- 6 April – Emanuel Geibel, German poet and playwright (born 1815)
- 19 June – Adrian Ludwig Richter, German painter (born 1803)
- 10 July – Karl Richard Lepsius, German archaeologist and linguist (born 1810)
- 1 August – Heinrich Laube, German poet (born 1806)
- 21 August - Ottilie Assing, German feminist, freethinker, and abolitionist (born 1819)
- 2 September – Karl Eberhard Herwarth von Bittenfeld, German field marshal (born 1796)
- 18 October – William, Duke of Brunswick, German nobleman (born 1806)
- 29 October - Albert Dulk, German writer (born 1819)
- 25 November – Adolph Wilhelm Hermann Kolbe, German chemist (born 1818)
- 10 December – Eduard Rüppell, German explorer (born 1794)
