= 1809 in Germany =

- Decades: 1800s; 1810s; 1820s
- See also: Other events of 1809; History of Germany • Timeline • Years

Events from the year 1809 in Germany.

== Incumbents ==
=== Kingdoms ===
- Kingdom of Prussia
  - Monarch – Frederick William III (16 November 1797 – 7 June 1840)
- Kingdom of Bavaria
  - Maximilian I (1 January 1806 – 13 October 1825)
- Kingdom of Saxony
  - Frederick Augustus I (20 December 1806 – 5 May 1827)
- Kingdom of Württemberg
  - Frederick I (22 December 1797 – 30 October 1816)

=== Grand Duchies ===
- Grand Duke of Baden
  - Charles Frederick (25 July 1806 – 10 June 1811)
- Grand Duke of Hesse
  - Louis I (14 August 1806 – 6 April 1830)
- Grand Duke of Mecklenburg-Schwerin
  - Frederick Francis I– (24 April 1785 – 1 February 1837)
- Grand Duke of Mecklenburg-Strelitz
  - Charles II (2 June 1794 – 6 November 1816)
- Grand Duke of Oldenburg
  - Wilhelm (6 July 1785 –2 July 1823 ) Due to mental illness, Wilhelm was duke in name only, with his cousin Peter, Prince-Bishop of Lübeck, acting as regent throughout his entire reign.
  - Peter I (2 July 1823 - 21 May 1829)
- Grand Duke of Saxe-Weimar
  - Karl August (1758–1809) Raised to grand duchy in 1809

=== Principalities ===
- Schaumburg-Lippe
  - George William (13 February 1787 - 1860)
- Schwarzburg-Rudolstadt
  - Friedrich Günther (28 April 1807 - 28 June 1867)
- Schwarzburg-Sondershausen
  - Günther Friedrich Karl I (14 October 1794 - 19 August 1835)
- Principality of Lippe
  - Leopold II (5 November 1802 - 1 January 1851)
- Principality of Reuss-Greiz
  - Heinrich XIII (28 June 1800-29 January 1817)
- Waldeck and Pyrmont
  - Friedrich Karl August (29 August 1763 – 24 September 1812)

=== Duchies ===
- Duke of Anhalt-Dessau
  - Leopold III (16 December 1751 – 9 August 1817)
- Duke of Brunswick
  - Frederick William (16 October 1806 – 16 June 1815)
- Duke of Saxe-Altenburg
  - Duke of Saxe-Hildburghausen (1780–1826) - Frederick
- Duke of Saxe-Coburg and Gotha
  - Ernest I (9 December 1806 – 12 November 1826)
- Duke of Saxe-Meiningen
  - Bernhard II (24 December 1803–20 September 1866)
- Duke of Schleswig-Holstein-Sonderburg-Beck
  - Frederick Charles Louis (24 February 1775 – 25 March 1816)

== Events ==
- 9 April – Tiroleans rise, under the command of Andreas Hofer, against French and Bavarian occupation.
- 14 April – Battle of Abensberg, Bavaria: Napoleon defeats Austria.
- 19 April – War of the Fifth Coalition –
  - Battle of Raszyn: The armies of the Austrian Empire are defeated by the Duchy of Warsaw.
  - Battle of Teugen-Hausen: The armies of the Austrian Empire are defeated by the French and their Bavarian allies.
- 21 April – Battle of Landshut
- 21/22 April – Battle of Eckmühl
- 23 April – Battle of Ratisbon
- 24 April – Battle of Neumarkt-Sankt Veit
- 8 July – Battle of Gefrees
- 29/30 July – Battle of Halberstadt
- 1 August – Battle of Ölper
- Black Brunswickers established
- Corps Hannovera Göttingen established
- Saxe-Weimar-Eisenach formed from a merger and raised to a grand duchy

== Births ==
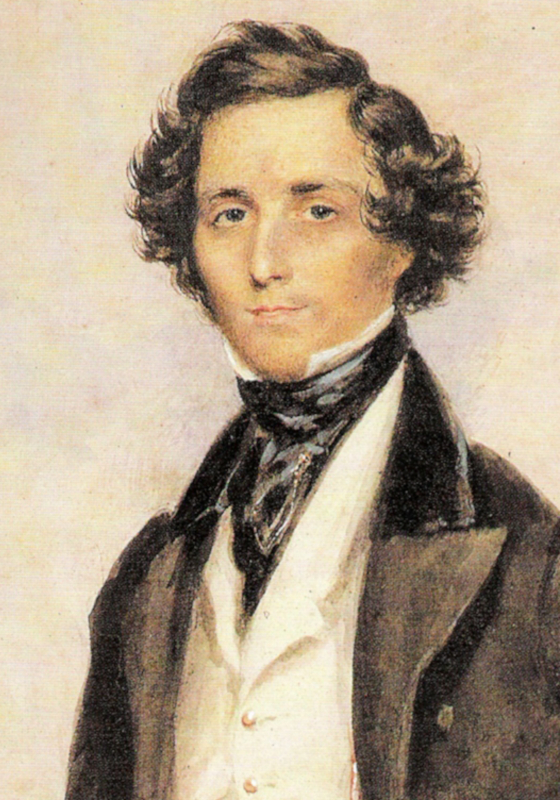
Felix Mendelssohn

- 3 February – Felix Mendelssohn, German composer (d. 1847)
- 24 February – Edwin Freiherr von Manteuffel, Prussian field marshal (d. 1885)
- 21 February – Carl Ernst Bock, German physician and anatomist (d. 1874).
- 15 April – Hermann Grassmann, Prussian mathematician (d. 1877)
- 5 May – Frederick Langenheim, German American pioneer of panoramic photography (died 1879
- 23 May – Hugo von Kirchbach, Prussian general (d. 1887)
- 13 June – Heinrich Hoffmann, German author and children's poet (d. 1894)
- 20 June – Isaak August Dorner, German theologian (d. 1884)
- 16 July – Konstantin Bernhard von Voigts-Rhetz, Prussian general (d. 1877)
- 8 August – Heinrich Abeken, German theologian (d. 1872)
- 12 September – Julius von Bose, Prussian general (d. 1894)
- 10 November – David Einhorn (rabbi), German-American abolitionist (d. 12879)
- 20 November – Gustav Koerner, German-born revolutionary, journalist, lawyer, politician, a statesman of Illinois and Germany, Colonel of the U.S. Army (d. 1896)
- 30 December – Wilhelm von Tümpling, Prussian general (d. 1884)

== Deaths ==
- 6 January – Johann Augustus Eberhard, German theologian, philosopher (b. 1739)
- 18 March – Karoline Kaulla, German banker (b. 1739)
- 26 April – Bernhard Schott, German music publisher (b. 1748)
- 1 September – Johann Friedrich August Göttling, German chemist (b. 1753)
- 7 September – Caroline Schelling, German scholar (b. 1763)
- 28 November – Jakob Heinrich Laspeyres, German lepidopterist (b. 1769)
