= 1885 in Germany =

- Decades: 1860s; 1870s; 1880s; 1890s; 1900s
- See also: Other events of 1885; History of Germany • Timeline • Years

Events in the year 1885 in Germany.

== Incumbents ==
=== National level ===
- Emperor – William I
- Chancellor – Otto von Bismarck

=== State level ===
==== Kingdoms ====
- King of Bavaria – Ludwig II
- King of Prussia – William I
- King of Saxony – Albert
- King of Württemberg – Charles

==== Grand Duchies ====
- Grand Duke of Baden – Frederick I
- Grand Duke of Hesse – Louis IV
- Grand Duke of Mecklenburg-Schwerin – Frederick Francis II
- Grand Duke of Mecklenburg-Strelitz – Frederick William
- Grand Duke of Oldenburg – Peter II
- Grand Duke of Saxe-Weimar-Eisenach – Charles Alexander

==== Principalities ====
- Schaumburg-Lippe – Adolf I, Prince of Schaumburg-Lippe
- Schwarzburg-Rudolstadt – George Albert, Prince of Schwarzburg-Rudolstadt
- Schwarzburg-Sondershausen – Charles Gonthier, Prince of Schwarzburg-Sondershausen
- Principality of Lippe – Woldemar, Prince of Lippe
- Reuss Elder Line – Heinrich XXII, Prince Reuss of Greiz
- Reuss Younger Line – Heinrich XIV, Prince Reuss Younger Line
- Waldeck and Pyrmont – George Victor, Prince of Waldeck and Pyrmont

==== Duchies ====
- Duke of Anhalt – Frederick I, Duke of Anhalt
- Duke of Brunswick – Prince Albert of Prussia (regent, appointed in 1885)
- Duke of Saxe-Altenburg – Ernst I, Duke of Saxe-Altenburg
- Duke of Saxe-Coburg and Gotha – Ernst II, Duke of Saxe-Coburg and Gotha
- Duke of Saxe-Meiningen – Georg II, Duke of Saxe-Meiningen

==== Colonial Governors ====
- Cameroon (Kamerun) – Maximilian Buchner (acting commissioner) to 1 April, then Eduard von Knorr (acting commissioner) to 4 July, then Julius Freiherr von Soden (governor) (1st term)
- German East Africa (Deutsch-Ostafrika) from 27 May – Karl Peters (administrator)
- German New Guinea (Deutsch-Neuguinea) – Gustav von Oertzen (commissioner, appointed in 1885)
- German South-West Africa (Deutsch-Südwestafrika) – Gustav Nachtigal (commissioner) to May 1885, then Heinrich Ernst Göring (acting commissioner)
- Togoland – Heinrich Randad (provisional consul) to 26 June, then Ernst Falkenthal (commissioner)
- Wituland (Deutsch-Witu) from 8 April – Gustav Denhardt (resident)

== Events ==
- 17 February – German government grants an imperial charter to Carl Peters for establishment of a protectorate in East Africa.
- 26 February – The final act of the Berlin Conference regulates European colonization and trade in Africa.
- 26 March – Prussian deportations: the Prussian government orders the expulsion of all ethnic Poles and Jews holding Russian citizenship, later extended to include Polish Austrian citizens. More than 30,000 people are forced across the border.
- 3 April – Gottlieb Daimler is granted a German patent for his 1-cylinder water-cooled engine design.
- 8 April – The sultan of Witu cedes 25 square miles of territory to German brothers Clemens and Gustav Denhardt, which becomes the first German territory in Wituland.
- 27 May – The remainder of the Wituland becomes the German Protectorate of Wituland (Deutsch-Witu).

=== Undated ===
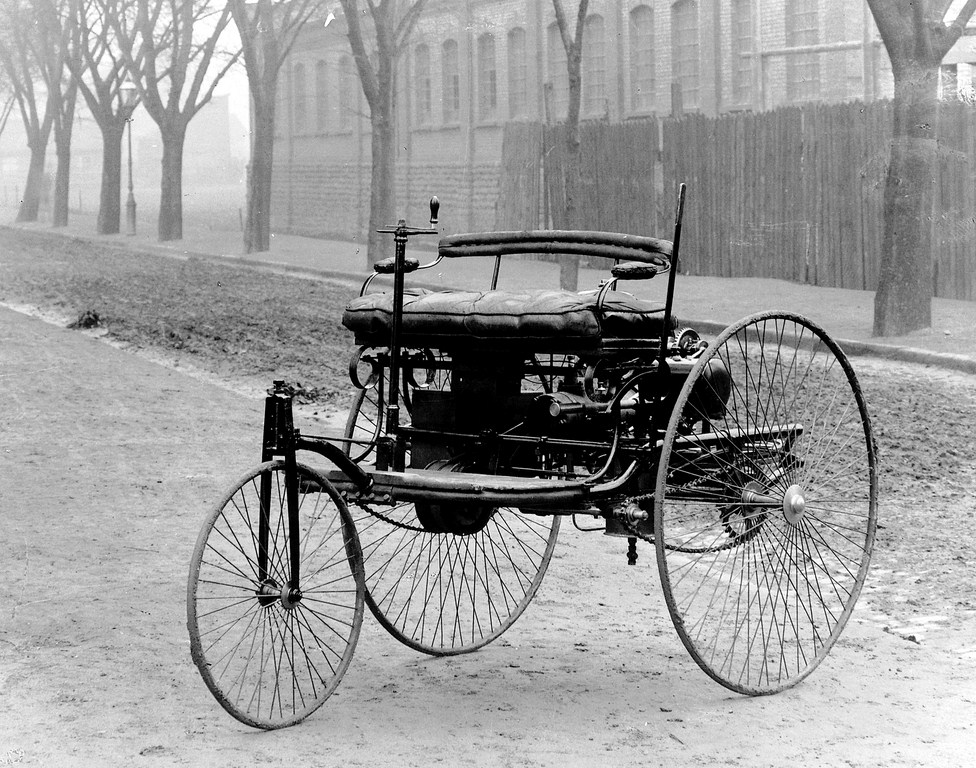
The Benz Patent Motorwagen was built in 1885

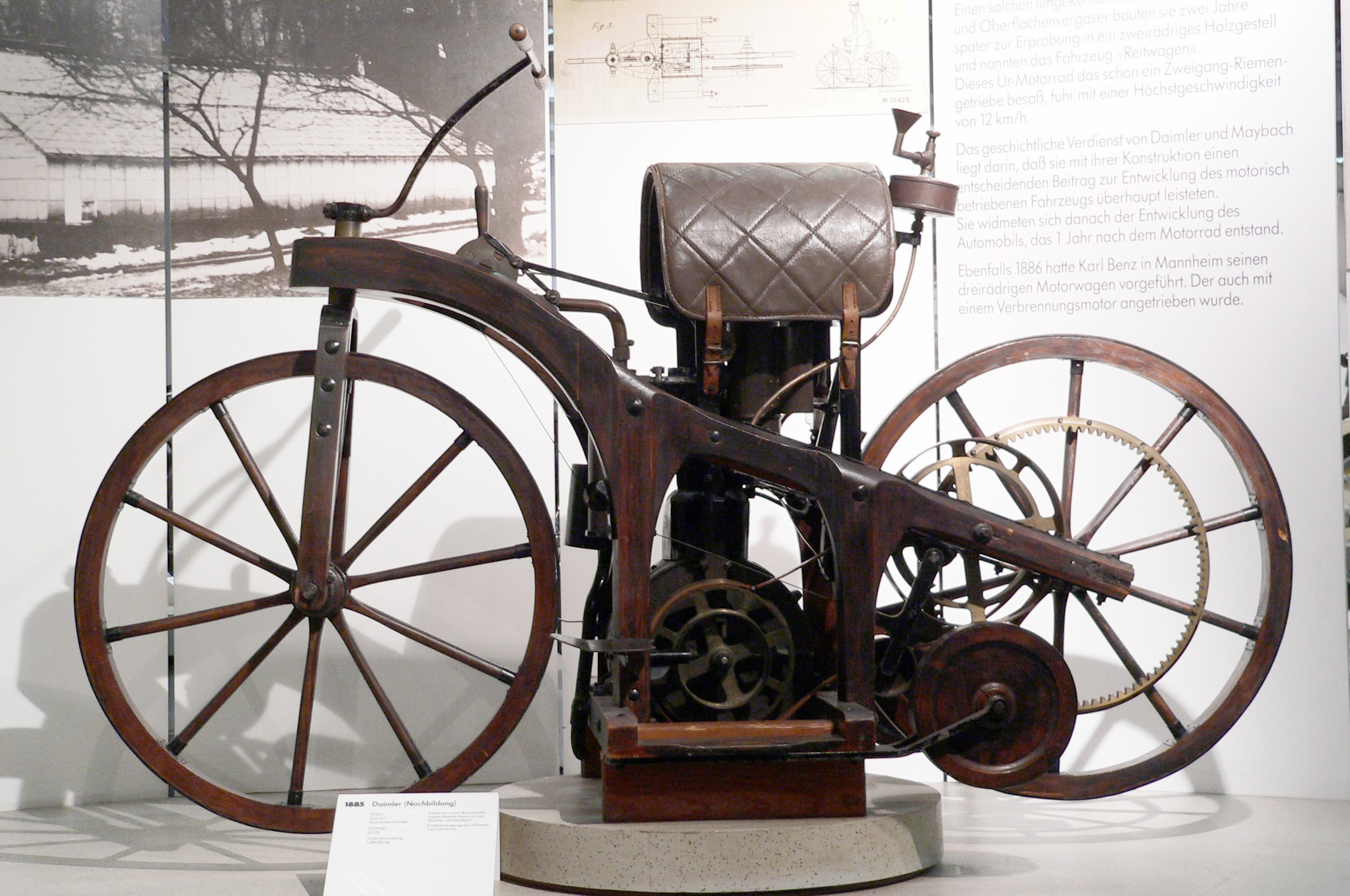
The Reitwagen (riding car), the first internal combustion motorcycle (1885)

- Karl Benz produces the Benz Patent-Motorwagen, regarded as the first automobile (patented and publicly launched the following year).
- Gottlieb Daimler and Wilhelm Maybach produce the Daimler Reitwagen, regarded as the first motorcycle.

== Births ==
- 2 January – Anna Hübler, German pair skater (died 1976)
- 17 January – Nikolaus von Falkenhorst, German general (died 1968)
- 27 January – Eduard Künneke, German composer (died 1953)
- 1 February – Friedrich Kellner, German diarist (died 1970)
- 7 February – Hugo Sperrle, German field marshal of Luftwaffe (died 1953)
- 11 March – Hans Leibelt, German film actor (died 1974)
- 7 April – Walther Schwieger, German U-boat commander of U-20, which sank the Lusitania (died 1917)
- 12 April – Hermann Hoth, German general (died 1971)
- 18 April – Claus Bergen, German painter (died 1964)
- 14 May – Otto Klemperer, German conductor (died 1973)
- 21 May – Sophie of Schönburg-Waldenburg, German-born Albanian noblewoman (died 1936)
- 2 June – Hans Gerhard Creutzfeldt, German neuropathologist (died 1964)
- 9 June – Carl Hoffmann, German film director (died 1947)
- 30 June – Heinrich Schomburgk, German tennis player (died 1965)
- 6 July – Ernst Busch, German field marshal (died 1945)
- 8 July – Ernst Bloch, German philosopher (died 1977)
- 8 July
  - Hugo Boss, German fashion designer (died 1948)
  - Paul Leni, German film director (died 1929)
- 24 July – Paul von Hase, German soldier (died 1944)
- 9 August – Hans Lachmann-Mosse, German publisher (died 1944)
- 7 September
  - Eleonore Baur, German Nazi, only woman to participate in Munich Beer Hall Putsch (died 1981)
  - Franz Eichhorst, German painter (died 1948)
- 9 September – Paul Henckels, German actor (died 1967)
- 14 September – Carl de Vogt, German actor (died 1970)
- 19 September – Ernst Reicher, German actor (died 1936)
- 1 November – Anton Flettner, German aviation engineer and inventor (died 1961)
- 8 November – Emil Fahrenkamp, German architect (died 1966)
- 9 November – Julius Ebbinghaus, German philosopher (died 1981)
- 24 November – Rudolf Klein-Rogge, German actor (died 1955)
- 26 November – Heinrich Brüning, German politician and former Chancellor of Germany (died 1970)
- 30 November – Albert Kesselring, German Generalfeldmarshal of Luftwaffe (died 1960)
- 17 December – Theodor Steltzer, German politician (died 1967)
- 25 December
  - Albert Betz, German physicist and a pioneer of wind turbine technology (died 1968)
  - Angela Zigahl, German teacher and politician (died 1955)

|}

== Deaths ==
- 12 January – Prince August of Württemberg, German nobleman and general in Army of Kingdom Württemberg (born 1813)
- 22 February – Carl Scheppig, German architect (born 1803)
- 21 March – Franz Abt, German composer and choral conductor (born 1819)
- 6 April – Eduard Vogel von Falckenstein, Prussian general (born 1797)
- 7 April – Karl Theodor Ernst von Siebold, German physiologist and zoologist (born 1804)
- 2 June – Karl Anton, Prince of Hohenzollern, head of the Princely House of Hohenzollern-Sigmaringen, Hohenzollern from 1869 and Prime Minister of Prussia (born 1811)
- 15 June – Prince Friedrich Karl of Prussia, Prussian nobleman (born 1828)
- 16 June – Wilhelm Camphausen, German painter (born 1818)
- 17 June – Edwin Freiherr von Manteuffel, German field marshal (born 1809)
- 24 August – Eduard Riedel, German architect (born 1813)
- 17 September – Gustav Becker, German clockmaker (born 1819)
- 23 September – Carl Spitzweg, German painter (born 1808)
- 17 November – Gustav Seyffarth, German egyptologist (born 1796)
- 6 December – Robert Gerwig, German civil engineer and politician (born 1820)
- 9 December – Hermann Heinrich Becker, German politician (born 1820)
