= 1945 in Germany =

- Decades: 1920s; 1930s; 1940s; 1950s; 1960s
- See also: Other events of 1945; History of Germany • Timeline • Years

The following is a list of events from the year 1945 in Germany.

Many events took place in 1945, including the change of the geographical map of Germany.

== Incumbents ==
=== Pre-surrender ===
Head of State:

- Adolf Hitler (the Führer) (Nazi Party) until 30 April, then Karl Dönitz (President) (Nazi Party) to 23 May, then none

Chancellor

- Adolf Hitler (Nazi Party) until 30 April, then Joseph Goebbels (Nazi Party) until 1 May, then from 2 May Lutz Graf Schwerin von Krosigk (leading minister) (non-partisan conservative) to 23 May, then none

=== Post-surrender ===
- Marshal Georgy Zhukov (Red Army), General of the Army Dwight D. Eisenhower (United States Army), Field Marshal Bernard Montgomery (British Army), and Army General Jean de Lattre de Tassigny (French Army), commanders of the Allied Control Council

== Events ==
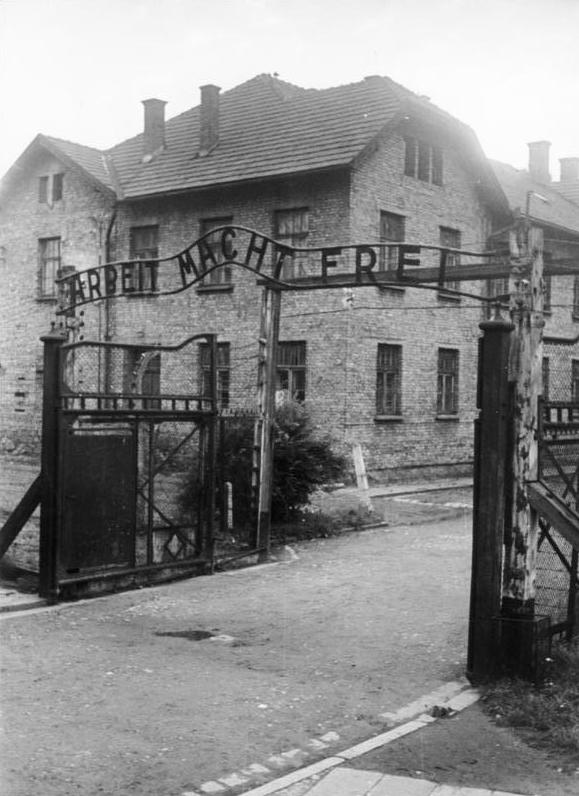
27 January: The Soviet Union liberates Auschwitz

=== January ===
- January – American troops cross the Siegfried Line into Belgium.
- 6 January – More than 80,000 Jews held captive by the Nazis are freed in Budapest, Hungary, by Russian soldiers.
- 12 January – World War II: The Soviet Union begins the Vistula-Oder Offensive in Eastern Europe against the Nazis.
- 14 January – Eastern Germany is invaded by Russian troops.
- 18 January – 66,000 Jewish prisoners are evacuated from Auschwitz by the Nazis.
- 20 January – World War II: The Soviet Union occupies Warsaw.
- 20 January – The Holocaust: The evacuation of Auschwitz concentration camp begins.
- 27 January – The Holocaust: The Red Army liberates the Auschwitz and Birkenau death camps.
- 30 January – The Wilhelm Gustloff, with over 10,000 mainly civilian Germans from Gotenhafen (Gdynia) in the Gdansk Bay, is sunk by three torpedoes from the Soviet submarine S-13 in the Baltic Sea; up to 9,400 are thought to have died – the greatest loss of life in a single ship sinking in war action in history.

=== February ===
- 3 February – World War II: The largest-ever USAAF daylight bombing raid on Berlin is carried out by one thousand bombers and nearly 600 escort fighters of the Eighth Air Force .
- 8 February – World War II: A combined British and Canadian front, consisting of 50,000 soldiers with 500 tanks and 1,034 guns, enters Reichswald, southeast of Nijmegen.
- 9 February – World War II: "Black Friday": A force of Allied Bristol Beaufighter aircraft suffers heavy casualties in an unsuccessful attack on German destroyer Z33 and escorting vessels sheltering in Førde Fjord, Norway.
- 10 February – World War II: The SS General von Steuben is sunk by the Soviet submarine S-13.
- 12 February – World War II: The British/Canadian front captures Cleves, in western Germany.
- 13 February
  - World War II: Soviet forces capture Budapest from the Nazis.
  - World War II: Royal Air Force and United States Army Air Forces begin bombing of Dresden, Germany. Over the next three days, more than 3,900 tons of high-explosive bombs and incendiary devices are dropped on the city. The resulting firestorm destroys fifteen square miles (39 square kilometres) of the city center. Between 22,000 and 25,000 people are killed in a controversial attack.
- 14 February – World War II: The British/Canadian front reaches the Rhine.
- 21 February – The last V-2-rocket is launched from Peenemünde.

=== March ===
- March – Anne Frank, dies in the Bergen-Belsen concentration camp, located in Lower Saxony, Germany, due to typhus. Her sister, Margot, had died not long before.
- 2 March – The Bachem Ba 349 Natter is launched from Stetten am kalten Markt. The Natter is the first manned rocket, developed as anti-aircraft weapon. The launch fails and the pilot dies.
- 3 March
  - World War II: A possible experimental atomic test blast occurs at the Nazis' Ohrdruf military testing area.
  - World War II: Units of the Canadian First Army capture Xanten.
- 7 March – World War II: American troops seize the bridge over the Rhine River at Remagen, Germany and begin to cross.
- 19 March – World War II: Adolf Hitler orders that all industries, military installations, machine shops, transportation facilities and communications facilities in Germany be destroyed.
- 24 March – World War II: Operation Varsity: Two airborne divisions capture bridges across the Rhine River to aid the Allied advance.
- 28 March — Holocaust: The Nazi propaganda film The Fuehrer Gives a Village to the Jews is completed.

=== April ===
- 4 April – World War II: American troops liberate their first Nazi concentration camp, Ohrdruf death camp in Germany.
- 6 April – World War II: Sarajevo is liberated from Nazi Germany and the Independent State of Croatia by the Yugoslav Partisans.
- 7 April – World War II: The only flight of the German ramming unit known as the Sonderkommando Elbe takes place, resulting in the loss of some 24 B-17s and B-24s of the United States Eighth Air Force.
- 10 April – World War II: The Allied Forces liberate the Nazi concentration camp, Buchenwald.
- 15 April – The Bergen-Belsen concentration camp is liberated by British forces.
- 22 April – Heinrich Himmler, through Count Bernadotte, puts forth an offer of German surrender to the Western Allies, but not the Soviet Union.
- 23 April – Russian troops reach Berlin.
- 24 April – Retreating German troops destroy all the bridges over the Adige in Verona, including the historical Ponte di Castelvecchio and Ponte Pietra.
- 25 April – World War II: Elbe Day: United States and Soviet troops link up at the Elbe River, cutting Germany in two.
- 26 April – Battle of Bautzen (World War II): The last "successful" German panzer-offensive in Bautzen ends with the city recaptured.
- 27 April – The Western Allies flatly reject any offer of surrender by Germany other than unconditional on all fronts.
- 29 April – Adolf Hitler marries his longtime mistress Eva Braun in a closed civil ceremony in the Berlin Führerbunker, on the same day that American forces liberate Dachau.
- 30 April – Hitler and Braun commit suicide as the Red Army approaches the Führerbunker in Berlin. Karl Dönitz succeeds Hitler as President of Germany; Joseph Goebbels succeeds Hitler as Chancellor of Germany. On the same day, some 33,000 Jews are freed from concentration camps by American troops.

=== May ===
- 1 May
  - World War II: Hamburg Radio announces that Hitler has died in battle, "fighting up to his last breath against Bolshevism."
  - Joseph Goebbels and his wife commit suicide after killing their six children. Karl Dönitz appoints Count Lutz Graf Schwerin von Krosigk as the new Chancellor of Germany.
  - Field Marshal Gerd von Rundstedt is captured by US troops
  - Mass suicide in Demmin after Soviet troops capture the town and commit atrocities (murders, mass rapes, etc.) on the civilians in retaliation for the killing of some Soviet soldiers there. More than 700 German civilians hang, poison, cut, or drown themselves and loved ones in a panic.
- 2 May – World War II: The Soviet Union announces the fall of Berlin. Soviet soldiers hoist the Red flag over the Reich Chancellery.
- 3 May
  - World War II: The prison ships Cap Arcona, Thielbek and Deutschland are sunk by the RAF in Lübeck Bay.
  - Rocket scientist Wernher von Braun and 120 members of his team surrender to U.S. forces (later going on to help start the U.S. space program).
  - German Protestant theologian Gerhard Kittel is arrested by the French forces in Tübingen, Germany.
- 4 May
  - World War II: The concentration camp Neuengamme near Hamburg is liberated by the British Army.
  - World War II: The North German army surrenders to Marshal Bernard Montgomery.
  - World War II: Holland is liberated by British and Canadian troops. German forces officially surrender one day later.
- 5 May
  - World War II: Denmark is liberated. German forces officially surrender one day later.
  - World War II: Prague rises up against the Nazis.
  - World War II: The US 11th Armored Division liberates the prisoners of Mauthausen concentration camp, including Simon Wiesenthal.
  - World War II: Canadian soldiers liberate the city of Amsterdam from Nazi occupation.
  - World War II: Admiral Karl Dönitz orders all U-boats to cease offensive operations and return to their bases.
- 7 May – World War II: General Alfred Jodl signs unconditional surrender terms at Reims, France, ending Germany's participation in the war. The document takes effect the next day.
- 8 May – World War II: V-E Day (Victory in Europe, as Nazi Germany surrenders) commemorates the end of World War II in Europe, with the final surrender being to the Soviets in Berlin, attended by representatives of the Western Powers.
- 9 May
  - World War II: Hermann Göring is captured by the United States Army.
  - World War II: General Alexander Löhr, Commander of German Army Group E near Topolšica, Slovenia, signs the capitulation of German occupation troops.
  - World War II: The German occupation of the Channel Islands ends with the liberation by British troops.
- 16 May – World War II: Alderney camps, an annex of the concentration camp Neuengamme, is liberated.
- 23 May
  - President of Germany Karl Dönitz and Chancellor of Germany Count Lutz Graf Schwerin von Krosigk are arrested by British forces at Flensburg. They are respectively the last German Head of state and Head of government until 1949.
  - Heinrich Himmler, former head of the Nazi SS, commits suicide in British custody.
- 24 May – Field marshal Robert Ritter von Greim commander of the Luftwaffe in the last days of the Third Reich, commits suicide.
- 29 May – German communists, led by Walther Ulbricht, arrive in Berlin.

=== June ===
- 5 June – The Allied Control Council, military occupation governing body of Germany, formally takes power.

=== July ===
- 1 July – World War II: Germany is divided between the Allied occupation forces.
- 16 July – A train collision near Munich kills 102 war prisoners.

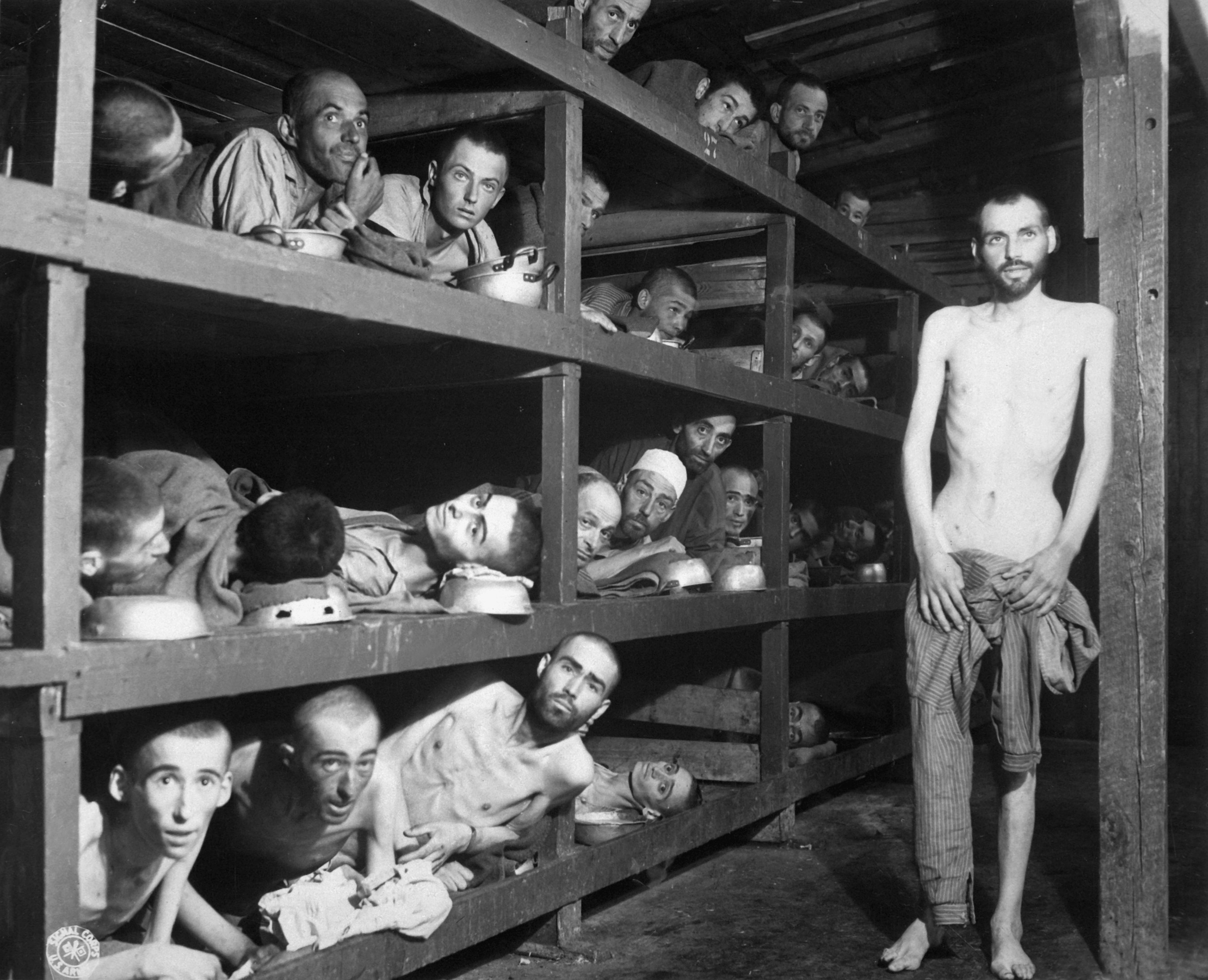
18 October: Nuremberg trials begin, after Buchenwald closed.

- 17 July – The Potsdam Conference started.

=== September ===
- 18 September – Stuttgarter Zeitung is first published.
- 27 September – Der Tagesspiegel is first published.

=== October ===
- 6 October – German newspaper Süddeutsche Zeitung was founded.

=== November ===
- 16 November – Cold War: The United States controversially imports 88 German scientists to help in the production of rocket technology.
- 20 November – The Nuremberg Trials begin: Trials against 24 Nazi war criminals of World War II start at the Nuremberg Palace of Justice.

=== December ===
- 23 December – German broadcaster Radio Bremen starts.
- 30 December – Hitler's will is found, confirming his intention of committing suicide.

== Births ==
- 1 January – Rüdiger Safranski, German philosopher and author
- 11 January – Christine Kaufmann, German actress (died 2017)
- 19 January – Maria Jepsen, German bishop of Hamburg in the North Elbian Evangelical Lutheran Church
- 21 January
  - Peter Konwitschny, German opera and theatre director
  - Kristian Schultze, German musician (died 2011)
- 2 February – Robert Atzorn, German actor
- 12 February – Thilo Sarrazin, German politician
- 21 February – Walter Momper, German politician
- 22 February – Antje-Katrin Kühnemann, German doctor and television presenter
- 23 February – Georg Milbradt, German politician
- 8 March – Anselm Kiefer, German painter
- 9 March – Katja Ebstein, German singer
- 22 March – Paul Schockemöhle, German equestrian
- 27 March – Harry Rowohlt, German writer and translator (died 2015)
- 2 April – Jürgen Drews, German singer
- 7 April – Werner Schroeter, German film director (died 2010)
- 11 April – Christian Quadflieg, German actor and television director (died 2023)
- 14 April – Eva Wagner-Pasquier, German opera manager
- 26 April – Winfried Glatzeder, German actor
- 1 May – Peter Kiesewetter, German composer (died 2012)
- 5 May – Dagmar Karin Sørbøe, Norwegian physiotherapist and women's rights activist
- 9 May – Jupp Heynckes, German football player and football trainer
- 17 May – Renate Krößner, German actress
- 21 May – Ernst Messerschmid, German physicist and astronaut
- 24 May – Baerbel Bohley, German opposition figure & artist (died 2010)
- 31 May – Rainer Werner Fassbinder, German film director (died 1982)
- 9 June – Nike Wagner, German dramaturge, arts administrator and author
- 14 June – Jörg Immendorff, German painter (died 2007)
- 22 June – Rainer Brüderle, German politician
- 6 July – Horst Metz, German politician (died 2022)
- 15 July – Jürgen Möllemann, German politician (died 2003)
- 14 August – Wim Wenders, German film director and producer
- 30 August – Siegfried Lorenz, German baritone (died 2024)
- 9 September – Robert Alexy, German jurist and legal philosopher (died 2026)
- 11 September – Franz Beckenbauer, German footballer and coach (died 2024)
- 30 September – Ralph Siegel. German record producer and songwriter
- 3 November – Gerd Müller, German footballer (died 2021)
- 2 December – Lisa Kreuzer, German actress

== Deaths ==
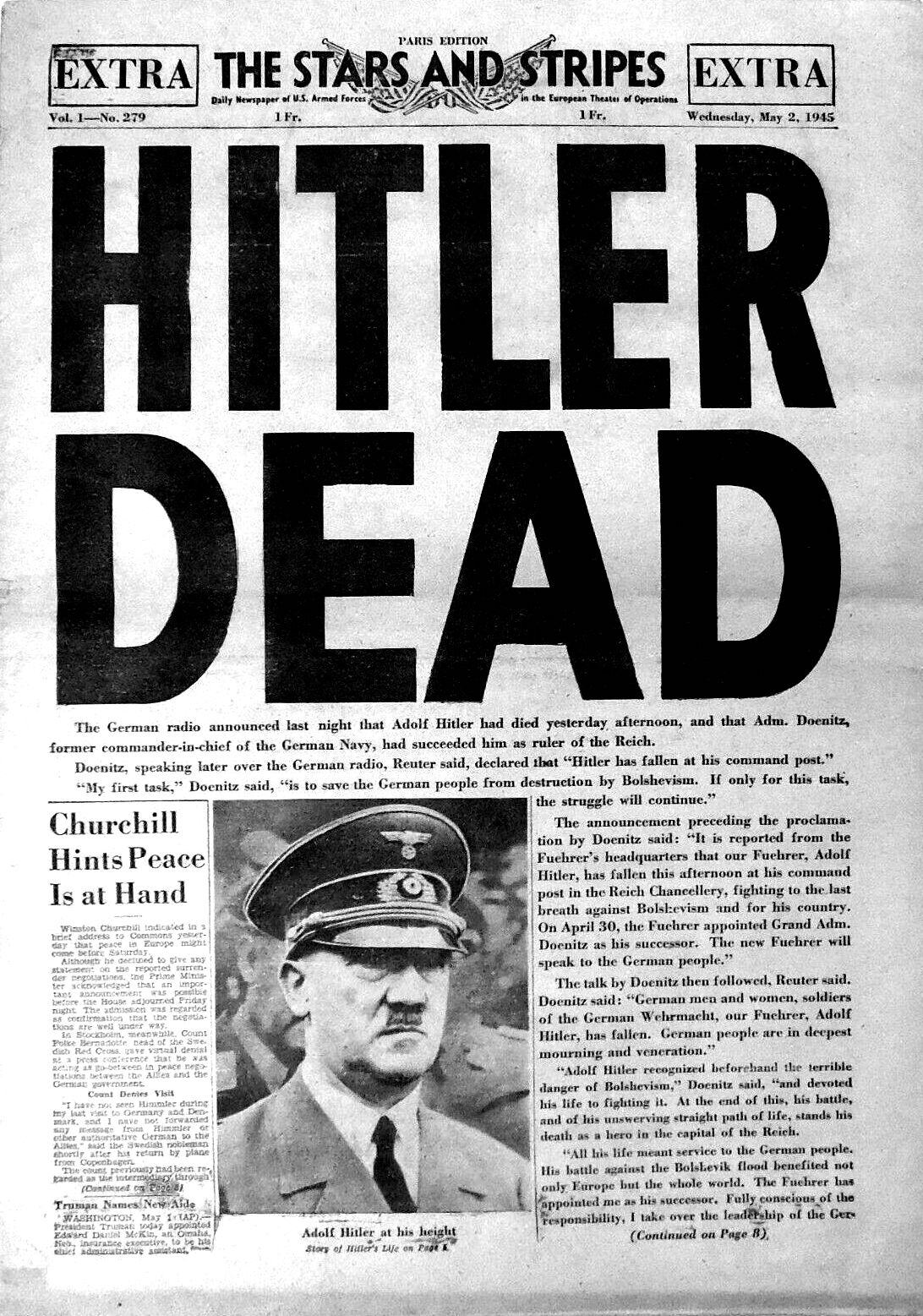
Adolf Hitler, along with his wife Eva Braun, committed suicide on 30 April 1945.

=== January ===
- 22 January – Else Lasker-Schüler, German poet (b. 1869), died in Palestine
- 23 January
  - Erwin Planck, German politician (b. 1893)
  - Helmuth James Graf von Moltke, German jurist (b. 1907)

=== February ===
- 2 February – Adolf Brand, German writer (b. 1874)
- 3 February – Roland Freisler, Nazi German judge (b. 1893)
- 7 February – Halfdan Jønsson, Norwegian trade unionist (b. 1891 in Norway)
- 13 February – Dorothea Köring, German tennis player (b. 1880)
- 14 February – Georg Kelling, German surgeon (b. 1866)
- 15 February – Helmut Möckel, youth leader and politician (b. 1909)
- 21 February – Adolf Brand, German writer (b. 1874)
- 3 February – Roland Freisler, Nazi German judge (b. 1893)

=== March ===
- February/March – Margot Frank, Anne Frank's old sister (b. 1926)
- March – Anne Frank, German-born Jewish diarist (typhus) (b. 1929)
- 7 March – Albrecht Penck, German geographer and geologist (b. 1858)
- 14 March – Mary Helen Young, Scottish nurse and resistance fighter during World War II (b. 1883 in Scotland)
- 16 March – Börries von Münchhausen, German poet (b. 1874)
- 19 March – Friedrich Fromm, German Nazi official (b. 1888)
- 29 March – Karl Sapper, German explorer, antiquarian and linguist (b. 1866)
- 31 March
  - Hans Fischer, German chemist, Nobel Prize laureate (b. 1881)
  - Hans Riegel Sr., German inventor and entrepreneur (b. 1893)

=== April ===
- April – Auguste van Pels, German-Jewish housemate of Anne Frank (b. 1900)
- 9 April
  - Dietrich Bonhoeffer, German theologian (hanged by Nazis) (b. 1906)
  - Wilhelm Canaris, German admiral of the Kaiserliche Marine and Kriegsmarine and head of the German Abwehr (b. 1887)
- 13 April – Ernst Cassirer, German philosopher (b. 1874)
- 14 April – Albert Vögler, German politician, industrialist and entrepreneur (b. 1877)
- 15 April – Curt Joël, German jurist (b. 1865)
- 18 April
  - Fred Neufeld, German physician (b. 1869)
  - Conrad Weygand, German chemist (b. 1890)
- 20 April
  - Erwin Bumke, German judge (b. 1874)
  - Hans Steinhoff, German film director (b. 1882)
- 21 April – Walter Model, German field marshal (b. 1891)
- 22 April – Käthe Kollwitz, German artist (b. 1867)
- 23 April – Klaus Bonhoeffer, German jurist (b. 1901)
- 24 April – Ernst-Robert Grawitz, German Reichsphysician (S.S. and Police) in the Third Reich (b. 1899)
- 27 April – Gisela Tschofenig, Austrian resistance activist (b. 1917)
- 28 April – Franz Brantzky, German painter, sculptor and architect (b. 1871)
- 29 April – Franz Breithaupt, German SS general (killed) (b. 1880)
- 30 April
  - Adolf Hitler, Austrian-born German Nazi dictator (suicide) (b. 1889)
  - Eva Braun, German wife of Adolf Hitler (suicide) (b. 1912)
  - Friedrich Kayßler, German actor (b. 1874)

=== May ===
- 1 May
  - Joseph Goebbels, German Nazi propagandist (suicide) (b. 1897)
  - Magda Goebbels, wife of Joseph Goebbels (suicide) (b. 1901)
- 2 May
  - Wilhelm Burgdorf, German general (b. 1895)
  - Martin Bormann, German Nazi leader (suicide) (b. 1900)
  - Hans Krebs, German general (b. 1898)
  - Max de Crinis, German psychiatrist (suicide) (b. 1889)
- 4 May
  - Fedor von Bock, German field marshal (b. 1880)
  - Karl Dannemann, German actor (b. 1896)
- 5 May – Peter van Pels, German-Jewish love interest of diarist Anne Frank (b. 1926)
- 8 May
  - Paul Giesler, German politician (b. 1895)
  - Ernst-Günther Baade, German general (gangrene) (b. 1897)
  - Wilhelm Rediess, SS and Police Leader of Nazi-occupied Norway (suicide) (b. 1900)
  - Josef Terboven, Reichskommissar of Nazi-occupied Norway (suicide) (b. 1898)
  - Bernhard Rust, Education Minister of Nazi Germany (suicide) (b. 1883)
- 19 May – Philipp Bouhler, German Nazi leader (suicide) (b. 1899)
- 20 May – Otto von Feldmann, German Imperial Army officer (b. 1873)
- 23 May – Heinrich Himmler, German head of the SS (suicide) (b. 1900)
- 27 May – Rudolf Querner, Waffen-SS general (b. 1893)

=== June ===
- 25 June – Friedrich von Lindequist, German colonial administrator (b. 1862)

=== July ===
- 6 July – Adolf Bertram, German cardinal of Roman Catholic Church (b. 1859)
- 12 July – Wolfram Freiherr von Richthofen, German field marshal (b. 1895)

=== August ===
- 29 August – Fritz Pfleumer, German engineer (b. 1881)
- 31 August – Friedrich Syrup, German politician (b. 1881)

=== September ===
- 10 September – Karl Kimmich, German banker (b. 1880)
- 15 September – Richard Friedrich Johannes Pfeiffer, German physician (b. 1858)
- 20 September – Eduard Wirths, German doctor, chief SS doctor at Auschwitz concentration camp (suicide) (b. 1909)
- 24 September – Hans Geiger, German physicist (b. 1882)

=== October ===
- 9 October – Gottlieb Hering, German Nazi concentration camp commandant (b. 1887)
- 25 October – Robert Ley, German Nazi politician (suicide) (b. 1890)

=== November ===
- 7 November – Wilhelm von Gayl, German politician (b. 1879)
- 8 November – August von Mackensen, German field marshal (b. 1849)
- 17 November – Frederick Francis IV, Grand Duke of Mecklenburg-Schwerin (b. 1882)
- 22 November – Hans Winkler, German botanist (b. 1877)

=== December ===
- 3 December – Adam Stegerwald, German politician (b. 1874)
- 28 December – Hermann Oncken, German historian (b. 1869)
- Date unknown – Hasso von Wedel, World War I German flying ace (b. 1893)
