= 1808 in Germany =

- Decades: 1800s; 1810s; 1820s
- See also: Other events of 1808; History of Germany • Timeline • Years

Events from the year 1808 in Germany.

== Incumbents ==
=== Kingdoms ===
- Kingdom of Prussia
  - Monarch – Frederick William III (16 November 1797 – 7 June 1840)
- Kingdom of Bavaria
  - Maximilian I (1 January 1806 – 13 October 1825)
- Kingdom of Saxony
  - Frederick Augustus I (20 December 1806 – 5 May 1827)
- Kingdom of Württemberg
  - Frederick I (22 December 1797 – 30 October 1816)

=== Grand Duchies ===
- Grand Duke of Baden
  - Charles Frederick (25 July 1806 – 10 June 1811)
- Grand Duke of Hesse
  - Louis I (14 August 1806 – 6 April 1830)
- Grand Duke of Mecklenburg-Schwerin
  - Frederick Francis I– (24 April 1785 – 1 February 1837)
- Grand Duke of Mecklenburg-Strelitz
  - Charles II (2 June 1794 – 6 November 1816)
- Grand Duke of Oldenburg
  - Wilhelm (6 July 1785 –2 July 1823 ) Due to mental illness, Wilhelm was duke in name only, with his cousin Peter, Prince-Bishop of Lübeck, acting as regent throughout his entire reign.
  - Peter I (2 July 1823 – 21 May 1829)
- Grand Duke of Saxe-Weimar
  - Karl August (1758–1809) Raised to a grand duchy in 1809

=== Principalities ===
- Schaumburg-Lippe
  - George William (13 February 1787 - 1860)
- Schwarzburg-Rudolstadt
  - Friedrich Günther (28 April 1807 – 28 June 1867)
- Schwarzburg-Sondershausen
  - Günther Friedrich Karl I (14 October 1794 – 19 August 1835)
- Principality of Lippe
  - Leopold II (5 November 1802 – 1 January 1851)
- Principality of Reuss-Greiz
  - Heinrich XIII (28 June 1800 – 29 January 1817)
- Waldeck and Pyrmont
  - Friedrich Karl August (29 August 1763 – 24 September 1812)

=== Duchies ===
- Duke of Anhalt-Dessau
  - Leopold III (16 December 1751 – 9 August 1817)
- Duke of Brunswick
  - Frederick William (16 October 1806 – 16 June 1815)
- Duke of Saxe-Altenburg
  - Duke of Saxe-Hildburghausen (1780–1826) - Frederick
- Duke of Saxe-Coburg and Gotha
  - Ernest I (9 December 1806 – 12 November 1826)
- Duke of Saxe-Meiningen
  - Bernhard II (24 December 1803 – 20 September 1866)
- Duke of Schleswig-Holstein-Sonderburg-Beck
  - Frederick Charles Louis (24 February 1775 – 25 March 1816)

== Events ==
- April- Prussian philosopher Johann Gottlieb Fichte publishes his Addresses to the German Nation, having delivered them over the winter at the Prussian Academy of Sciences in Berlin before crowded audiences.
- 27 September – The Congress of Erfurt, between the emperors Napoleon I of France and Alexander I of Russia, begins.
- 22 December – Beethoven concert of 22 December 1808: Ludwig van Beethoven conducts and plays piano in a marathon benefit concert, at the Theater an der Wien in Vienna, consisting entirely of first public performances of works by him, including Symphony No. 5, Symphony No. 6, Piano Concerto No. 4 and Choral Fantasy.
- German mathematician Carl Friedrich Gauss publishes Theorematis arithmetici demonstratio nova, introducing Gauss's lemma in the third proof of quadratic reciprocity.

=== Date unknown ===
- Goethe's Faust, Part One (Faust. Eine Tragödie, erster Teil) is published in full in Tübingen.
- The Academy of Fine Arts, Munich is given the title of Royal Academy of Fine Arts by King Maximilian I Joseph of Bavaria.

== Births ==
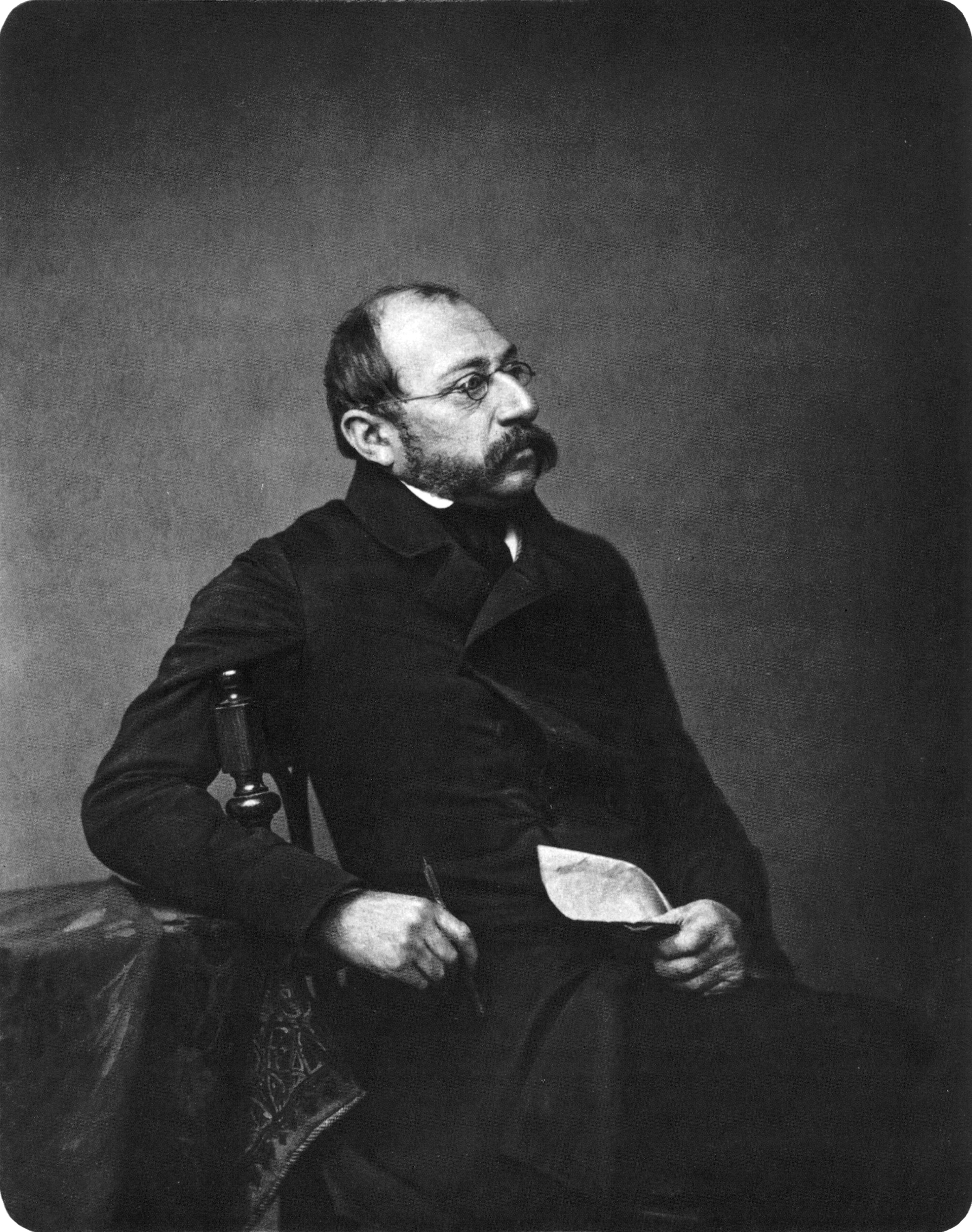
Carl Spitzweg

- 27 January – David Strauss, German theologian (died 1874)
- 5 February – Carl Spitzweg, German painter (died 1885)
- 20 June – Samson Raphael Hirsch, German rabbi (died 1888)
- 25 July – Johann Benedict Listing, German mathematician (died 1882).
- 20 October – Karl Andree, German geographer (died 1875)
- 6 November – Friedrich Julius Richelot, German mathematician (died 1875)
- Date unknown – Nikola Aleksić, Serbian portraitist in the Biedermeier artistic tradition and the Nazarene movement of 19th-century German painters (died 1873)

== Deaths ==
- 1 October – Carl Gotthard Langhans, German architect (born 1732)
- 4 December – Karl Ludwig Fernow, German art critic (born 1763)
