= 1874 in Germany =

- Decades: 1850s; 1860s; 1870s; 1880s; 1890s
- See also: Other events of 1874; History of Germany • Timeline • Years

Events in the year 1874 in Germany.

== Incumbents ==
=== National level ===
- Emperor – William I
- Chancellor – Otto von Bismarck

=== State level ===
==== Kingdoms ====
- King of Bavaria – Ludwig II
- King of Prussia – William I
- King of Saxony – Albert
- King of Württemberg – Charles

==== Grand Duchies ====
- Grand Duke of Baden – Frederick I
- Grand Duke of Hesse – Louis III
- Grand Duke of Mecklenburg-Schwerin – Frederick Francis II
- Grand Duke of Mecklenburg-Strelitz – Frederick William
- Grand Duke of Oldenburg – Peter II
- Grand Duke of Saxe-Weimar-Eisenach – Charles Alexander

==== Principalities ====
- Schaumburg-Lippe – Adolf I, Prince of Schaumburg-Lippe
- Schwarzburg-Rudolstadt – George Albert, Prince of Schwarzburg-Rudolstadt
- Schwarzburg-Sondershausen – Günther Friedrich Karl II, Prince of Schwarzburg-Sondershausen
- Principality of Lippe – Leopold III, Prince of Lippe
- Reuss Elder Line – Heinrich XXII, Prince Reuss of Greiz
- Reuss Younger Line – Heinrich XIV, Prince Reuss Younger Line
- Waldeck and Pyrmont – George Victor, Prince of Waldeck and Pyrmont

==== Duchies ====
- Duke of Anhalt – Frederick I, Duke of Anhalt
- Duke of Brunswick – William, Duke of Brunswick
- Duke of Saxe-Altenburg – Ernst I, Duke of Saxe-Altenburg
- Duke of Saxe-Coburg and Gotha – Ernest II, Duke of Saxe-Coburg and Gotha
- Duke of Saxe-Meiningen – Georg II, Duke of Saxe-Meiningen

== Events ==
- 10 January – German federal election, 1874

=== Date unknown ===
- German company HeidelbergCement is founded.

=== Science ===
- Georg Cantor's paper, Ueber eine Eigenschaft des Inbegriffes aller reellen algebraischen Zahlen ("On a Property of the Collection of All Real Algebraic Numbers") is published in Crelle's Journal, considered as the origin of set theory.

== Births ==
- 1 January –Gustav Albin Weißkopf, German-born aviation pioneer (died 1927)
- 1 February – Hugo von Hofmannsthal, German poet, dramatist and novelist (died 1929)
- 19 February – Max Adalbert, German actor (died 1933)
- 20 March – Börries von Münchhausen, German poet (died 1945)
- 7 April – Friedrich Kayßler, German actor (died 1945)
- 15 April – Johannes Stark, German physicist and Nobel Prize laureate (died 1957)
- 20 April – Carl Bergmann, German banker and diplomat (died 1935)
- 3 May – Ernst Scholz, German lawyer and politician (died 1932)
- 4 May – Bernhard Hoetger, German painter (died 1949)
- 2 June – Ludwig Roselius, German businessman (died 1943)
- 5 July – Eugen Fischer, German physician (died 1967)
- 7 July – Erwin Bumke, German judge (died 1945)
- 17 July – Max Maurenbrecher, SPD and Fatherland Party politician (died 1930)
- 28 July – Ernst Cassirer, German philosopher (died 1945)
- 29 July – August Stramm, German poet and playwright (died 1915)
- 27 August – Carl Bosch, German chemist and Nobel Prize laureate (died 1940)
- 12 September – Paul Kuhn, German operatic tenor (died 1966)
- 21 September – Karl Jarres, German politician (died 1951)
- 15 October - Alfred, Hereditary Prince of Saxe-Coburg and Gotha, German nobleman (died 1899)
- 16 October – Otto Mueller, German painter (died 1930)
- 17 October – Ludwig Siebert, German politician (died 1942)
- 1 November - Wilhelm Dittmann, German politician (died 1954)
- 14 November – Adolf Brand, German writer (died 1945)
- 17 November – Eduard Fresenius, German entrepreneur (died 1946)
- 11 December - Paul Wegener, German actor (died 1948)
- 14 December – Adam Stegerwald, German politician (died 1945)
- 26 December – Hans von Rosenberg, German diplomat and politician (died 1937)

== Deaths ==
- 5 January - Ernst Gotthelf Gersdorf, German writer and librarian (born 1804)
- 14 January – Johann Philipp Reis, German scientist (born 1834)
- 19 January – August Heinrich Hoffmann von Fallersleben (born 1798)
- 26 February - Johann Georg Ludwig Hesekiel, German writer (born 1819)
- 1 April – August Heinrich Hermann von Dönhoff, German statesman (born 1797)
- 7 April - Wilhelm von Kaulbach, German painter (born 1805)
- 20 April – Gustav Bläser, German sculptor (born 1813)
- 23 October – Abraham Geiger, German rabbi and scholar, considered the founding father of Reform Judaism (born 1810)
- 2 November - Ernst Gotthelf Gersdorf, German writer and librarian (born 1804)
- 15 November - Heinrich Brockhaus, German publisher (born 1804)
- 7 December - Constantin von Tischendorf, German biblical scholar (born 1815)
- 27 December – Ernst Litfaß, German printer and publisher (born 1816)
