= Carl Bergmann =

Carl Bergman(n) may refer to:

- Carl Bergmann (musician) (1821–1876), German-American cellist and conductor
- Carl Bergmann (anatomist) (1814–1865), German anatomist
- Carl Bergmann (politician) (1874–1935), German secretary of state
- Carl Bergman (born 1987), Swedish tennis player
- Carl Johan Bergman (born 1978), Swedish biathlete

== See also ==
- Karl Bergmann (disambiguation)
- Karl Brugmann, German linguist
