= 1810 in Germany =

- Decades: 1800s; 1810s; 1820s; 1830s
- See also: Other events of 1810; History of Germany • Timeline • Years

Events from the year 1810 in Germany.

== Incumbents ==
=== Kingdoms ===
- Kingdom of Prussia
  - Monarch – Frederick William III (16 November 1797 – 7 June 1840)
- Kingdom of Bavaria
  - Maximilian I (1 January 1806 – 13 October 1825)
- Kingdom of Saxony
  - Frederick Augustus I (20 December 1806 – 5 May 1827)
- Kingdom of Württemberg
  - Frederick I (22 December 1797 – 30 October 1816)

=== Grand Duchies ===
- Grand Duke of Baden
  - Charles Frederick (25 July 1806 – 10 June 1811)
- Grand Duke of Hesse
  - Louis I (14 August 1806 – 6 April 1830)
- Grand Duke of Mecklenburg-Schwerin
  - Frederick Francis I– (24 April 1785 – 1 February 1837)
- Grand Duke of Mecklenburg-Strelitz
  - Charles II (2 June 1794 – 6 November 1816)
- Grand Duke of Oldenburg
  - Wilhelm (6 July 1785 –2 July 1823 ) Due to mental illness, Wilhelm was duke in name only, with his cousin Peter, Prince-Bishop of Lübeck, acting as regent throughout his entire reign.
  - Peter I (2 July 1823 - 21 May 1829)
- Grand Duke of Saxe-Weimar-Eisenach
  - Karl August (1809–1815)

=== Principalities ===
- Schaumburg-Lippe
  - George William (13 February 1787 - 1860)
- Schwarzburg-Rudolstadt
  - Friedrich Günther (28 April 1807 - 28 June 1867)
- Schwarzburg-Sondershausen
  - Günther Friedrich Karl I (14 October 1794 - 19 August 1835)
- Principality of Lippe
  - Leopold II (5 November 1802 - 1 January 1851)
- Principality of Reuss-Greiz
  - Heinrich XIII (28 June 1800 – 29 January 1817)
- Waldeck and Pyrmont
  - Friedrich Karl August (29 August 1763 – 24 September 1812)

=== Duchies ===
- Duke of Anhalt-Dessau
  - Leopold III (16 December 1751 – 9 August 1817)
- Duke of Brunswick
  - Frederick William (16 October 1806 – 16 June 1815)
- Duke of Saxe-Altenburg
  - Duke of Saxe-Hildburghausen (1780–1826) - Frederick
- Duke of Saxe-Coburg and Gotha
  - Ernest I (9 December 1806 – 12 November 1826)
- Duke of Saxe-Meiningen
  - Bernhard II (24 December 1803 – 20 September 1866)
- Duke of Schleswig-Holstein-Sonderburg-Beck
  - Frederick Charles Louis (24 February 1775 – 25 March 1816)

== Events ==
- 27 April – Beethoven composes his famous piano piece, Für Elise.
- 16 May – Johann Wolfgang von Goethe publishes his book Zu Farbenlehre (Theory of Colours).
- 12 October – First Oktoberfest: Bavarian royalty invites the citizens of Munich to join the celebration of the marriage of Crown Prince Ludwig of Bavaria, to Princess Therese of Saxe-Hildburghausen.

=== Date unknown ===
Goethe publishes Theory of Colours

- Friedrich Krupp establishes a steel foundry in Essen.
- Germaine de Staël's study of Germany De l'Allemagne is published in Paris but suppressed by order of Napoleon.
- Brandenburger Symphoniker established.
- Prussian Staff College established.

== Births ==
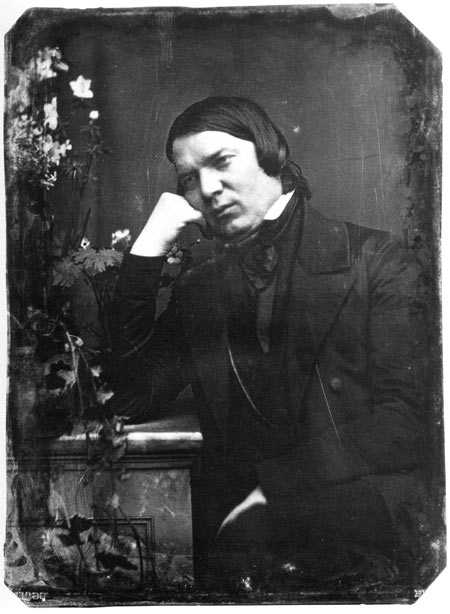
Robert Schumann

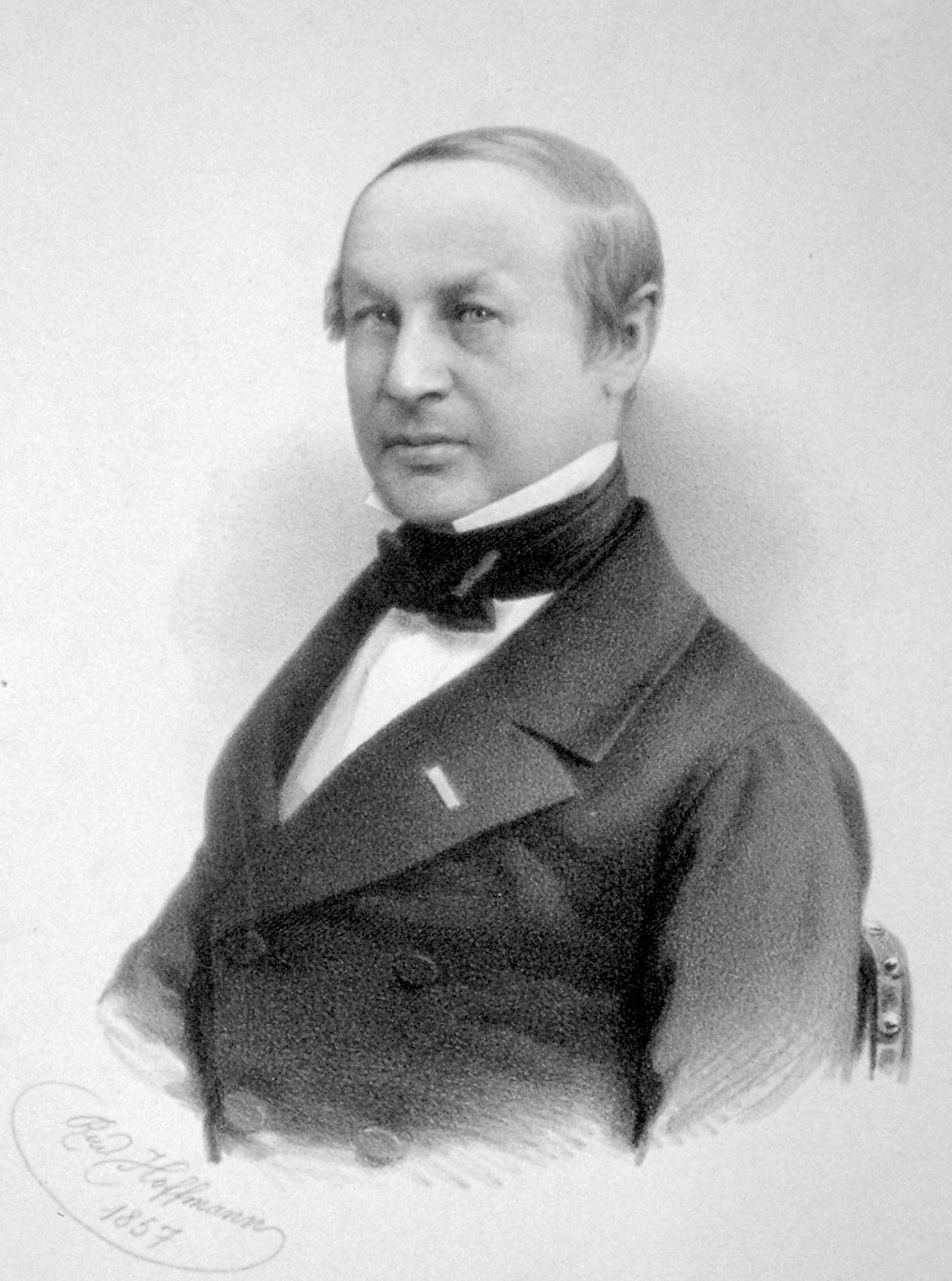
Theodor Schwann

- 29 January – Ernst Kummer, German mathematician (d. 1893)
- 24 May – Abraham Geiger, German rabbi, founder of European Reform Judaism (d. 1874)
- 8 June – Robert Schumann, German composer, pianist (d. 1856)
- 9 June – Otto Nicolai, German composer, conductor (d. 1849)
- 17 July – Georg Heinrich Busse, German landscape painter and engraver (died 1868)
- 20 July – Leonhard Graf von Blumenthal, Prussian field marshal (d. 1908)
- 11 October – Anton Zwengauer, German painter (d. 1884)
- 7 December – Theodor Schwann, German physiologist (d. 1882)

== Deaths ==
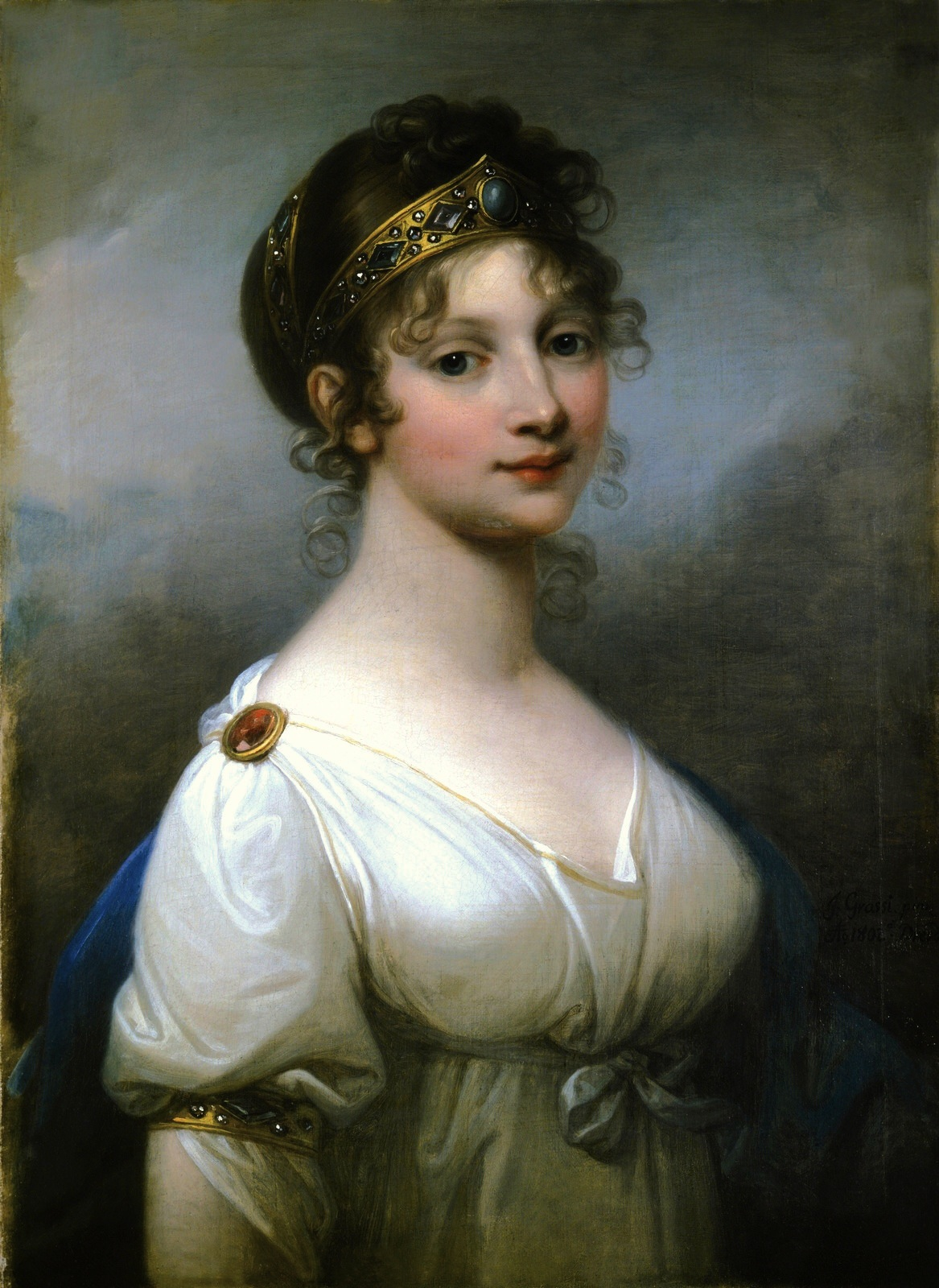
Louise of Mecklenburg-Strelitz

- 23 January – Johann Wilhelm Ritter, German chemist, physicist (b. 1776)
- 14 March – Ludwig Timotheus Spittler, German historian (born 1752)
- 1 May – Christoph Meiners, German philosopher (born 1747)
- 19 July – Louise of Mecklenburg-Strelitz, Queen of Prussia (b. 1776)
- 11 November – Johan Zoffany, German-born painter (b. 1733)
- 2 December – Philipp Otto Runge, German painter (b. 1777)
