= Karl Bergmann =

Karl Bergmann may refer to:

- Karl Bergmann (actor)
- Karl Bergmann (politician)

== See also ==
- Carl Bergmann (disambiguation)
