= 1807 in Germany =

- Decades: 1800s; 1810s; 1820s
- See also: Other events of 1807; History of Germany • Timeline • Years

Events from the year 1807 in Germany saw a major battle in Danzig and the loss of a third of Prussian land to Napoleon to form the Duchy of Warsaw.

== Incumbents ==
=== Kingdoms ===
- Kingdom of Prussia
  - Monarch – Frederick William III (16 November 1797 – 7 June 1840)
- Kingdom of Bavaria
  - Maximilian I (1 January 1806 – 13 October 1825)
- Kingdom of Saxony
  - Frederick Augustus I (20 December 1806 – 5 May 1827)
- Kingdom of Württemberg
  - Frederick I (22 December 1797 – 30 October 1816)

=== Grand Duchies ===
- Grand Duke of Baden
  - Charles Frederick (25 July 1806 – 10 June 1811)
- Grand Duke of Hesse
  - Louis I (14 August 1806 – 6 April 1830)
- Grand Duke of Mecklenburg-Schwerin
  - Frederick Francis I (24 April 1785 – 1 February 1837)
- Grand Duke of Mecklenburg-Strelitz
  - Charles II (2 June 1794 – 6 November 1816)
- Grand Duke of Oldenburg
  - Wilhelm (6 July 1785 – 2 July 1823) Due to mental illness, Wilhelm was duke in name only, with his cousin Peter, Prince-Bishop of Lübeck, acting as regent throughout his entire reign.
  - Peter I (2 July 1823 – 21 May 1829)
- Grand Duke of Saxe-Weimar
  - Karl August (1758–1809) Raised to grand duchy in 1809

=== Principalities ===
- Schaumburg-Lippe
  - George William (13 February 1787 – 1860)
- Schwarzburg-Rudolstadt
  - Louis Frederick II (13 April 1793 – 28 April 1807)
  - Friedrich Günther (28 April 1807 – 28 June 1867)
- Schwarzburg-Sondershausen
  - Günther Friedrich Karl I (14 October 1794 – 19 August 1835)
- Principality of Lippe
  - Leopold II (5 November 1802 – 1 January 1851)
- Principality of Reuss-Greiz
  - Heinrich XIII (28 June 1800 – 29 January 1817)
- Waldeck and Pyrmont
  - Friedrich Karl August (29 August 1763 – 24 September 1812)

=== Duchies ===
- Duke of Anhalt-Dessau
  - Leopold III (16 December 1751 – 9 August 1817)
- Duke of Brunswick
  - Frederick William (16 October 1806 – 16 June 1815)
- Duke of Saxe-Altenburg
  - Duke of Saxe-Hildburghausen (1780–1826) - Frederick
- Duke of Saxe-Coburg and Gotha
  - Ernest I (9 December 1806 – 12 November 1826)
- Duke of Saxe-Meiningen
  - Bernhard II (24 December 1803 – 20 September 1866)
- Duke of Schleswig-Holstein-Sonderburg-Beck
  - Frederick Charles Louis (24 February 1775 – 25 March 1816)

== Events ==
- 25 January – Battle of Mohrungen
- 3 February – Battle of Allenstein
- March – 2 July – Siege of Kolberg
- April 1–3 – Great Sortie of Stralsund
- 24 May – Siege of Danzig ends after 6 weeks with Prussian and Russian defenders capitulating to French forces.
- 5/6 June – Battle of Guttstadt-Deppen
- 10 June – Battle of Heilsberg
- 7–9 July – The Treaties of Tilsit are signed between France, Prussia and Russia. Napoleon and Russian Emperor Alexander I ally together against the British. The Prussians are forced to cede more than half their territory, which is formed into the Duchy of Warsaw in their former Polish lands, and the Kingdom of Westphalia in western Germany. The Free City of Danzig is also formed (established 9 September by Napoleon).
- 24 July-24 August – Siege of Stralsund
- 7/8 October – Battle of Eylau
- 9 October – Prussian Reform Movement: Serfdom is abolished by the October edict.
- Ludwig Order established.
- Morgenblatt für gebildete Stände established.

== Births ==
- 4 February – Max Emanuel Ainmiller, German glass painter (died 1870)
- 30 June – Friedrich Theodor Vischer, German author (died 1887)
- 16 November – Eduard von Fransecky, Prussian general (died 1890)
- 8 December – Friedrich Traugott Kützing, German pharmacist, botanist and phycologist (died 1893)

== Deaths ==
- 10 April – Duchess Anna Amalia of Brunswick-Wolfenbüttel, regent of Weimar and Eisenach (born 1739)
- 19 December – Friedrich Melchior, Baron von Grimm, German writer (born 1723)
