= 1806 in Germany =

- Decades: 1800s; 1810s; 1820s
- See also: Other events of 1806; History of Germany • Timeline • Years

Events from the year 1806 in Germany.

== Incumbents ==
Holy Roman Empire

- Francis II (5 July 1792 – 6 August 1806)

=== Kingdoms ===
- Kingdom of Prussia
  - Monarch – Frederick William III (16 November 1797 – 7 June 1840)
- Kingdom of Bavaria
  - Maximilian I (1 January 1806 – 13 October 1825)
- Kingdom of Saxony
  - Frederick Augustus I (20 December 1806 – 5 May 1827)
- Kingdom of Württemberg
  - Frederick I (22 December 1797 – 30 October 1816)

=== Grand Duchies ===
- Grand Duke of Baden
  - Charles Frederick (25 July 1806 – 10 June 1811)
- Grand Duke of Hesse
  - Louis I (14 August 1806 – 6 April 1830)
- Grand Duke of Mecklenburg-Schwerin
  - Frederick Francis I (24 April 1785 – 1 February 1837)
- Grand Duke of Mecklenburg-Strelitz
  - Charles II (2 June 1794 – 6 November 1816)
- Grand Duke of Oldenburg
  - Wilhelm (6 July 1785 – 2 July 1823) Due to mental illness, Wilhelm was duke in name only, with his cousin Peter, Prince-Bishop of Lübeck, acting as regent throughout his entire reign.
  - Peter I (2 July 1823 – 21 May 1829)
- Grand Duke of Saxe-Weimar
  - Karl August (1758–1809) Raised to grand duchy in 1809

=== Principalities ===
- Schaumburg-Lippe
  - George William (13 February 1787 – 1860)
- Schwarzburg-Rudolstadt
  - Louis Frederick II (13 April 1793 – 28 April 1807)
- Schwarzburg-Sondershausen
  - Günther Friedrich Karl I (14 October 1794 – 19 August 1835)
- Principality of Lippe
  - Leopold II (5 November 1802 – 1 January 1851)
- Principality of Reuss-Greiz
  - Heinrich XIII (28 June 1800 – 29 January 1817)
- Waldeck and Pyrmont
  - Friedrich Karl August (29 August 1763 – 24 September 1812)

=== Duchies ===
- Duke of Anhalt-Dessau
  - Leopold III (16 December 1751 – 9 August 1817)
- Duke of Brunswick
  - Frederick William (16 October 1806 – 16 June 1815)
- Duke of Saxe-Altenburg
  - Duke of Saxe-Hildburghausen (1780–1826) - Frederick
- Duke of Saxe-Coburg and Gotha
  - Ernest I (9 December 1806 – 12 November 1826)
- Duke of Saxe-Meiningen
  - Bernhard II (24 December 1803 – 20 September 1866)
- Duke of Schleswig-Holstein-Sonderburg-Beck
  - Frederick Charles Louis (24 February 1775 – 25 March 1816)

== Events ==
- 1 January – The Kingdom of Bavaria is established by Napoleon.
- 12 July – Sixteen German Imperial States leave the Holy Roman Empire and form the Confederation of the Rhine; Liechtenstein is given full sovereignty, leading to the collapse of the Empire after 844 years.
- 6 August – Francis II, the last Holy Roman Emperor, abdicates, thus ending the Holy Roman Empire after about a millennium.
- 25 September – Prussia issues an ultimatum to Paris, threatening war if France does not halt marching its troops through Prussian territory to reach Austria; the message does not reach Napoleon Bonaparte until 7 October, and he responds by attacking Prussia.
- 8 October – Napoleon responds to the 25 September ultimatum from Prussia, and begins the War of the Fourth Coalition; Prussia is joined by Saxony and other minor German states.
- 9 October – Battle of Schleiz: French and Prussian forces fight for the first time since the war began. The Prussian army is easily defeated, by a more numerous French force.
- 10 October – Battle of Saalfeld
- 14 October – Battle of Jena–Auerstedt: Napoleon defeats the Prussian army of Prince Hohenlohe at Jena, while Marshal Davout defeats the main Prussian army under Charles William Ferdinand, Duke of Brunswick-Wolfenbüttel, who is killed.
- 16 October – Capitulation of Erfurt
- 17 October – Battle of Halle
- 24 October – French forces enter Berlin.
- 25 October – 8 November – Siege of Magdeburg
- 28 October – Battle of Prenzlau
- 29 October – Capitulation of Pasewalk
- 30 October – Capitulation of Stettin: Believing themselves massively outnumbered, the 5,300-man garrison at Stettin in Prussia surrenders to a much smaller French force without a fight.
- 1 November – Battle of Waren-Nossentin
- 6 November – Battle of Lübeck
- 7–22 November – Siege of Hamelin
- 21 November – Berlin Decree

== Births ==
- 1 January – Lionel Kieseritzky, Baltic-German chess player (died 1853)
- 13 January – Eugen Napoleon Neureuther, German painter and illustrator (died 1882)
- 18 February – Eduard Heis, German mathematician and astronomer (died 1877)
- 6 April – Friedrich Wilhelm Ritschl, German scholar (died 1876)
- 12 June – John Augustus Roebling, German-American engineer (died 1869)
- 22 July – Johann Kaspar Zeuss, German historian and philologist (died 1856)

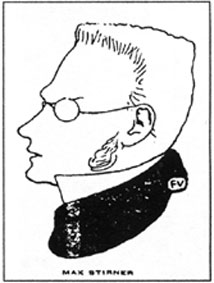
Max Stirner

- 25 October – Max Stirner, German philosopher (died 1856)
- 23 November – Philipp Hoffmann, German architect and builder (died 1869)
- 11 December – Otto Wilhelm Hermann von Abich, German geologist (died 1886)

== Deaths ==
- 6 January – Jean Henri Riesener, German furniture designer (born 1734)
- 3 March – Heinrich Christian Boie, German poet and editor (born 1744)
- 23 August – Johann Eleazar Zeissig, German genre, portrait and porcelain painter, and engraver (born 1737)
- 10 October – Therese Maron, German painter active in Rome (born 1725)
- 10 October – Louis Ferdinand of Prussia, German prince (killed in battle) (born 1772)

=== Date unknown ===
- Johann Gottfried Arnold, German cellist (born 1773)
