= Weltsekttag =

German holiday

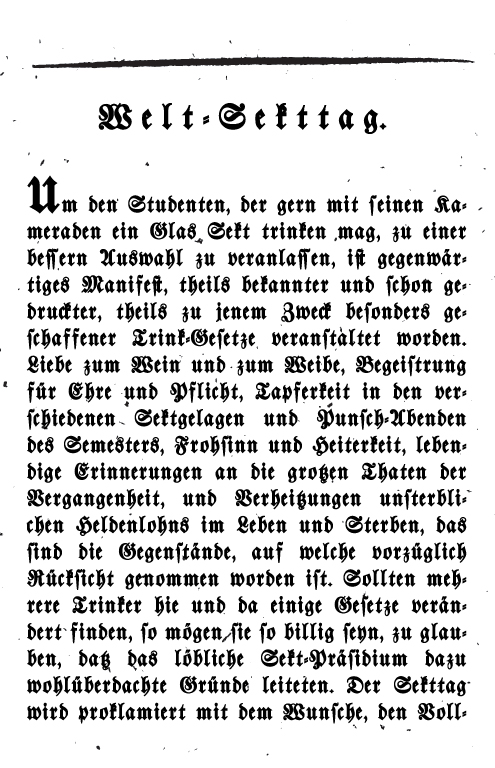
First page of the manifesto printed for the "Sekttag" of 1805

The Internationaler Sekttag, Weltsekttag or Sekttag is celebrated on 9 April, occasionally also upon other days, mainly amongst German-speaking students and members of German Student Corps and Studentenverbindungen in general.

The tradition of the Weltsekttag was founded in the short interim period separating the wars of the Second and Third Coalition, and was initiated amongst others by the German poet Ludwig Achim von Arnim as a sign of unity against the tyranny of Napoleon Bonaparte.

== History ==
=== The Sekttag of 1805 ===
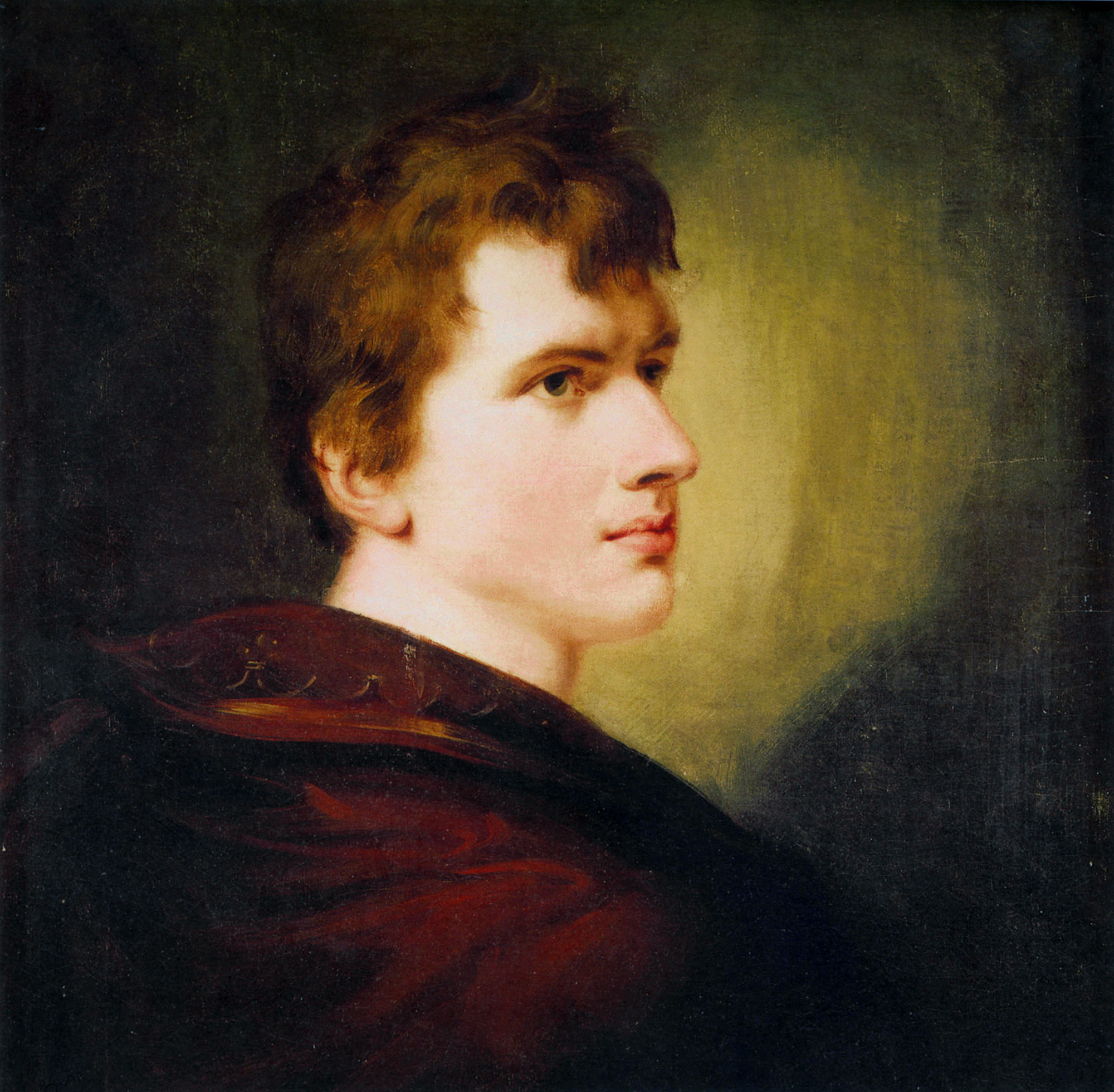
Achim von Arnim as a student in the year 1804

German student and poet Carl Ludwig Börne was the first to propose the celebration of a Weltsekttag during an academic conference held at Gießen upon the 4th of March 1805, without favouring a particular date, however. The idea was inspired by attempts in the previous years by French vintners to initiate collective day of marked resistance to the coalition wars and the resulting economic conditions which had had a strongly negative effect upon the wine trade. These attempts were largely unsuccessful. Ludwig Achim von Arnim brought the idea to Halle an der Saale, one of the oldest and most important German universities and a centre of the literary movement of the Enlightenment in the late 18th and early 19th century, where it was picked up by academic "Kränzchen" ("little circles") and "Convente" ("conventions") of similar corporations.

While it was the poet Ludwig Achim von Arnim who carried the original idea to Halle, it were the German poets Ludwig Börne and Clemens Brentano who were responsible for the foundation of the actual tradition of the fixed Sekttag during the 1805 conference of Gießen, where the decision was accepted.

The Beschluss (decision) of Gießen read as follows:

Im Einvernehmen mit den politischen und freiheitlichen Organisationen der Studenten in ihrem Lande veranstalten die der Freiheit liebenden Sektgenießer aller Länder jedes Jahr einen Sekttag, oder mehrere, der in erster Linie der Agitation gegen den französischen Tyrannen dient. […] Der Sekttag muß einen Charakter tragen der alle Menschen und Völker repräsentirt und ist sorgfältig vorzubereiten.

In accordance with the political and free organizations of the students in their respective countries the freedom-loving enjoyers of good wine will celebrate yearly a Sekttag as an open sign of protest and agitation against the French tyrant. […] The Sekttag must represent in its character all men and all peoples and must be prepared with the greatest care.

The first Sekttag was subsequently celebrated upon the 9th of April 1805 in Germany, Austria and Switzerland. The choice of the date was intended to symbolically represent and underline the happy and open-minded character of the Sekttag.

== Situation today ==
Today, more than 200 years after the original celebrations, students gather yearly upon the 9th of April (and also occasionally upon other days, varying from university city to university city) either under more organized forms of tradition or in less formal gatherings, to drink sparkling wine and honour the memory of the great poets and students. Academic drawings and paintings from the first half of the 19th century not rarely depicts a drinking student who stands upon a table with a glass in his hand, which is a telling reference to the popularity which the tradition would soon come to enjoy. Achim von Arnims immortal "Sektlied" is still sung around the world by German-speaking celebrants:

Schafft her den Sekt! - Ein brav Student
Zecht fest bis er verreckt
Voll bis zum Rand, doch eloquent
Den Vollrausch er bezweckt!

So stürmen wir mit Saus und Braus
In die verlog'ne Welt hinaus
Und wer da bleibt allein zuhaus
Den holen wir beim Teufel raus!

Vivallera! Vivallera!
