= 1953 in Germany =

- Decades: 1930s; 1940s; 1950s; 1960s; 1970s
- See also: Other events of 1953; History of Germany • Timeline • Years

Events in the year 1953 in Germany.

== Incumbents ==
- President – Theodor Heuss
- Chancellor – Konrad Adenauer

== Events ==
- 12 March - 1953 Avro Lincoln shootdown incident
- 12 April - Football team Dynamo Dresden was founded.
- 10 May - The town of Chemnitz, East Germany becomes Karl Marx Stadt.
- 16/17 June - Uprising of 1953 in East Germany
- 18 to 20 June - 3rd Berlin International Film Festival
- 7 July - 1953 Menzengraben mining accident
- 6 September - West German federal election, 1953
- 20 October - The Second Adenauer cabinet led by Konrad Adenauer was sworn in.
- Date unknown - Ziegler–Natta catalyst invented by Karl Ziegler and Giulio Natta.

== Births ==
- January 10 - Guido Kratschmer, German decathlete
- January 16 - Reinhard Jirgl, German writer
- January 22 - Jürgen Pommerenke, German football player
- January 24 - Ulrich Holbein, German writer
- January 31 - Gertrude Lübbe-Wolff, German judge
- March 1 - Rolf Danneberg, German discus thrower
- March 14 - Christian von Ditfurth, German historian
- March 24 - Mathias Richling, German comedian
- February 25 - Martin Kippenberger, German artist (died 1997)
- April 10 - Heiner Lauterbach, German actor
- May 11 - Thomas Middelhoff, German manager
- May 18 - Ute Kircheis-Wessel, German fencer
- June 20 - Ulrich Mühe, German actor (died 2007)
- June 23 - Michael Eichberger, German judge
- July 23 - Karl-Heinz Radschinsky, German weightlifter
- July 26 - Felix Magath, German footballer and football trainer
- July 30 - Heribert Prantl, German journalist
- August 17 - Andreas Kirchner, German Winter sportsman (died 2010)
- August 17 - Herta Müller, German writer
- August 24 - Georg Nagel, German biophysicist, Nobel Prize laureate
- August 27 - Gabriele Haefs, German translator
- August 29 - Rainer Pottel, German decathlete
- September 2 - Gerhard Thiele, German astronaut
- September 21 - Reinhard Marx, German cardinal of the Catholic Church
- November 7 - Ottfried Fischer, German actor
- November 16 - Brigitte Zypries, German politician
- October 1 - Klaus Wowereit, German politician
- October 10 - Martin Viessmann, German businessman
- October 15 - Günther Oettinger, German politician
- December 11 - Klaus Schmidt, German archaeologist (died 2014)
- December 23 - Rüdiger, Margrave of Meissen, German nobleman (died 2022)
- December 26 - Henning Schmitz, German musician
- December 29
  - Thomas Bach, 9th president of the IOC
  - Matthias Platzeck, German politician

== Deaths ==
- 28 January - Theophil Wurm, German leader in the German Protestant Church in the early twentieth century (born 1868)
- 20 January - Ernest Augustus, Duke of Brunswick (born 1913)
- 24 February - Gerd von Rundstedt, German field marshal (born 1875)
- 28 March - Alfred Philippson, German geographer (born 1864)
- 2 April - Hugo Sperrle, German field marshal of Luftwaffe (born 1885)
- 20 April - Erich Weinert, German writer (born 1890)
- 12 May - Fritz Mackensen, German painter (born 1866)
- 18 May - Rudolf Nadolny, German diplomat (born 1873)
- 21 May - Ernst Zermelo, German mathematician (born 1871)
- 31 July - Georg Zacharias, German swimmer (born 1884)
- 13 August - Paul Kemp, German actor (born 1896)
- 15 August - Ludwig Prandtl, German engineer (born 1875)
- 24 September — Hugo Schmeisser, German weapons designer (born 1884)
- 29 September- Ernst Reuter, German politician (born 1889)
- 27 October — Eduard Künneke, German composer (born 1885)
