= Conrad Weygand =

German chemist (1890–1945)

Conrad Weygand (8 November 1890 – 18 April 1945) was Professor of Chemistry at the University of Leipzig.

In 1938 he put forward a method for the classification of chemical reactions based on bond breakage and formation during the reaction. The preparative part of his book, Organisch-Chemische Experimentierkunst, was translated into English and published as Organic Preparations by Interscience Publishers, Inc. in 1946.

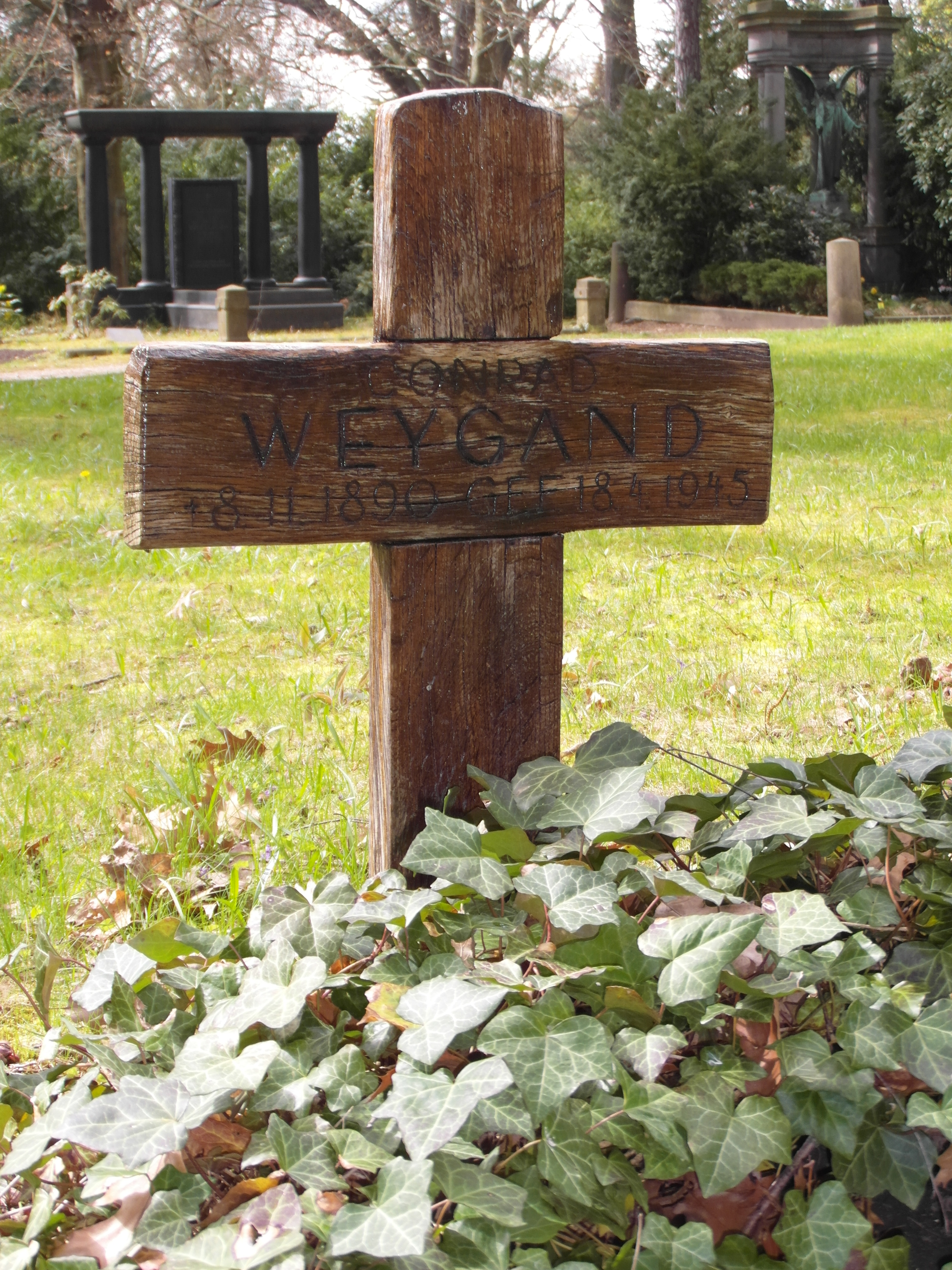
Gravesite of Weygand at Südfriedhof (Leipzig).

His book about German chemistry introduces similar thoughts like there were presented by Philipp Lenard in his Deutsche Physik movement.

Enlisting as a commander of a Volkssturm unit, Conrad Weygand was killed in action on 18 April 1945 in Leipzig against US ground forces during the final battle for the city.
