= Franz Brantzky =

German artist

Franz Brantzky (19 January 1871 – 28 April 1945) was a German painter, architect and sculptor.

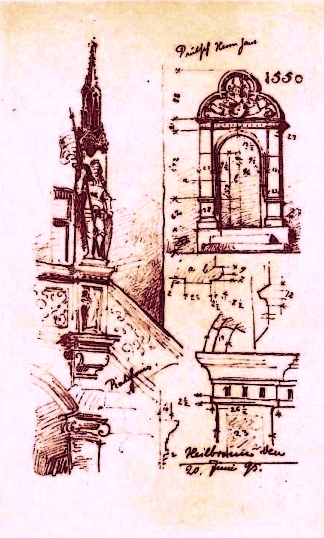
Drawing by Franz Brantzky

== Life ==
Brantzky was born in Cologne, where he graduated from the "Gewerblichen Fachschulen" (industrial technical schools) in decorative painting, modeling and chiselling and worked since 1888 in the studio of architect Georg Eberlein. From 1896 he was an independent architect and achieved numerous successes in competitions, for example, for his design for the "Bergschule" in Bochum. From 1902 he studied at the "Akademie der Bildenden Künste München" (Academy of Fine Arts, Munich) under Franz von Stuck and opened in the same year his "studio for artistic architecture and design". He worked from 1904 in Cologne again and designed monuments, mansions and the dam of "Möhnetalsperre", then the largest dam in Europe. In 1908, he designed the Kunstgewerbemuseum for the then-new Museum Schnütgen in Cologne. In November 1919, a monument by Brantzky to the late Cologne cyclist Peter Günther was unveiled at the Cologne Southern Cemetery. Brantzky was a soldier in the First World War. At his death in Dinkelsbühl in 1945, he was destitute.
