= Fritz Lang (artist) =

German painter (1877–1961)

Self portrait

Fritz Lang (15 March 1877 – 26 October 1961) was a German painter, noted for his woodcuts, linocuts, lithographs, and book illustrations.

Born in Stuttgart, he was an apprentice decorative painter from 1892 and 1894, after which he attended the Königlich-Württembergische Kunstschule in Stuttgart, and the Karlsruher Akademie.

In 1899, he returned to Stuttgart, finding freelance work to generate an income. During this period, he produced numerous woodcuts, some of which were purchased by the British Museum, the Königliche Kupferstichkabinett of Stuttgart, and the Hofbibliothek in Vienna.

Between 1915 and 1918, during World War I, he was conscripted and served with the armed forces. The post-war conditions in Germany were not conducive to artistic expression, and Lang's output was minimal during this period. By 1924, some of his work had been bought by the Victoria and Albert Museum and the Whitworth Art Gallery of Manchester. A trip to the former colony of German East Africa in 1928 inspired Lang, and he produced a large number of woodcuts and paintings with an African theme.

During World War II, the Allied bombing of Stuttgart destroyed Lang's studio. As a result, his works became rare and valuable. Some 330 of his woodblocks survived the war. His animal and bird studies were outstanding, and clearly inspired other German and Austrian artists in their technique and composition. The influence of Japanese woodcut masters on Lang's work is evident.

== Bibliography ==
- Fritz Lang (1877-1961) Maler und Holzschneider : Monografie und Werkverzeichnis - Ingobert Schmid und Stefan Sandkühler - Published 1992 by K. Theiss in Stuttgart ISBN 3-8062-1045-4
