= 1876 in Germany =

- Decades: 1850s; 1860s; 1870s; 1880s; 1890s
- See also: Other events of 1876; History of Germany • Timeline • Years

Events in the year 1876 in Germany.

== Incumbents ==
=== National level ===
- Emperor – William I
- Chancellor – Otto von Bismarck

=== State level ===
==== Kingdoms ====
- King of Bavaria – Ludwig II
- King of Prussia – William I
- King of Saxony – Albert
- King of Württemberg – Charles

==== Grand Duchies ====
- Grand Duke of Baden – Frederick I
- Grand Duke of Hesse – Louis III
- Grand Duke of Mecklenburg-Schwerin – Frederick Francis II
- Grand Duke of Mecklenburg-Strelitz – Frederick William
- Grand Duke of Oldenburg – Peter II
- Grand Duke of Saxe-Weimar-Eisenach – Charles Alexander

==== Principalities ====
- Schaumburg-Lippe – Adolf I, Prince of Schaumburg-Lippe
- Schwarzburg-Rudolstadt – George Albert, Prince of Schwarzburg-Rudolstadt
- Schwarzburg-Sondershausen – Gonthier Frederick Charles II, Prince of Schwarzburg-Sondershausen
- Principality of Lippe – Woldemar, Prince of Lippe
- Reuss Elder Line – Heinrich XXII, Prince Reuss of Greiz
- Reuss Younger Line – Heinrich XIV, Prince Reuss Younger Line
- Waldeck and Pyrmont – George Victor, Prince of Waldeck and Pyrmont

==== Duchies ====
- Duke of Anhalt – Frederick I, Duke of Anhalt
- Duke of Brunswick – William, Duke of Brunswick
- Duke of Saxe-Altenburg – Ernst I, Duke of Saxe-Altenburg
- Duke of Saxe-Coburg and Gotha – Ernst II, Duke of Saxe-Coburg and Gotha
- Duke of Saxe-Meiningen – Georg II, Duke of Saxe-Meiningen

== Events ==
- The Augusteum art museum is founded in Oldenburg

== Births ==
- 5 January – Konrad Adenauer, German politician, former Chancellor of Germany (died 1967)
- 23 January – Otto Diels, German chemist (died 1954)
- 1 March – Arthur Ruppin, Jewish Palestinian Zionist leader (died 1943)
- 14 March – Otto Röhm, German pharmacist (died 1939)
- 18 May – Hermann Müller, German politician (died 1931)
- 5 June – Isaac Heinemann, Israeli rabbinical scholar and a professor of literature (died 1957)
- 2 July – Wilhelm Cuno, German politician (died 1933)
- 11 October – Karl Leopold von Möller, German politician, journalist and novelist (died 1943)
- 4 November – Marie Kreft, German politician (died 1963)
- 7 November – Adolf von Brauchitsch, German general (died 1935)
- 25 December – Adolf Windaus, German chemist (died 1959)
