= Georg Heinrich Busse =

German landscape painter and engraver

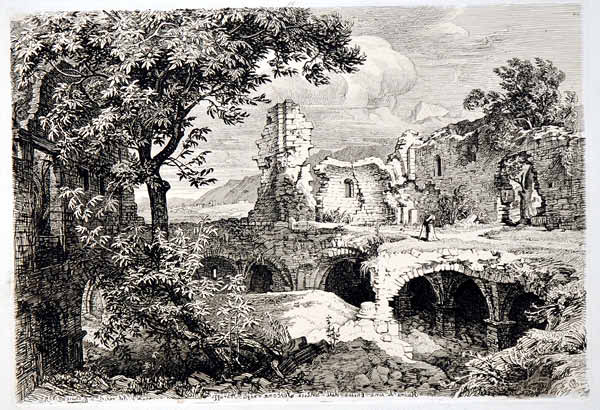
Ruins of a church of the ancient Forcona in the Abruzzo by Georg Heinrich Busse, 1839

Georg Heinrich Busse (17 July 1810 – 26 February 1868), a landscape painter and engraver, was born at Bennenmühlen, near Hanover. He studied drawing under Giesewell, and then proceeded, with royal assistance, to Dresden, where he learned engraving under Stolzel, and obtained the first prize for that art in 1834. For the next ten years, he studied from nature in Italy, influenced by the work of Nicolas Poussin, Claude, and Koch, visiting Greece, however, in 1843. On his return he was appointed engraver to the Hanoverian court and library, but pursued painting also from 1847. In 1858 he went on a tour of study through Paris to Algiers and Tunis, in the course of which he painted a large number of flowers. He died in Hanover in 1868. In addition to sixty plates of etchings, the following views are by him:

- Ruins of the Imperial Palace. 1850.
- Monte Aventino. 1852.
- Lago d'Agnano. 1857.
- The Ear of Dionysius. 1862.
- Lake Trasimene. 1863.
