= SS Thielbek =

A number of steamships have carried the name Thielbek, including:

- SS Thielbek (1926)
- SS Thielbek (1940)
