= 1805 in Germany =

- Decades: 1800s; 1810s; 1820s
- See also: Other events of 1805; History of Germany • Timeline • Years

Events from the year 1805 in Germany.

== Incumbents ==
=== Holy Roman Empire ===
- Francis II (5 July 1792 – 6 August 1806)

==== Important Electors ====
- Baden- Charles Frederick (27 April 1803 – 6 August 1806)
- Bavaria- Maximilian I (16 February 1799 – 6 August 1806)
- Saxony- Frederick Augustus I (17 December 1763 – 20 December 1806)
- Würzburg- Ferdinand III (25 December 1805 – 6 August 1806)
- Württemberg - Frederick I (1803 – 30 October 1816)

=== Kingdoms ===
- Kingdom of Prussia
  - Monarch – Frederick William III (16 November 1797 – 7 June 1840)

=== Grand Duchies ===
- Grand Duke of Mecklenburg-Schwerin
  - Frederick Francis I (24 April 1785 – 1 February 1837)
- Grand Duke of Mecklenburg-Strelitz
  - Charles II (2 June 1794 – 6 November 1816)
- Grand Duke of Oldenburg
  - Wilhelm (6 July 1785 – 2 July 1823) Due to mental illness, Wilhelm was duke in name only, with his cousin Peter, Prince-Bishop of Lübeck, acting as regent throughout his entire reign.
  - Peter I (2 July 1823 – 21 May 1829)
- Grand Duke of Saxe-Weimar
  - Karl August (1758–1809) Raised to grand duchy in 1809

=== Principalities ===
- Schaumburg-Lippe
  - George William (13 February 1787 – 1860)
- Schwarzburg-Rudolstadt
  - Louis Frederick II (13 April 1793 – 28 April 1807)
- Schwarzburg-Sondershausen
  - Günther Friedrich Karl I (14 October 1794 – 19 August 1835)
- Principality of Lippe
  - Leopold II (5 November 1802 – 1 January 1851)
- Principality of Reuss-Greiz
  - Heinrich XIII (28 June 1800 – 29 January 1817)
- Waldeck and Pyrmont
  - Friedrich Karl August (29 August 1763 – 24 September 1812)

=== Duchies ===
- Duke of Anhalt-Dessau
  - Leopold III (16 December 1751 – 9 August 1817)
- Duke of Saxe-Altenburg
  - Duke of Saxe-Hildburghausen (1780–1826) - Frederick
- Duke of Saxe-Coburg-Saalfeld
  - Francis (8 September 1800 – 9 December 1806)
- Duke of Saxe-Meiningen
  - Bernhard II (24 December 1803 – 20 September 1866)
- Duke of Schleswig-Holstein-Sonderburg-Beck
  - Frederick Charles Louis (24 February 1775 – 25 March 1816)

== Other ==
- Landgrave of Hesse-Darmstadt
  - Louis I (6 April 1790 – 14 August 1806)

== Events ==
- 7 April – Beethoven's Symphony No. 3, Eroica, has its public premiere at the Theater an der Wien in Vienna under his baton.
- 9 April - The first Weltsekttag to celebrate the resistance to Napoleon.
- 8 October – Battle of Wertingen
- 9 October – Battle of Günzburg
- 11 October – Battle of Haslach-Jungingen
- 14 October – Napoleonic Wars: War of the Third Coalition – Ulm Campaign: Battle of Elchingen – An Austrian corps under Johann von Riesch is defeated by Marshal Ney, near Elchingen, Bavaria.
- 16–19 October – War of the Third Coalition: Ulm Campaign – Battle of Ulm: Austrian General Mack von Leiberich is forced to surrender his entire army to Napoleon, after being surrounded.
- 3 November – Treaty of Potsdam
- 20 November – Beethoven's only opera Fidelio, in its original form (known retrospectively as Leonore), is premiered at the Theater an der Wien in Vienna, which at this time is under French military occupation.
- German Army surgeon Philipp Bozzini invents the lichtleiter, ancestor of the endoscope, for examination of bodily orifices.
- Grand Duchy of Würzburg is established.

== Births ==
- 27 January – Samuel Palmer, English artist (died 1881)
- 13 February – Peter Gustav Lejeune Dirichlet, German mathematician (died 1859)
- 8 April – Hugo von Mohl, German botanist (died 1872)

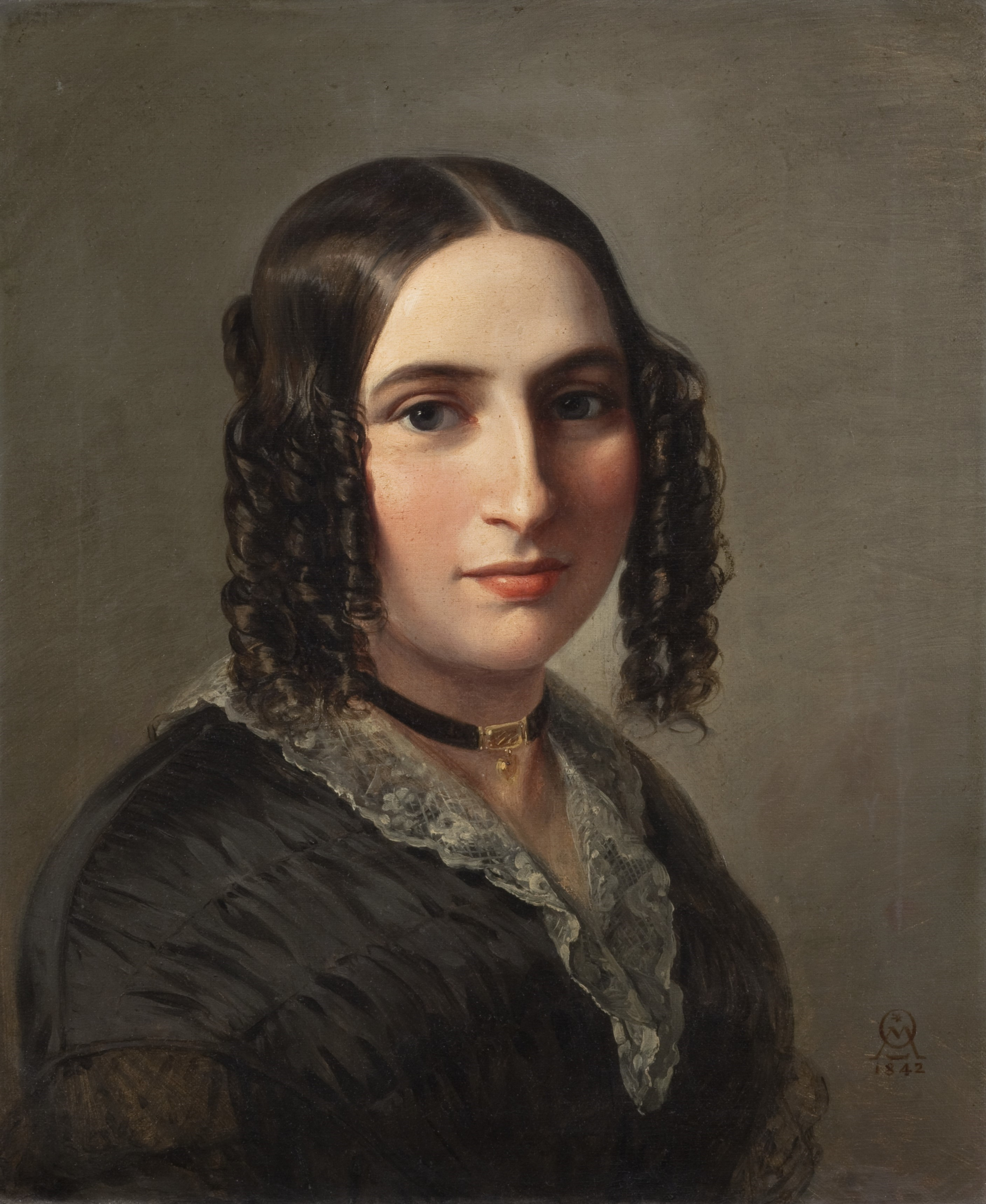
Fanny Mendelssohn

- 30 July – Rudolf Wagner, German anatomist, pathologist (died 1864)
- 27 September – George Müller, Prussian evangelist, founder of the New Orphan Houses, Ashley Down, Bristol in England (died 1898)
- 14 November – Fanny Mendelssohn, German composer, pianist (died 1847)

== Deaths ==
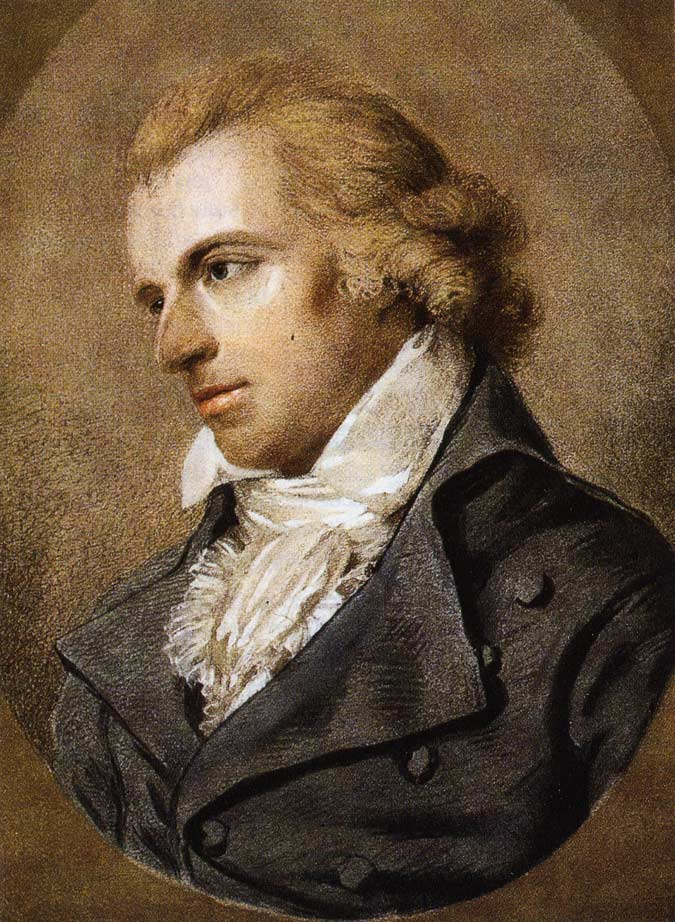
Friedrich Schiller

- 17 January – Paschen von Cossel, German lawyer (born 1714)
- 20 February – Justus Claproth, German jurist, inventor of the de-inking process of recycled paper (born 1728)
- 9 May – Friedrich Schiller, German playwright (born 1759)

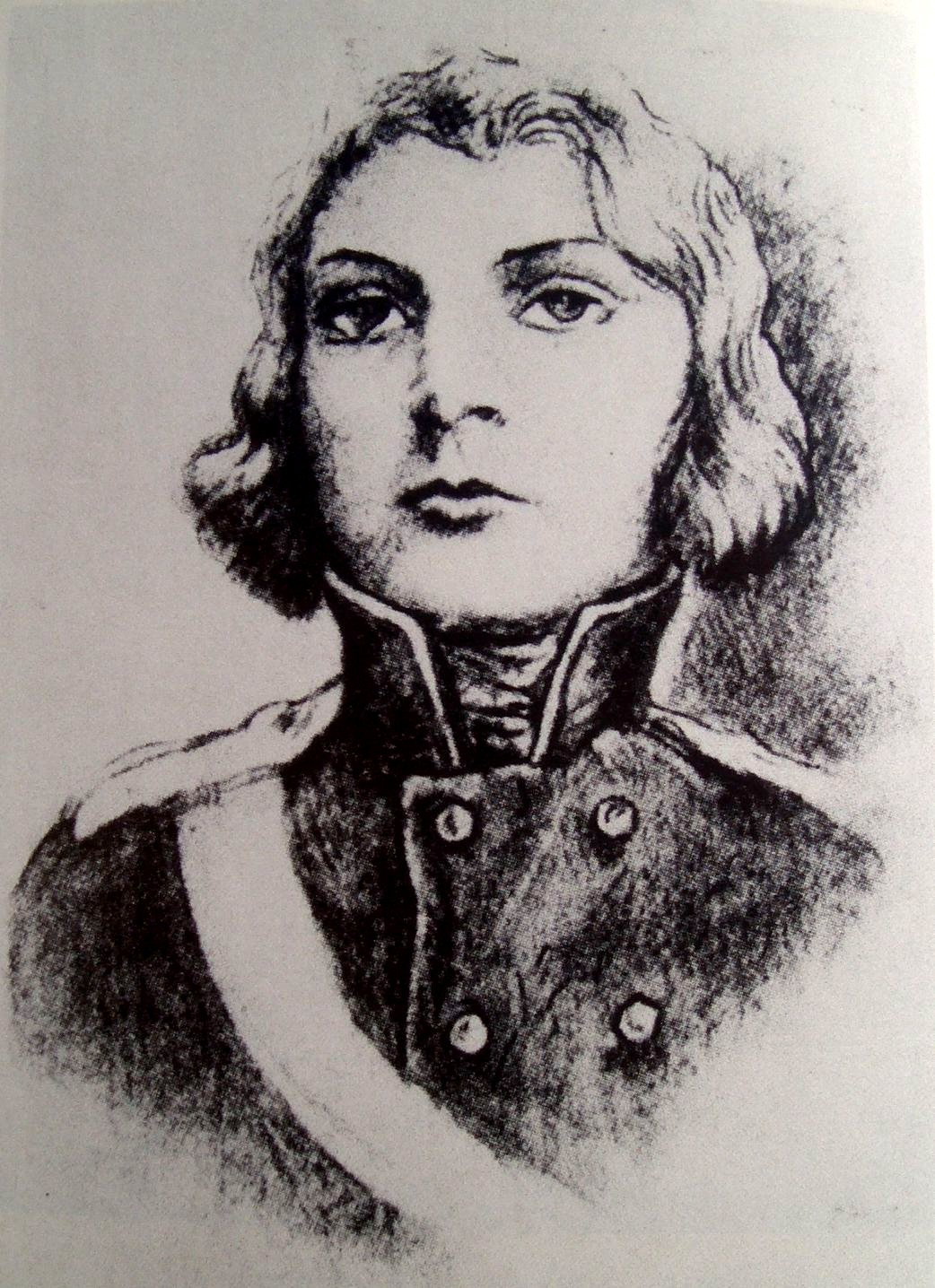
Eleonore Prochaska

- 5 October - Eleonore Prochaska, German heroine soldier (born 1785)
