= Carl Bergmann (politician) =

German banker and diplomat

Carl Bergmann (20 April 1874 in Sömmerda; died 26 September 1935 in Berlin) was a German banker and diplomat.

== Biography ==
After studying law, which he finished with the doctorate, he became in 1900 Gerichtsassessor in Berlin before he changed the following year to the Deutsche Bank. From this bank he was sent from 1901 to 1902 to Konstantinopel for the management of the Chemins de Fer Ottomans d'Anatolie. 1911 he was appointed deputy director of the Deutsche Bank. 1914-1918 he worked as a financial delegate at the German Embassy in The Hague.

After the end of World War I he was since 1919 representative of the German Reich in the reparations talks in Paris. In July 1919 he was next to Stephan Moesle undersecretary in the Finance Ministry and also chairman of the war load commission. He held until September 1921 these offices and was thus one of the closest collaborators of the Ministers of Finance Matthias Erzberger and Joseph Wirth.

He then returned to Deutsche Bank as a member of the board. From 1924 to 1927 he was co-owner of the bank Lazard Speyer-Ellissen in Frankfurt am Main. Even as a member of the board of the Reichsbahn he took part in the reparations negotiations in 1930. From 1931 until his death in 1935 he was the trustee of the Danatbank.

== Appreciation ==
In his book Réflexions sur le franc et sur quelques autres sujets [Thoughts about the franc and some other topics, Paris 1926] John Maynard Keynes remembers the German diplomats Bergmann and Schacht and writes about Bergmann:

Bergmann was the appointment of the Organizing Committee for Reparations in 1919 until the adoption of the Dawes Plan in 1924 constantly behind the scenes. He was one of the most excellent representatives of that man shock, which remains not sit on his gilded armchairs, but is linked friendly relations with the opposing camp, regardless of formalities.

The American historian Alfred C. Mierzejewski describes in his history of the Reichsbahn the continued efforts by Carl Bergman (as a longtime member of the management and the supervisory board of the Railway), not to let fall the Reichsbahn in the hands of the Nazis.

== Publications ==
- Der Weg der Reparation: Von Versailles über den Dawes-Plan zum Ziel. Frankfurter Societäts-Druckerei, Frankfurt am Main 1926.
- Der gegenwärtige Stand der Reparationsfrage, Vortrag gehalten am 23. Mai 1928 in der Jahreshauptversammlung des Verbandes Mitteldeutscher Industrieller e. V. Frankfurt am Main 1928. (Bundesarchiv)
- "Germany and the Young Plan". In: Foreign Affairs. Bd. 8, Juli 1930, S. 596 f.

== Sources ==
- Personal profile of Carl Bergmann in the EU Committee of the Regions's database of members
- Schattenblick: "bank crash and Brüning's emergency decrees - Part 2 (UZ)
- The Most Valuable Asset of the Reich, Alfred C. Mierzejewski, 1999 (Volume I)
- "Réflexions sur le franc et sur quelques autres sujets", John Maynard Keynes, 1926
- The Diplomats, 1919-1939. Gordon A. Craig & Felix Gilbert, Princeton, 1994, page 150
- "Ex-German Minister Visits Washington; Carlsberg Man Tells Mellon and Hoover of German Economic situation", The New York Times, November 4, 1921 (p. 19)
- "Business: Oversubscribed". Time. June 23, 1930.
- The Ruhr Crisis, 1923-1924, Conan Fischer, 2003 Oxford University Press USA; Page 182: The End of Passive Resistance

]
