= Hans Winkler =

German botanist (1877–1945)

Hans Karl Albert Winkler (23 April 1877 in Oschatz – 22 November 1945 in Wachwitz, Dresden) was a German botanist. From 1912 on, he was Professor of Botany at the University of Hamburg, and a director of that university's Institute of Botany. Winkler coined the term 'heteroploidy' in 1916. He is remembered for coining the term 'genome' in 1920, by making a portmanteau of the words gene and chromosome. He wrote:

Ich schlage vor, für den haploiden Chromosomensatz, der im Verein mit dem zugehörigen Protoplasma die materielle Grundlage der systematischen Einheit darstellt den Ausdruck: das Genom zu verwenden ...

This may be translated as: "I propose the expression Genom for the haploid chromosome set, which, together with the pertinent protoplasm, specifies the material foundations of the species ..." Among his experiments was the discovery of chimeras (also chimaeras) by grafting a black Nightshade and tomato plant and observing a shoot which displayed characteristics of both plants.

Winkler also worked at the University of Naples, in Italy, where he researched the physiology of the alga Bryopsis.

In 1903/04, he traveled around the world, visiting Ceylon, Java, Australia, New Zealand, Samoa and North America and later Borneo in 1924/25.

Apomixis, the process of asexual reproduction through seed without fertilization, was coined and defined by Hans Winkler in 1908.

He joined the NSDAP in 1937.

== Works ==
- "Solanum Tubingense, ein echter Pfropfbastard zwischen Tomate und Nachtschatten". Bericht der Deutschen Botanik Gesellschaft (26a). 1908.
- "Verbreitung und Ursache der Parthenogenesis im Pflanzen- und Tierreiche. 1920 – via Biodiversity Heritage Library.
- "Experimentelle Erzeugung von Pflanzen mit abweichenden Chromosomenzahlen". Zeitschrift für Botanik (8). 1916.
- "Die Konversion der Gene" (1930)
