= 1804 in Germany =

- Decades: 1800s; 1810s; 1820s
- See also: Other events of 1804; History of Germany • Timeline • Years

Events from the year 1804 in Germany.

== Incumbents ==
=== Holy Roman Empire ===
- Francis II (5 July 1792 – 6 August 1806)

==== Important Electors ====
- Baden- Charles Frederick (27 April 1803 – 6 August 1806)
- Bavaria- Maximilian I (16 February 1799 – 6 August 1806)
- Saxony- Frederick Augustus I (17 December 1763 – 20 December 1806)
- Württemberg - Frederick I (1803 – 30 October 1816)

=== Kingdoms ===
- Kingdom of Prussia
  - Monarch – Frederick William III (16 November 1797 – 7 June 1840)

=== Grand Duchies ===
- Grand Duke of Mecklenburg-Schwerin
  - Frederick Francis I (24 April 1785 – 1 February 1837)
- Grand Duke of Mecklenburg-Strelitz
  - Charles II (2 June 1794 – 6 November 1816)
- Grand Duke of Oldenburg
  - Wilhelm (6 July 1785 – 2 July 1823) Due to mental illness, Wilhelm was duke in name only, with his cousin Peter, Prince-Bishop of Lübeck, acting as regent throughout his entire reign.
  - Peter I (2 July 1823 – 21 May 1829)
- Grand Duke of Saxe-Weimar
  - Karl August (1758–1809) Raised to grand duchy in 1809

=== Principalities ===
- Schaumburg-Lippe
  - George William (13 February 1787 – 1860)
- Schwarzburg-Rudolstadt
  - Louis Frederick II (13 April 1793 – 28 April 1807)
- Schwarzburg-Sondershausen
  - Günther Friedrich Karl I (14 October 1794 – 19 August 1835)
- Principality of Lippe
  - Leopold II (5 November 1802 – 1 January 1851)
- Principality of Reuss-Greiz
  - Heinrich XIII (28 June 1800 – 29 January 1817)
- Waldeck and Pyrmont
  - Friedrich Karl August (29 August 1763 – 24 September 1812)

=== Duchies ===
- Duke of Anhalt-Dessau
  - Leopold III (16 December 1751 – 9 August 1817)
- Duke of Saxe-Altenburg
  - Duke of Saxe-Hildburghausen (1780–1826) - Frederick
- Duke of Saxe-Coburg-Saalfeld
  - Francis (8 September 1800 – 9 December 1806)
- Duke of Saxe-Meiningen
  - Bernhard II (24 December 1803 – 20 September 1866)
- Duke of Schleswig-Holstein-Sonderburg-Beck
  - Frederick Charles Louis (24 February 1775 – 25 March 1816)

=== Other ===
- Landgrave of Hesse-Darmstadt
  - Louis I (6 April 1790 – 14 August 1806)

== Events ==
- 17 March – Friedrich Schiller's play Wilhelm Tell, is first performed at Weimar, under the direction of Johann Wolfgang von Goethe.
- 9 June – Beethoven's Symphony No. 3 in E–flat premiered in Vienna.
- 11 August – In reaction to Napoleon being proclaimed emperor of France, Francis II assumes the title of a hereditary emperor of Austria (as Francis I) in addition to his title as emperor of the Holy Roman Empire. Tis latter title will become obsolete two years later when the formation of the Confederation of the Rhine instigated by Napoleon signals the end of the Holy Roman Empire.
- 1 September – German astronomer K. L. Harding discovers the asteroid Juno.
- German pharmacist Friedrich Sertürner first isolates morphine from opium, probably the first ever isolation of a natural plant alkaloid.
- German Gerhard Bonnier begins a publishing business in Copenhagen (Denmark) by issuing Underfulde og sandfærdige kriminalhistorier, origin of the Swedish Bonnier Group.

== Births ==
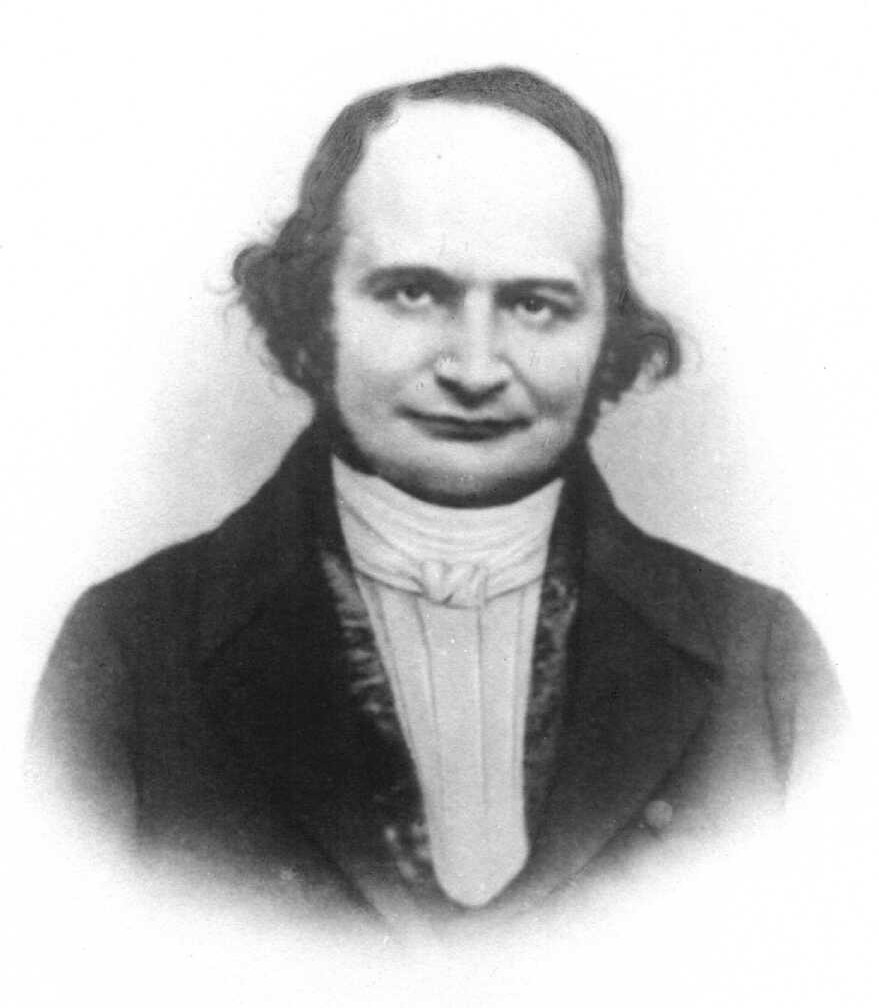
Carl Gustav Jacob Jacobi

- 12 February – Heinrich Lenz, Russian-born Baltic German physicist (died 1865)
- 5 April – Matthias Schleiden, German botanist (died 1881)
- 5 June – Robert Schomburgk, German-born explorer (died 1865)
- 28 July – Ludwig Feuerbach, German philosopher (died 1872)
- 8 September – Eduard Mörike, German poet (died 1875)
- 24 October – Wilhelm Eduard Weber, German physicist (died 1891)
- 10 December – Carl Gustav Jacob Jacobi, German mathematician (died 1851)

== Deaths ==
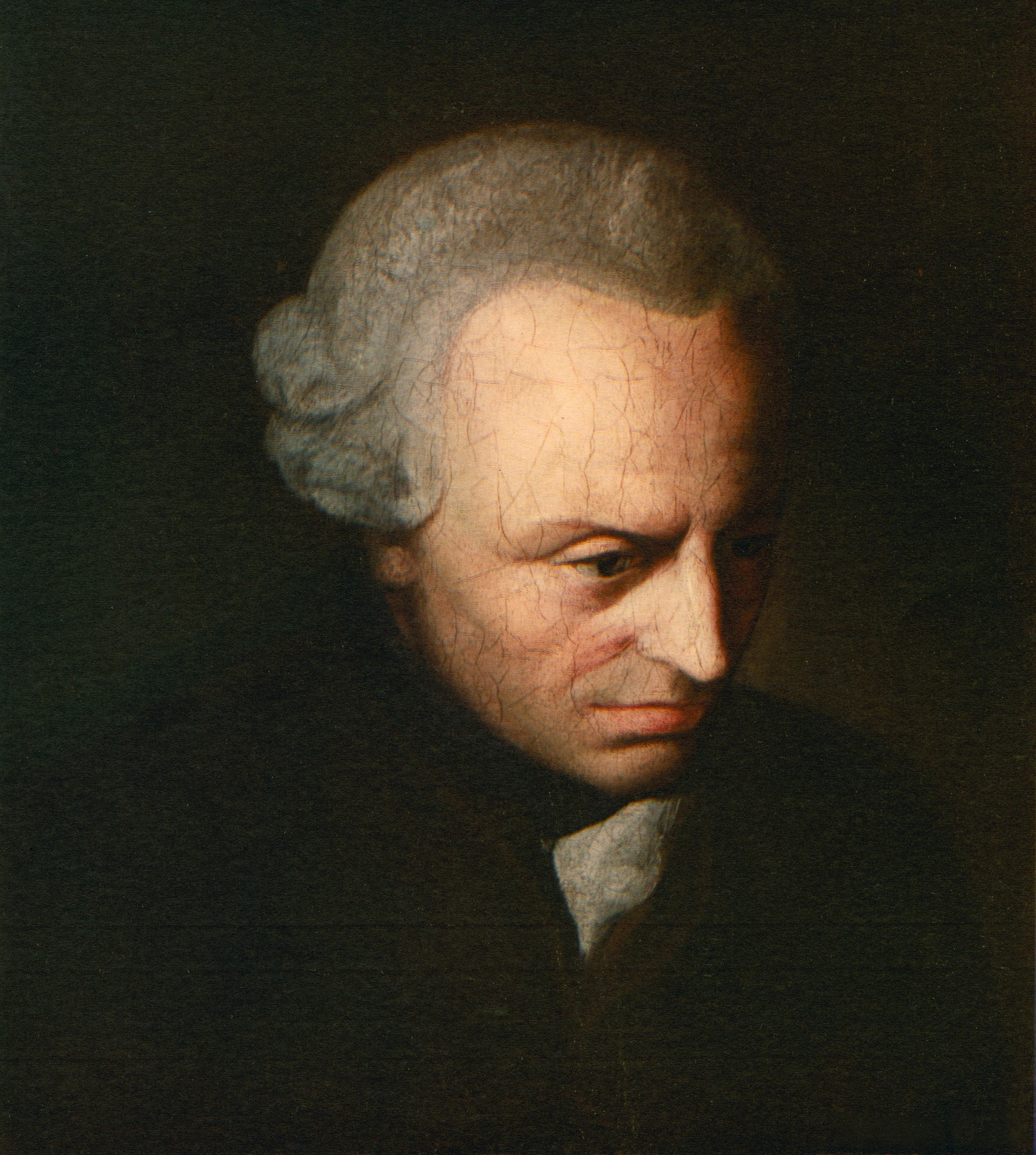
Immanuel Kant

- 12 February – Immanuel Kant, German philosopher (born 1724)
- 25 May – Johann Joachim Spalding, German theologian (born 1714)
- 1 November – Johann Friedrich Gmelin, German naturalist (born 1748)
- 5 November – August Friedrich Oelenhainz, German painter (born 1745)
- 9 December – Wilhelm Abraham Teller, German theologian (born 1734)
- unknown date – Peter Haas, German-Danish engraver (born 1754)
