= 1956 in Germany =

- Decades: 1930s; 1940s; 1950s; 1960s; 1970s
- See also: Other events of 1956; History of Germany • Timeline • Years

Events in the year 1956 in Germany.

== Incumbents ==
- President – Theodor Heuss
- Chancellor – Konrad Adenauer
- Second Adenauer cabinet

== Events ==
- May 1 - Germany in the Eurovision Song Contest 1956
- June 22 - July 3 - 6th Berlin International Film Festival
- July 25 - the Wehrpflichtgesetz (Conscription law) starts
- October 27 - Saar Treaty

== Births ==
- 5 January - Frank-Walter Steinmeier, politician
- 7 January
  - Leonard Lansink, actor
  - Uwe Ochsenknecht, actor
- 21 January - Jürgen Kehrer, author
- 16 February - Bodo Ramelow, politician
- 25 February - Michel Friedman, lawyer, politician and talk show host
- 27 February - Rosemarie Gabriel, swimmer
- 28 March - Evelin Jahl, discus thrower
- 20 March - Theo Breuer, poet, essayist, editor, translator and publisher
- 12 April - Herbert Grönemeyer, singer
- 4 May - Ulrike Meyfarth, high jumper
- 18 May - Lothar Thoms, German track cyclist (died 2017)
- 31 May - Fritz Hilpert, German musician
- 1 June – Petra Morsbach, German author
- 3 June - Thomas Flach, German sailor
- 6 June - Hans-Peter Ferner, German athlete
- 8 June - Udo Bullmann, German politician
- 3 July - Gerhard Trabert, German politician
- 4 July - Bettina Böttinger, television presenter
- 13 July - Günter Jauch, television presenter and journalist
- 24 July
  - Carmen Nebel, television presenter
  - Hubertus Meyer-Burckhardt, journalist
- 1 August - Axel Milberg, actor
- 12 August - Brigitte Kraus, athlete
- 18 August - Rainer Woelki, bishop of Roman Catholic Church
- 24 August - Nina Ruge, journalist and television presenter
- 21 September - Joachim Herrmann, politician
- 24 September - Ilona Slupianek, shot putter
- 26 September - Jutta Allmendinger, social scientist
- 30 September - Désirée Nick, actress and comedian
- 3 October - Ralph Morgenstern, actor
- 6 October - Rüdiger Helm, canoeist
- 15 November - Edgar Hartung, canoeist
- 20 November - Olli Dittrich, actor and comedian
- 23 November - Karin Guthke, Olympic diver
- 28 November - Michael Eissenhauer, art historian
- 30 November - Heinz Rudolf Kunze, singer
- 5 December - Klaus Allofs, football player
- 5 December - Bettina Gaus, journalist (d. 2021)
- 9 December - Henriette Reker, politician

== Deaths ==
- 1 January — Ludwig Dürr, German airship designer (born 1878)
- 3 January — Joseph Wirth, German politician, Chancellor of Germany (born 1879)
- 13 January — Lyonel Feininger, German painter (born 1871)
- 7 February - Karl Schelenz, German sport teacher (born 1890)
- 20 February — Heinrich Barkhausen, German physicist (born 1881)
- 26 February — Rudolf Kanzler, surveyor and politician (born 1873)
- 21 March - Hans Müller-Schlösser, German playwright (born 1884)
- 13 April — Emil Nolde, German painter (born 1867)
- 16 April — Richard Kolkwitz, German botanist (born 1873)
- 29 April - Wilhelm Ritter von Leeb, German field marshal (born 1876)
- 10 May - F.W. Schröder-Schrom, German actor (born 1879)
- 22 May - Walther Kossel, German physicist (born 1888)
- 29 May — Hermann Abendroth, German conductor (born 1883)
- 8 June - Hans Meiser, German Protestant theologian, pastor and first 'Landesbischof' of the Evangelical Lutheran Church in Bavaria (born 1881)
- 17 June – Paul Rostock, German surgeon (born 1892)
- 7 July — Gottfried Benn, German poet and essayist (born 1886)
- 14 August:
  - Bertolt Brecht, German writer (born 1898)
  - Konstantin von Neurath, German diplomat and Nazi party chancellor (born 1873)
- 21 August - Wilhelm Weskamm, German bishop of Roman Catholic Church (born 1891)
- 12 September - Hans Carossa, German novelist (born 1878)
- 13 October - Robert Lehr, German politician (born 1883)
- 2 November - Leo Baeck, German rabbi (born 1873)
- 13 November - Werner Haas, German motorcycle racer (born 1927)
- 15 November – Emma Richter, German paleontologist (born 1888)
- 25 December — Robert Walser, German writer (born 1878)

== See also ==
- 1956 in German television
