= Ochsenknecht =

Ochsenknecht is a surname. Notable people with the surname include:

- Cheyenne Ochsenknecht (born 2000), German model and child actress
- Jimi Blue Ochsenknecht (born 1991), German actor and singer
- Natascha Ochsenknecht (born 1964), German actress
- Uwe Ochsenknecht (born 1956), German actor and singer
- Wilson Gonzalez Ochsenknecht (born 1990), German actor
