= Emilia Schüle =

German actress (born 1992)

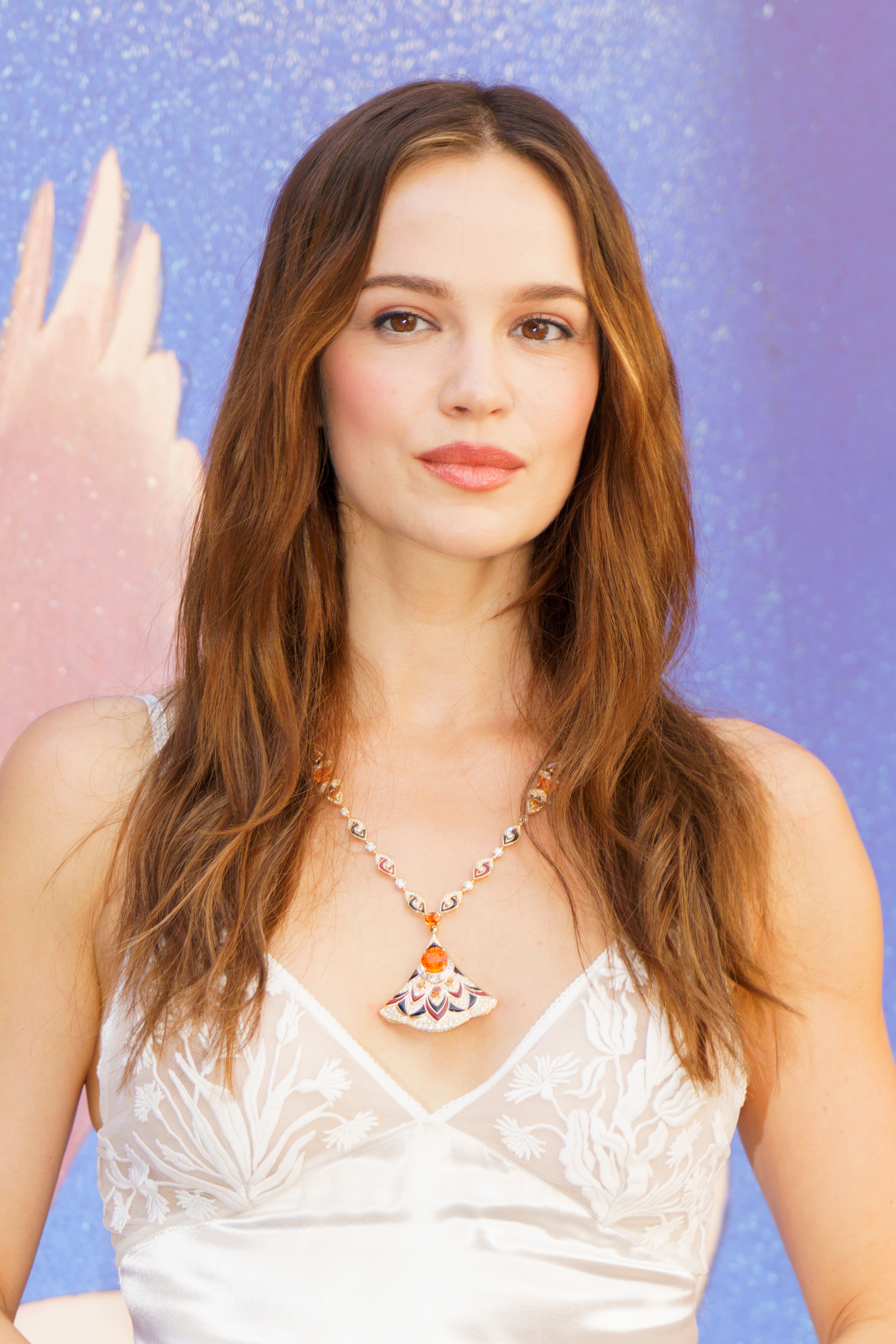
- Schüle in 2026
- Born: Emilia Schüle; 28 November 1992 (age 33); Blagoveshchensk, Russia
- Citizenship: German
- Occupation: Actress
- Years active: 2005–present

Emilia Schüle (born 28 November 1992) is a German actress. She is best known for playing the titular role in the TV series Marie Antoinette (2022–present).

== Early life ==
Emilia Schüle was born in Blagoveshchensk, Russia, in 1992, to a Russian-German family. When she was one year old, she moved to Berlin with her parents. She took professional dance classes in modern dance, street dance and ballet when she was eight years old.

After she participated in the workshop Talents Getting Started in 2005, she appeared in several commercials for Arcor, IKEA, Clearasil and Deutsche Telekom.

== Career ==
She started appearing in television movies Guten Morgen, Herr Grothe and Manatu where she got her first leading roles, she had her film breakthrough in 2008, when she starred next to Anke Engelke, Armin Rohde and Piet Klocke in the movie Freche Mädchen.

Her next major role was in 2009 in the movie Gangs as Sophie, alongside the young actors and brothers, Wilson Gonzalez and Jimi Blue Ochsenknecht. In 2010 she appeared in Rock It! and Freche Mädchen 2.

In September 2021, Schüle was announced to play Marie Antoinette in the Canal+ and BBC series of the same name created by Deborah Davis.

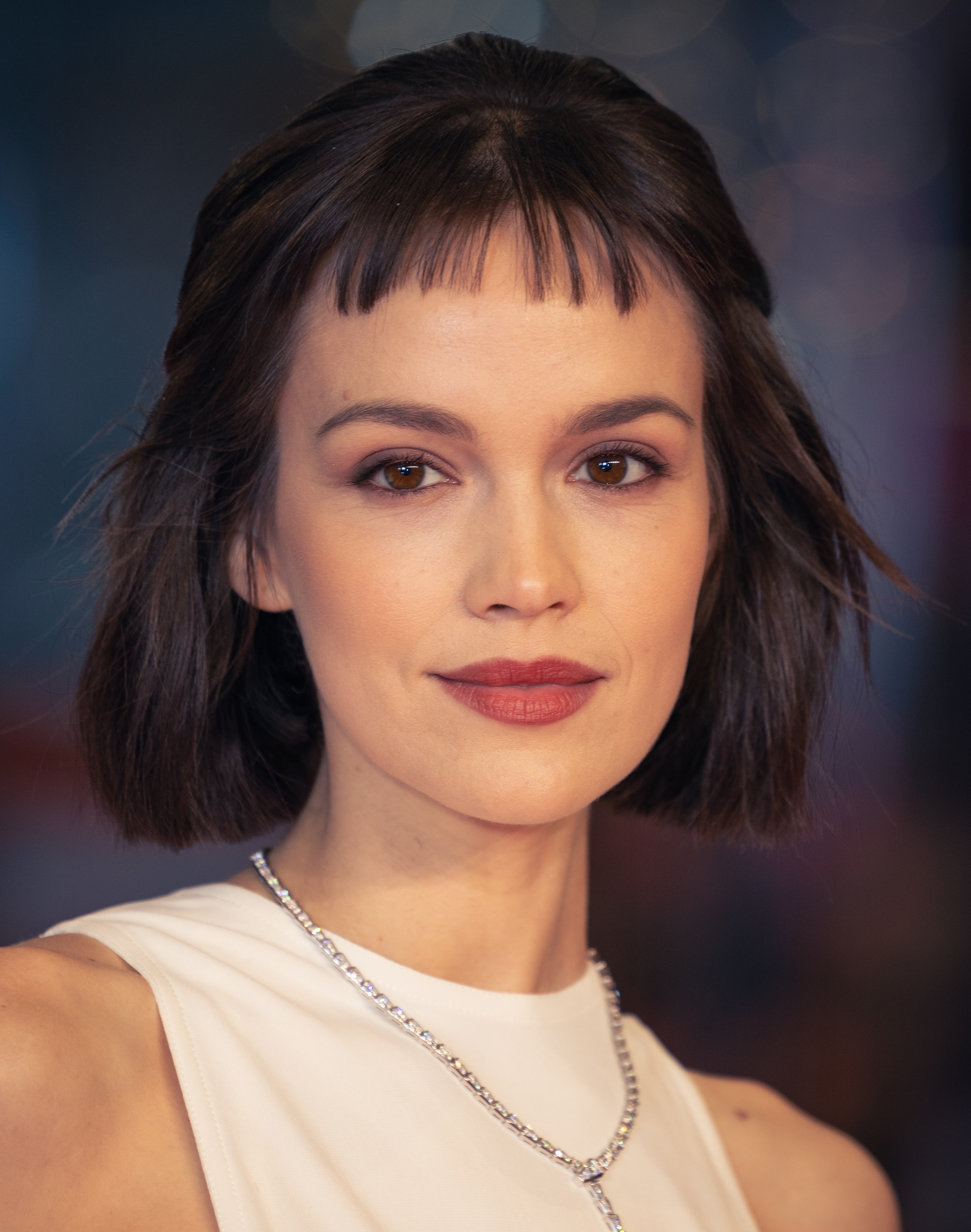
Schüle in 2025

== Filmography ==
- 2005: Nichts weiter als (short film)
- 2006: Guten Morgen, Herr Grothe (TV film)
- 2007: Manatu (TV film)
- 2008: Freche Mädchen
- 2008: Brüderchen und Schwesterchen (TV film)
- 2008: Lucky Fritz
- 2009: Meine wunderbare Familie (TV series, 2 episodes)
- 2009: 4 Yoginis
- 2009: Gangs
- 2009: Factor 8 (TV film)
- 2010: Rock It!
- 2010: Freche Mädchen 2
- 2010: Aschenputtel (TV film)
- 2011: Vanished (TV film)
- 2011: Isenhart: The Hunt Is on for Your Soul (TV film)
- 2012: Nemez
- 2012–2014: Add a Friend (TV series, 28 episodes)
- 2013: Heroes (TV film)
- 2013: Striving for Freedom (TV film)
- 2015: Punk Berlin 1982, as Sanja
- 2015: Boy 7
- 2015: Berlin One
- 2016: LenaLove, as Lena
- 2016: Point Blank
- 2016: Ku'damm 56 (TV miniseries)
- 2017: Charité (TV series, 6 episodes), as Hedwig Freiberg
- 2017: High Society, as Anabel von Schlacht
- 2017: Berlin Station (TV series, 8 episodes), as Lena Ganz
- 2017: Simpel
- 2017: Es war einmal Indianerland
- 2017: Prof. Wall im Bordell
- 2018: Ku'damm 59 (TV miniseries)
- 2018: Axel der Held
- 2019: Treadstone (TV series)
- 2019: Prof. Wall im Bordell
- 2019: Traumfabrik
- 2020: Narcissus and Goldmund, as Lydia
- 2021: Ku'damm 63 (TV miniseries)
- 2021: Die Vergesslichkeit der Eichhörnchen
- 2022: Wunderschön, as Julie Abeck
- 2022–present: Marie Antoinette (TV series)
- 2025: Wunderschöner, as Julie Abeck
- 2026: Trial of Hein (Der Heimatlose), as Greta
- 2026: The Girl with the Leica, as Gerda Taro

== Awards and nominations ==
Year	Award	Category	Nominated work	Result	Ref.
2008	Undine Award	Best Young Actress - Film	Freche Mädchen	Nominated	
2010	New Faces Award	Best Young Actress	Rock It!	Nominated	
2013	Günter Strack TV Award	Best Young Actress	Crime Scene (Episode "Wegwerfmädchen")	Nominated	
2014	Goldene Kamera	Best Young Actress	Crime Scene (Episodes "Wegwerfmädchen" + "Das goldene Band")	Won	
