= Cheyenne Ochsenknecht =

German model

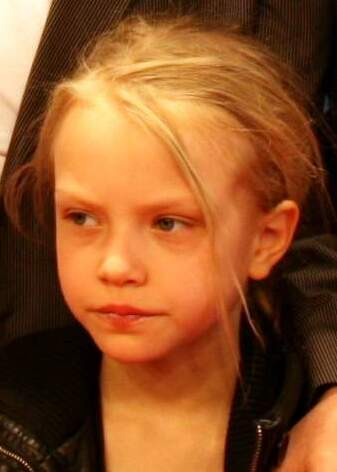
- Ochsenknecht in 2008
- Born: Cheyenne Savannah Ochsenknecht; 13 January 2000 (age 26); Munich, Germany
- Occupations: Model, actress
- Years active: 2005–present
- Children: 2
- Modeling information
- Height: 1.78 m (5 ft 10 in)
- Hair color: Blonde
- Eye color: Green

Cheyenne Savannah Ochsenknecht (born 13 January 2000) is a German model and former child actress.

== Early life and family ==
Cheyenne Ochsenknecht was born in Munich, Germany, to actor Uwe Ochsenknecht and model Natascha Ochsenknecht. She has two older brothers, actors Wilson Gonzalez and Jimi Blue, and a half-brother, actor Rocco Stark. Growing up in a family prominent in the entertainment industry, she was exposed to acting and modeling from an early age.

== Career ==
At the age of five, Cheyenne made her acting debut in the film The Wild Soccer Bunch 2 (2005), appearing alongside her brothers. She transitioned to modeling at 16, debuting at the Berlin Fashion Week for the label Riani.In 2016, she appeared on the cover of the German edition of Grazia magazine.The following year, she walked the runway at Paris Fashion Week.

In 2018, Cheyenne appeared in the television series Just Push Abuba, portraying an "Instagram-Girl." She participated in the VOX show Promi Shopping Queen and the documentary series 7 Töchter in 2019, where she discussed her experiences growing up in the public eye. In 2022, she competed in the 15th season of Let's Dance, the German version of Dancing with the Stars, partnering with Evgeny Vinokurov; they were eliminated in the second episode.

== Personal life ==
Since 2019, Cheyenne has been in a relationship with Austrian farmer Nino Sifkovits. The couple married in 2022 and have two children: a daughter born in 2021 and a son in 2023. They reside on a farm in Styria, Austria, where they manage a cattle breeding business.

== Filmography ==
- The Wild Soccer Bunch 2 (2005) – Film
- Just Push Abuba (2018) – TV Series
- Promi Shopping Queen (2019) – TV Show
- 7 Töchter (2019) – Documentary Series
- Let's Dance (2022) – TV Show
- Diese Ochsenknechts (2022–present) – Docu-Soap
- Unser Hof – Mit Cheyenne und Nino (2023) – Docu-Soap
