= Diet Sayler =

German painter and sculptor (born 1939)

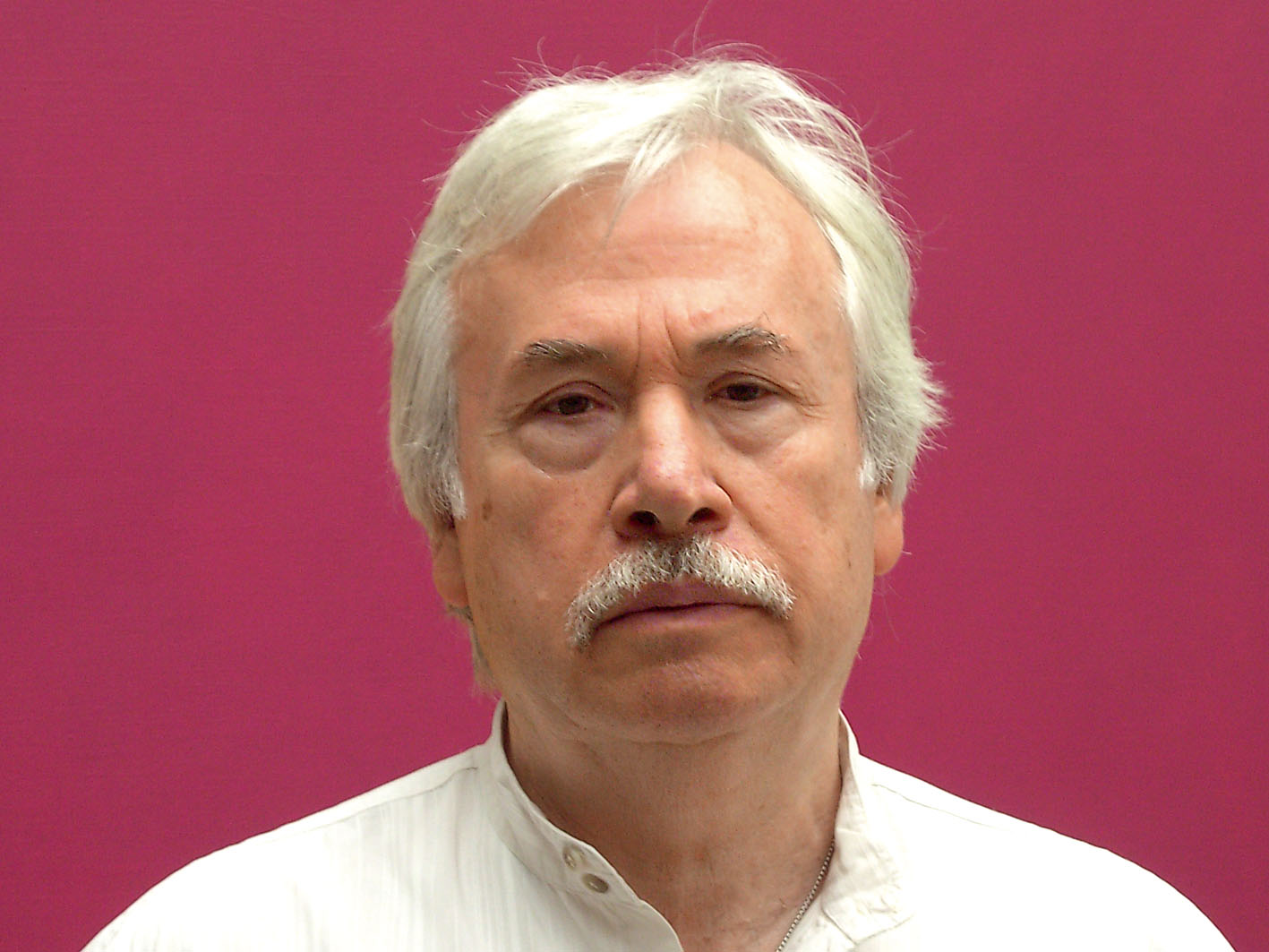
- Diet Sayler
- Born: 15 December 1939 (age 86); Timișoara, Romania
- Education: Technical University of Timișoara
- Known for: Painter
- Movement: Constructive art
- Awards: Camille Graeser

Diet Sayler (born 15 December 1939) is a German painter and sculptor.

== Education, early work ==
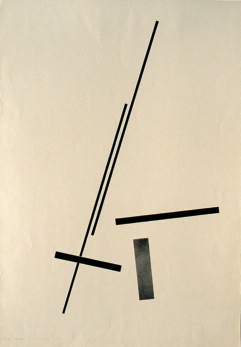
AK59 1969, oil on paper, Museum of Modern Art, New York

Diet Sayler was born on 15 December 1939 in Timișoara, Romania. He studied Structural Engineering at the Technical University of Timișoara (1956–1961) and Painting under Julius Podlipny. In the early 1960s he created an abstract painting that was subsequently defamed as Western and decadent and excluded from all exhibitions. It was not until 1968, during the Prague Spring, that the exhibition "5 young artists" (Bertalan, Cotosman, Flondor, Molnar and Sayler) in Galeria Kalinderu in Bucharest showed abstract-constructive art in Romania for the first time. That was the breakthrough. Sayler moved to Bucharest and was able to exhibit abroad, but he was not allowed to travel. In 1971 the political climate changed. The spring of reforms in Bucharest came to an end, and afterwards Sayler's works could no longer be shown. Sayler gave several interviews in the foreign press and as a result became very isolated.

== Emigration and international exhibitions ==
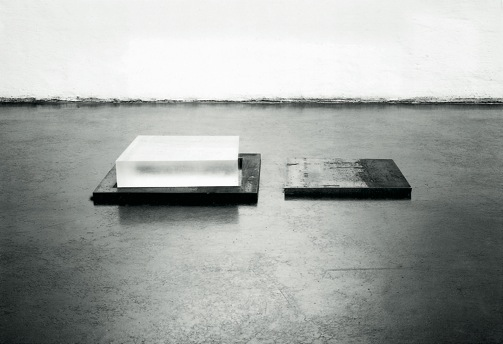
Bodenplastik 1982, acrylic glass and steel, 96,4 x 48,2 x 10,2 cm

On emigrating to Germany in 1973, Sayler moved the center of his work and life to Nuremberg, where from 1976 onwards he also worked as a lecturer alongside continuing his artistic work. In 1975 he showed his works at the Grand Palais in Paris for the first time. Solo shows followed at Galerie Grare in Paris, Galerie Hermanns in Munich, later at Galleria Lorenzelli in Milan, and at Galeria Edurne in Madrid. He now presented his work in many West European nations as well as in Brazil, Japan and the United States. In 1990, following the fall of the Iron Curtain, retrospectives of Diet Sayler were also shown in Eastern Europe, at the Czech Museum in Prague, Vasarely Museum in Budapest and the National Museum in Bucharest. The "konkret" exhibition series in Nuremberg (1980 to 1990), which Sayler directed, received international acclaim. Around 100 artists took part, including Dan Flavin, Ellsworth Kelly, Kenneth Martin, Vera Molnár, François Morellet, Aurélie Nemours, Mario Nigro, Leon Polk Smith and Jesús Rafael Soto. In 1988 Sayler curated the German-French exhibition "Construction and Conception" in Berlin. That same year he received the Camille Graeser Prize in Zurich. Alongside the exhibitions of paintings, prints, sculpture and photography, a series of site-specific installations was also held, in Galerie Grare, Paris; Palazzo Ducale, Genoa; East West Gallery, New York; St. Peter's, Cambridge; Gallery A, London; Ely Cathedral, Ely; University Gallery, Plzeň, Czech Republic; MUWA, Graz, Austria; Museo CAMEC, La Spezia, Italy.

== Teaching ==
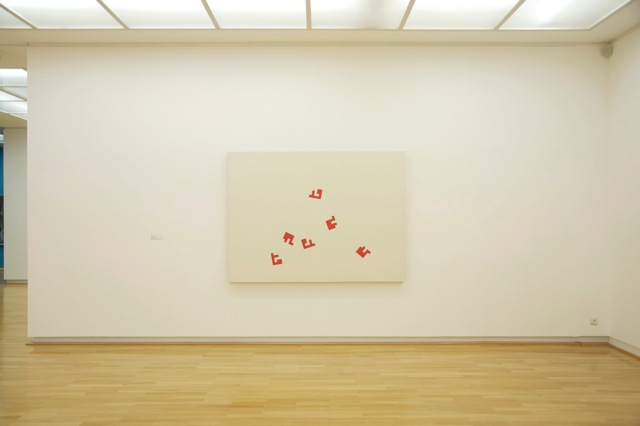
Wurfstück 1995, Kunstforum Ostdeutsche Galerie, Regensburg

From 1992 to 2005 Diet Sayler was a professor of painting at the Academy of Fine Arts, Nuremberg. In 1995 he worked as a guest professor at the Statens Kunstakademi in Oslo. As professor emeritus he was appointed 2006 director of the XIII International Summer Academy in Plauen.

== Work ==
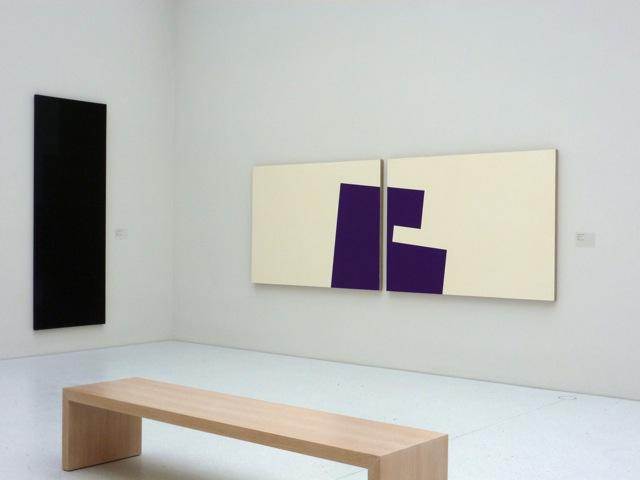
Malatesta 2002, Dyptichon, Neue Galerie Kassel

The young Diet Sayler was a great fan of Brâncuși and Malevich. At the start of his career he was above all inspired by Suprematism and Russian Revolution art. He studied the theories and works of the De Stijl and Bauhaus artists. Later he borrowed from Dadaism the principle of chance, on which his own works are based. Sayler arrived at Concrete art by opposing political reality and the doctrine of socialist realism. The drive for change is a central theme in his work. Sayler's early works are highly colorful. In the years of rejection and opposition color disappeared from his work, which became black and white. Following the culture shock of emigration he concentrated on thin lines on white canvases. Towards the end of the 1980s Sayler developed a system of basic elements, which became a repertoire of his painting. Color returned. He produced his ‘Paintings Pieces’, ‘Bivalences’ and ‘Throw Pieces’. The late 1990s saw the creation of wall pieces or ‘Bodies’ and Engrams (‘Norigrammes’) as site-specific installations in the urban architecture. Parallel to this he developed site-specific "Fugues" for the rooms of museums, churches or galleries.

== Notable collections ==
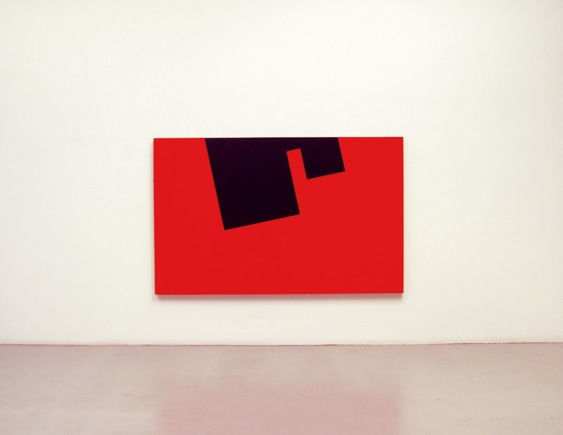
Duccio 2004, Museum Ritter, Waldenbuch

- Albertina, Vienna
- Birmingham Museum and Art Gallery, Birmingham
- Museum of Modern Art, New York City
- Museum of Grenoble, Grenoble
- Kunstmuseum Bayreuth, Bayreuth
- Museum für Konkrete Kunst, Ingolstadt
- New Gallery, Kassel
- Wilhelm Hack Museum, Ludwigshafen
- Neues Museum Nürnberg, Nuremberg
- Kunstforum Ostdeutsche Galerie, Regensburg
- Museum Ritter, Waldenbuch
- Museum im Kulturspeicher, Würzburg
- National Museum of Art of Romania, Bucharest
- Muzeul de Artă Timișoara, Timișoara
- Museum of Modern Art, Rio de Janeiro, Rio de Janeiro

== Exhibitions – selected, since 2000 ==
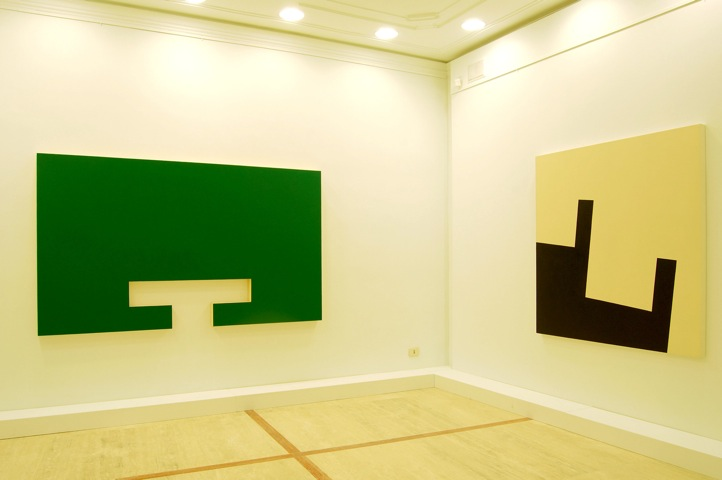
One Man Show, fortunaarte, Messina, 2008

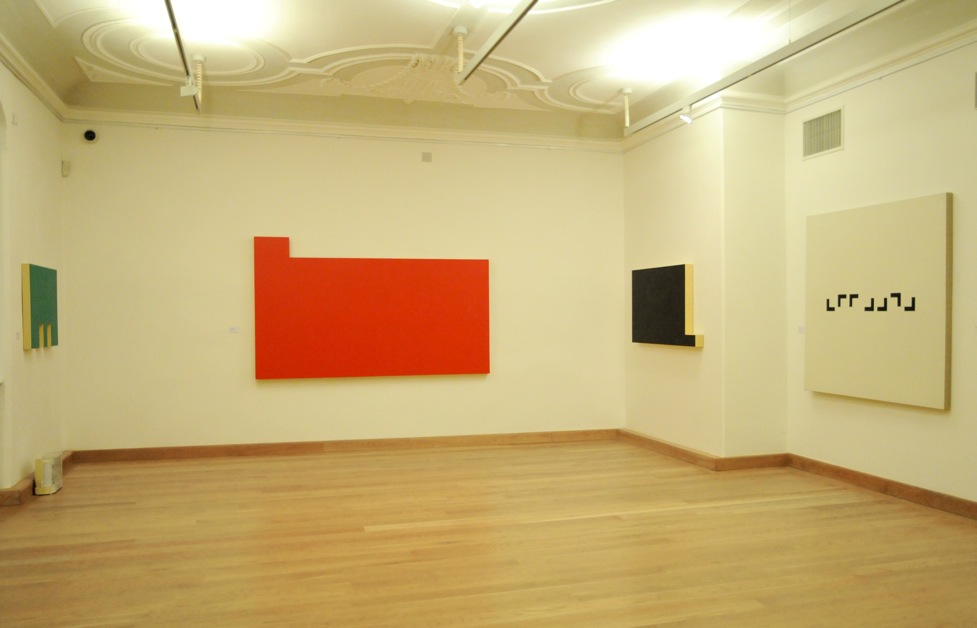
One Man Show, Kunstmuseum Bayreuth, 2009

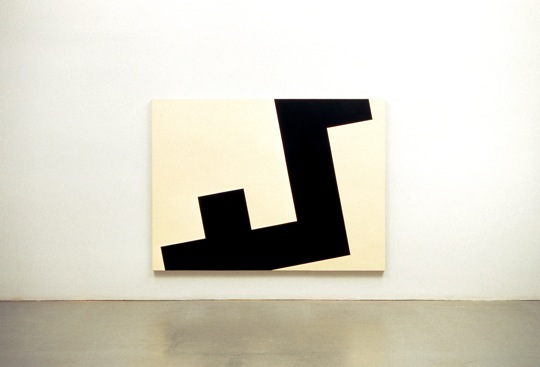
Teodosio 2002, acrylic on canvas, private collection Nuremberg

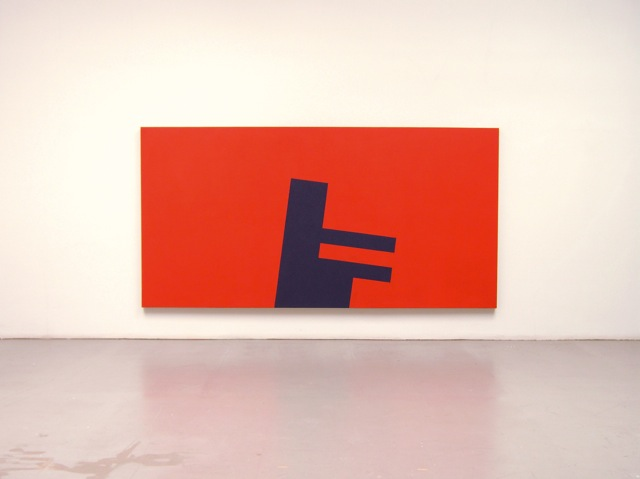
Gargano 2005, acrylic on canvas, 147 x 287 cm

- 2013
  - Diet Sayler: Die Realität der Poesie. Neues Museum Nürnberg
  - Neue Galerie – neu gesehen. Neue Galerie, Kassel
  - Structure & Energie. The Need for Abstraction. 418 Gallery, Bucharest
- 2012
  - Chance as Strategy. Vasarely Muzeum, Budapest
  - Ornamentale Strukturen. Kunstverein Pforzheim
  - Künstler aus Rumänien im Ausland. Galerie Emilia Suciu, Ettlingen
- 2011
  - Schöne Aussichten. Wiedereröffnung der Neuen Galerie. Neue Galerie, Kassel.
  - Ornament – Seriality. Vasarely Museum Budapest.
  - De lineas, formas, medidas, color y materia. Galeria Edurne, Madrid.
  - Diet Sayler: Norigramme. Muzeul de Arta, Timișoara.
  - Ornamental Structures. Stadtgalerie Saarbrücken.
- 2010
  - Diet Sayler: Fuga ligure. Museo CAMeC, La Spezia.
  - Diet Sayler: Fuge. Museum der Wahrnehmung, Graz.
  - Couleur & Geometrie. Actualité de l'art construit européen. Musées de Sens.
  - Die Neue Galerie – Auftritt im Schloss Neue Galerie, Kassel.
  - Twentysix Gasoline Stations Ed Altri Libri DArtista. Museo Regionale di Messina.
- 2009
  - Diet Sayler: Malerei lügt nicht. Kunstmuseum Bayreuth.
  - L'oblique. Musée du Chateau de Montbéliard.
  - Diet Sayler: La Pittura non mente. Fortuna Arte, Messina.
  - Reflections upon Drawing. BWA Lublin.
  - Spazio Libro d’Artista. Palazzo Manganelli, Catania.
  - Sehen ganz nah und sehr fern. Städtische Galerie Erlangen.
- 2008
  - Diet Sayler. Galerie Ursula Huber, Basel.
  - Diet Sayler. Galerie der Moderne, Munich.
  - Diet Sayler. Retrospektive Städtische Galerie Erlangen.
  - Arhiva Demarco. Brukenthal National Museum Sibiu.
  - Dialog der Generationen. Forum konkrete Kunst, Erfurt.
  - Intelligible Non-Violent. Art Atlas Sztuki, Łódź.
- 2007
  - Still & Konsequent. Die Sammlung Uwe Obier, Kunstverein Siegen.
- 2006
  - Bewegung im Quadrat. Museum Ritter, Waldenbuch.
  - Kolekcja W centrum wydarzen. Zacheta, Lublin.
  - Diet Sayler. University Gallery Plzeň.
  - Diet Sayler und Tatsushi Kawanabe. kunst galerie fürth, Fürth.
  - Diet Sayler. BWA Lublin.
  - Motiva. Austria Center Vienna, Vienna.
  - Square. Eröffnungsausstellung Museum Ritter, Waldenbuch.
  - Identidades. Galeria Edurne, Madrid.
- 2005
  - Stets Konkret. Die Hubertus Schoeller Stiftung. Leopold Hoesch Museum, Düren.
  - Diet Sayler. Galerie Uwe Sacksofsky, Heidelberg.
  - La boite en valise oder Die Neue Welt liegt mitten in Europa. Academy of Fine Arts, Prague.
  - Gelb und Gold. Galerie Linde Hollinger, Ladenburg.
  - experiment konkret. Museum für Konkrete Kunst, Ingolstadt.
- 2004
  - Europa konkret. Altana Galerie, Dresden.
- 2003
  - Kunst zeigt, was man nicht sieht. Städtische Galerie Erlangen.
  - Diet Sayler. Galerie Linde Hollinger, Ladenburg.
  - Diet Sayler. Galerie Kunst im Gang, Bamberg.
  - Konkrete Kunst – Einheit und Vielfalt. Kunsthalle Villa Kobe, Halle.
- 2002
  - Segni e contesti. Studio B2, Genoa.
  - Diet Sayler., Nottingham Trent University.
- 2001
  - Diet Sayler: Geometria e tempo. Palazzo Ducale, Genoa.
  - Kunst für Kaliningrad-Königsberg. Kaliningrad State Art Gallery.
- 2000
  - Diet Sayler. Czech Museum of Fine Arts, Prague.
  - Diet Sayler. Retrospective Kettle's Yard, Cambridge.

== Selected literature – monographs, catalogs ==
- Anca Arghir, Eugen Gomringer: Diet Sayler. Veränderung. Galerie Herrmanns, Munich 1979.
- Lucio Barbera, Saro Gulletta: Diet Sayler. 18 Aprile – 31 Maggio 2009, galeria fortuna arte: Messina 2009.
- Max Bense, Diet Sayler: Diet Sayler. Ausstellungskatalog [Zeichnungen, Bilder, Fotos; Ausstellung vom 16. Mai – 9 Juni 1978, Studiengalerie, Studium Generale, Univ. Stuttgart]. Stuttgart 1978.
- Viana Conti, Pier Giulio Bonifacio, Hanswalter Graf, Diet Sayler: Geometrie di confine. Tre casi. Bonifacio Graf Sayler; dal 19 gennaio al 18 febbraio 1995. Galleria Orti Sauli. Genova 1995.
- Richard W. Gassen, Roxana Theodorescu, Jan Sekera, Michael Harriso, Vera Molnar, Lida von Mengden, Dora Maurer, Jan Andrew Nilsen, Waldo Balart, Nathan Cohen, Paul Brand, Ward Jackson, Mel Gooding, Joachim Heusinger von Waldegg, Paul Gherasim: Diet Sayler. Monographie, Verlag für moderne Kunst Nürnberg 1999.
- Eugen Gomringer; Diet Sayler: fünf linien. fünf worte. Mappenwerk. Ingolstadt 1976.
- Eugen Gomringer, Hans Jörg Glattfelder, Lida von Mengden, Herwig Graef, Vera Molnar, Ruth Ziegler, Ewald Jeutter, Michael Eissenhauer, Michael Harrison, Vincenzo Accame: Sich ein Bild machen von Diet Sayler. Monographie. Graef Verlag, Nuremberg 2007.
- Saro Gulletta, Lucio Barbera, Ruth Ziegler, Vincenzo Accama, Michael Eissenhauer, Marcello Faletra, Michael Harrison, Herwig Graef, Diet Sayler, Diet: La pittura non mente. Painting does not lie. Monografia. Magika Edizioni. Messina 2009.
- Bernhard Kerber, Diet Sayler: Diet Sayler. Mai 1984, Ausstellungskatalog, Galerie Brigitte Hilger, Aachen. Aachen 1984.
- Lida von Mengden: Diet Sayler. Monographie. Verlag für moderne Kunst, Nuremberg 1994.
- Jürgen Morschel, Diet Sayler: Diet Sayler. Linien. 6.6.-14. August 1982 Artforum Frankfurt. Frankfurt 1982.
- Uwe Obier: Vera Röhm, Diet Sayler. 5.7 – 11. August 1991. Städtische Galerie Lüdenscheid 1991.
- Diet Sayler: Fünf Linien. Text von Elisabeth Axmann. Mappenwerk. Friedberg 1983.
- Diet Sayler: Sieben Linien. Text von Heiner Stachelhaus. Mappenwerk. Friedberg 1983.
- Diet Sayler: Vier Linien. Text von Dietmar Guderian. Mappenwerk. Friedberg 1983.
- Diet Sayler (Hg.): 10 Jahre Klasse Sayler. Akademie der Bildenden Künste in Nürnberg, 1993 – 2003; [anlässlich der Ausstellungen Klasse Sayler: Kunstverein Hochfranken Selb 1.6. – 12. Juli 2003, Akademie der Bildenden Künste Nürnberg 12.11. – 14. Dezember 2003]. Nuremberg 2003.
- Lucie Schauer: Vera Röhm, Diet Sayler. Körper Zeit Bewegung; Neuer Berliner Kunstverein 10.4. – 12. Mai 1990; Wilhelm-Hack-Museum Ludwigshafen 11.8. – 23. September 1990. Neuer Berliner Kunstverein. Berlin 1990.
- Helmut Schneider, Diet Sayler: Diet Sayler. Ausstellung 3. März – 30. April 1983 Galerie Hermanns. Galerie Hermanns. Munich 1983.
- Peter Volkwein: Diet Sayler, Basis-Konzepte. Museum für Konkrete Kunst Ingolstadt, 19.03.93 – 18.04.94; Muzeul Banatului, Timișoara, 15.10.93 – 30.11.93; BWA Museum, Lublin, 10.12.93 – 26.01.94. Ingolstadt 1994.
