= Enlightenment Guaranteed =

2000 German film about two brothers seeking enlightenment through Zen Buddhism

Erleuchtung garantiert
- Directed by: Doris Dörrie
- Starring: Uwe Ochsenknecht; Gustav Peter Wöhler; Petra Zieser; Ulrike Kriener; Anica Dobra; Heiner Lauterbach; Pierre Sanoussi-Bliss
- Distributed by: Constantin Film
- Release date: 30 October 1999 (Hof Film Festival)
- Country: Germany
- Language: German
- Box office: $0.8 million

Erleuchtung garantiert (Enlightenment Guaranteed) is a 1999 German film directed by Doris Dörrie about two brothers, Uwe (Uwe Ochsenknecht) and Gustav (Gustav-Peter Wöhler), who travel to Japan in order to find themselves. The two plan to retreat for a while at the Sōji-ji Monastery in Monzen, Ishikawa in the Noto Peninsula, well away from Tokyo. On their way there, in a rather literal Buddhist moment, the brothers lose all of their belongings. When they finally make it to the monastery, they find that even there, enlightenment can be elusive.

== Plot ==
The film begins by detailing the troubled lives of the two brothers; each is experiencing a mid life crisis. With four young children, Uwe and his wife Petra find their obligations overburdening, having little compassion for the other's problems and constantly bickering. Uwe leaves for work after a particularly stressful morning, during which he once again argues with his wife; while at work as a real estate agent, his wife packs up most of their belongings and moves out. Uwe finds a note when he comes home and is immediately distressed to tears.

Meanwhile, his brother Gustav faces his own problems; though an enthusiast for Zen Buddhism, and outwardly more composed than his brother, Gustav's burdens are internal; he is afraid of making mistakes and also afraid of fear itself. Gustav plans a trip to a monastery in Monzen (far away from Tokyo) in order to find himself. Uwe, both greatly distressed and drunk, asks his brother to take him along. After much hesitation, Gustav agrees to buy his brother a ticket.

== Production ==
Enlightment Guaranteed, though not a direct sequel to Dörrie's previous landmark 1985 film Men..., starred both the same actors (albeit as different characters) and a similarly existential storyline, and was occasionally billed as a sequel to the film.

== Reception ==
After three weeks of release in Germany, the film had grossed $827,000.
