= Nobody Loves Me =

Nobody Loves Me may refer to:

- Nobody Loves Me (film), 1994 German film
- 1949 song by Memphis Slim based on Every Day I Have the Blues
- "Nobody Loves Me", a song by Limp Bizkit, from the album Three Dollar Bill, Y'all
