= Freche Mädchen =

- Directed by: Ute Wieland
- Written by: Maggie Peren
- Produced by: Ulrich Limmer
- Starring: Emilia Schüle; Selina Shirin Müller; Henriette Nagel; Jonathan Beck; Wilson Gonzalez Ochsenknecht; Piet Klocke; Michael Kessler; Armin Rohde; Anke Engelke; Christian Tramitz
- Cinematography: Peter Przybylski
- Edited by: Dunja Campregher
- Music by: Tilo M. Heinrich
- Distributed by: Constantin Film
- Release date: July 6, 2008
- Running time: 97 minutes
- Country: Germany
- Language: German

Freche Mädchen (transl. Cheeky Girls) is a 2008 German teen film directed by Ute Wieland. Its script was written by Bianka Minte-König and it is based on the book series Freche Mädchen – freche Bücher.

== Plot ==
Mila, Hanna and Kati - all 14 years old - are best friends and would do everything for each other. Together, they set up their music teacher with their German teacher in order to improve Mila's grades. Regarding their own lives, the girl are confused about love: At first, Kati adores “Sandwich”-Tobi (a nickname the girls got him because you always find him eating a sandwich), but since he does not seem to notice her like she would want him to, Kati falls in love with her cousin Florian. Hanna has a crush as well and starts dating Branko, who is a few years older than the girls. Only Mila's love life doesn't seem to exist, until she meets trainee teacher Pit Winter, the stand-in for her pregnant German teacher.

Mila even anonymously writes a love poem for him but when she finds out that her mother suddenly has a dinner date with Pit, Mila's love-life takes a turn to the worse. Pit Winter reads the poem and somehow knows that Mila was the one who wrote it. The only aspect he focuses on are the errors Mila made due to her dyslexia. For Kati and Hanna, things do not go well anymore either. Florian fell in love with his piano teacher and therefore breaks up with Kati shortly before her birthday party. Branko and Hanna are squabbling with each other because Mila and Hanna have applied for a casting show Hanna keeps participating at although Branko feels ashamed about her being part of it. But there is someone else Hanna has met at the casting...

The three girls are alone again and are busy with problems like Vanessa, the ‘Drama Queen’, ‘Porn-Kiwi’(a nickname he was given by the girls, because he constantly watches porn) or the annoying Maths teacher. Marcus, whom Mila sees as a macho slowly sneaks into her life.

Brian, a new student from Hamburg causes trouble between the girls: Kati immediately falls in love with him and demands that no one else should get too close to him. When Mila rewrites a poem for Brian who turns it into a song, an icy mood comes up between Kati and Mila. During a school trip to a planetarium, somebody kissed Mila in the dark which lead her to the conclusion that Brian could possibly like her instead of Kati. In addition, someone called Pegasus sends Mila romantic messages and translates a song text for her - all signs point to Brian being her admirer, don't they?

When Mila's mother announces her pregnancy and that Pit Winter is the father of the baby, Mila's drama is complete. She runs away in anger and sleeps at a suspension railway station. The next morning, Markus shows up at the station and takes her to his father's riding school. When Mila sees a picture of a class-trip, where everybody gathered around a statue of Pegasus and next to it a picture of herself with Markus, she realizes that Markus must be Pegasus. Overwhelmed by this discovery, she walks back home. At home, her mother is very happy and relieved to see Mila, and she tells her that the pregnancy test showed a wrong result – She is not pregnant. She adds that Pit Winter would not have wanted a child with her anyway and wishes for Mila to find a nice boy, who appreciates her, for who she is. This moment is an eye-opener for Mila. Together with her mother, she drives back to the riding school. She finds Markus on top of a hill he had shown her before, as it has a special meaning to him, and kisses him.

Not just Mila but everybody gets their happy end: Sure, Kati had a crush on Brian but after seeing that he is madly in love with mean girl Vanessa, she leaves his concert in a sad mood. On her way home, Kati gets attacked by a drunk guy in a tunnel. Luckily, Tobi is nearby to defend her and “knocks” him to the ground. Kati being Kati, without a second thought, instantly falls madly in love with Tobi all over again. In the meantime, Hanna is in Munich for the casting show and made it to the quarterfinals. Shortly before her next performance, her talisman – a heart – starts to glow. The talisman was a gift from Branko. He himself has a second heart and they both start to glow if the other heart is nearby. Finally, Hanna and Branko find each other and they get together again after Hanna was eliminated from the show during the quarterfinals.
