= Natascha Ochsenknecht =

German actress (born 1964)

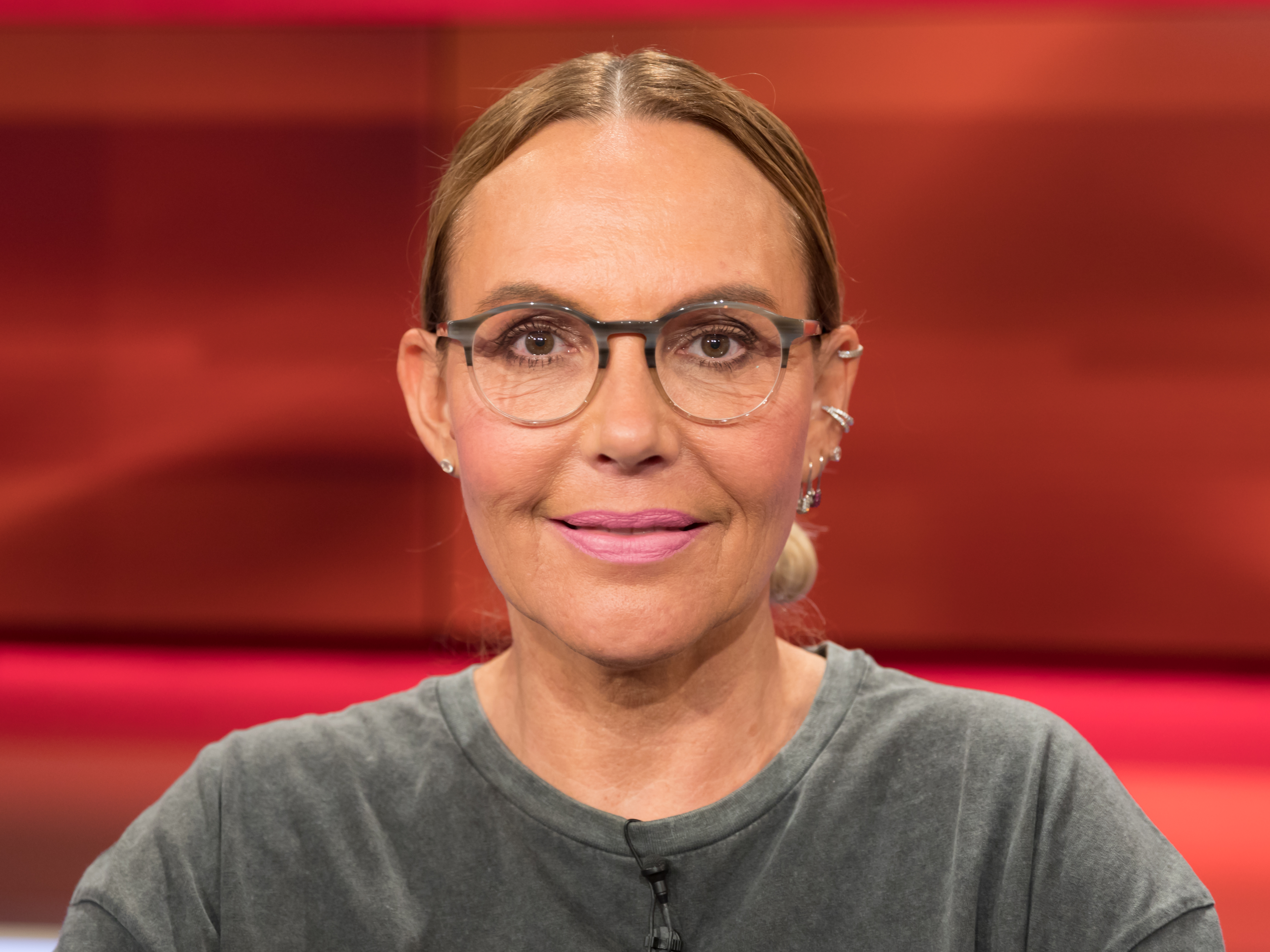
Ochsenknecht in 2019

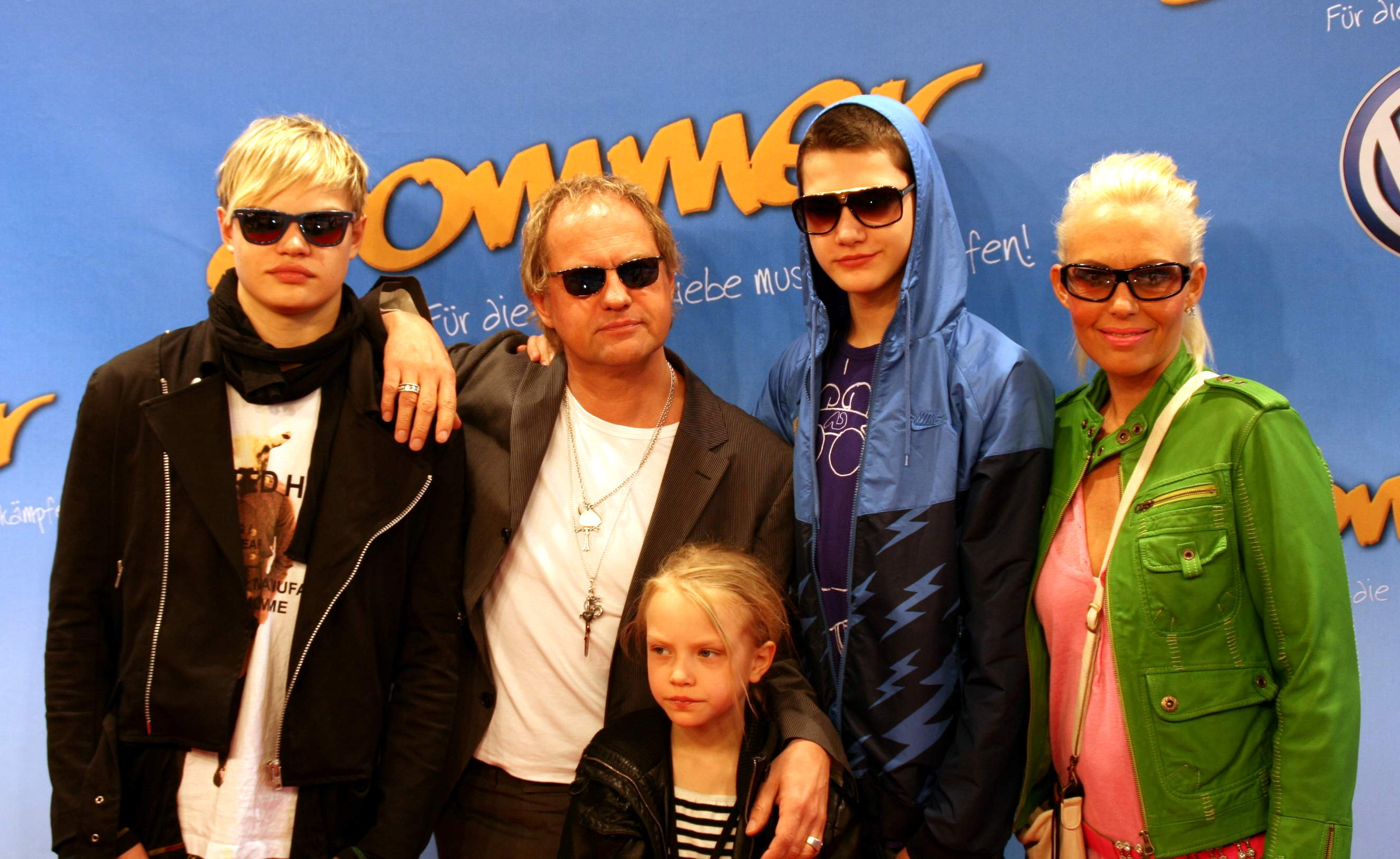
Wilson Gonzalez, Uwe, Cheyenne, Jimi Blue and Natascha Ochsenknecht (2008)

Natascha Ochsenknecht (née Wierichs; born 17 August 1964) is a German TV personality, author, entrepreneur, actress, and former model.

She has three children with actor Uwe Ochsenknecht: Wilson Gonzalez, Jimi Blue and Cheyenne. From 2010 to 2019, she was in a relationship with former German-Turkish footballer Umut Kekıllı.
