= Me and Him =

- Directed by: Doris Dörrie
- Screenplay by: Alberto Moravia (novel); Warren Leight
- Based on: Doris Dörrie; Michael Juncker
- Produced by: Bernd Eichinger
- Starring: Griffin Dunne; Ellen Greene; Kelly Bishop; Craig T. Nelson
- Cinematography: Helge Weindler
- Edited by: Raimund Barthelmes
- Music by: Klaus Doldinger
- Production company: Neue Constantin Film
- Distributed by: Neue Constantin Film (West Germany); Columbia Pictures (USA)
- Release dates: September 15, 1988 (West Germany); August 4, 1989 (USA)
- Running time: 93 minutes
- Countries: United States; West Germany
- Language: English
- Box office: 3.4 million admissions (West Germany)

Me and Him (German: Ich und Er) is a 1988 comedy film. It depicts a man whose penis develops a mind of its own and starts telling him what to do, often to the point where people think that he's crazy.

It is a remake of the Italian film Io e lui (1973).

== Cast ==
- Griffin Dunne as Bert Uttanzi
- Ellen Greene as Annette Uttanzi
- Kelly Bishop as Eleanor Aramis
- Carey Lowell as Janet Anderson
- David Alan Grier as Peter Conklin
- Craig T. Nelson as Peter Aramis
- Mark Linn-Baker as "Him"
- Kim Flowers as Corazon
- Bill Raymond as Humphrey
- Rocco Sisto as Art Strong
- Robert LaSardo as Tony
- Jodie Markell as Eileen
- Reg E. Cathey as Waiter
- Samuel E. Wright as Paramedic
- Alison Fraser as Dancing Secretary
- Charlayne Woodard as Dancing Secretary
- Lillias White as Dancing Secretary

== Reception ==
The film grossed $1.3 million (2.6 million Deutsche mark) in its first four days of release in West Germany from 170 screens. The film was number one in West Germany for seven consecutive weeks and was the most popular German film for the year with admissions of 3,434,840, ranking sixth overall.

The film grossed only $78,814 in the United States.
