= 1956 in German television =

This is a list of German television-related events in 1956.

== Events ==
- 24 May - Germany enters the Eurovision Song Contest for the first time with "Im Wartesaal zum großen Glück", performed by Walter Andreas Schwarz and "So geht das jede Nacht", performed by Freddy Quinn.

== Television shows ==
=== 1950s ===
- Tagesschau (1952–present)

== Births ==
- 23 February
  - Sabine Sauer, TV host & journalist
  - Reinhold Beckmann, TV host, football commentator & singer
- 24 July - Carmen Nebel, TV host
