= Am I Beautiful? =

1998 film by Doris Dörrie

- Directed by: Doris Dörrie
- Starring: Franka Potente; Heike Makatsch; Senta Berger; Iris Berben
- Distributed by: Constantin Film
- Release date: 17 September 1998
- Running time: 117 minutes
- Country: Germany
- Language: German

Am I Beautiful? (German: Bin ich schön?) is a 1998 German comedy film directed by Doris Dörrie.

== Premise ==
The film is about people in German having trouble with love and identity.

== Cast ==
- Marie Zielcke as Angelina
- Carla Weindler as Carla
- Julian Messner as Philip
- Suzanne von Borsody as Lucy
- Franka Potente as Linda
- Gustav-Peter Wöhler as Werner
- Steffen Wink as Klaus
- Anica Dobra as Franziska
- Iris Berben as Rita
- Oliver Nägele as Fred
- Maria Schrader as Elke
- Dietmar Schönherr as Juan
- Beatriz Castillón Mateo as Marie (young)
- Uwe Ochsenknecht as Bodo
- Lorenza Sophia Zorer as Engel
- Heike Makatsch as Vera
- Juan Diego Botto as Felipe
- Gisela Schneeberger as Tamara
- Nina Petri as Charlotte
- Joachim Król as Robert
- Lina Lambsdorff as Lili
- Gottfried John as Herbert
- Elisabeth Romano as Jessica
- Senta Berger as Unna
- Andoni Gracia as Spanish boy
- Michael Klemm as Holger
- Enrico Boetcher as Man at airport
- Christine Osterlein as Old lady
- Ludwig Haller as Man with sunglasses
- Otto Sander as David
- Pierre Sanoussi-Bliss as Paco
- Maria Piniella as Pinkola
- Fernanda de Utrera as Singer

Sound track composed by Roman Bunka.
