= Pierre Sanoussi-Bliss =

German actor and director (born 1962)

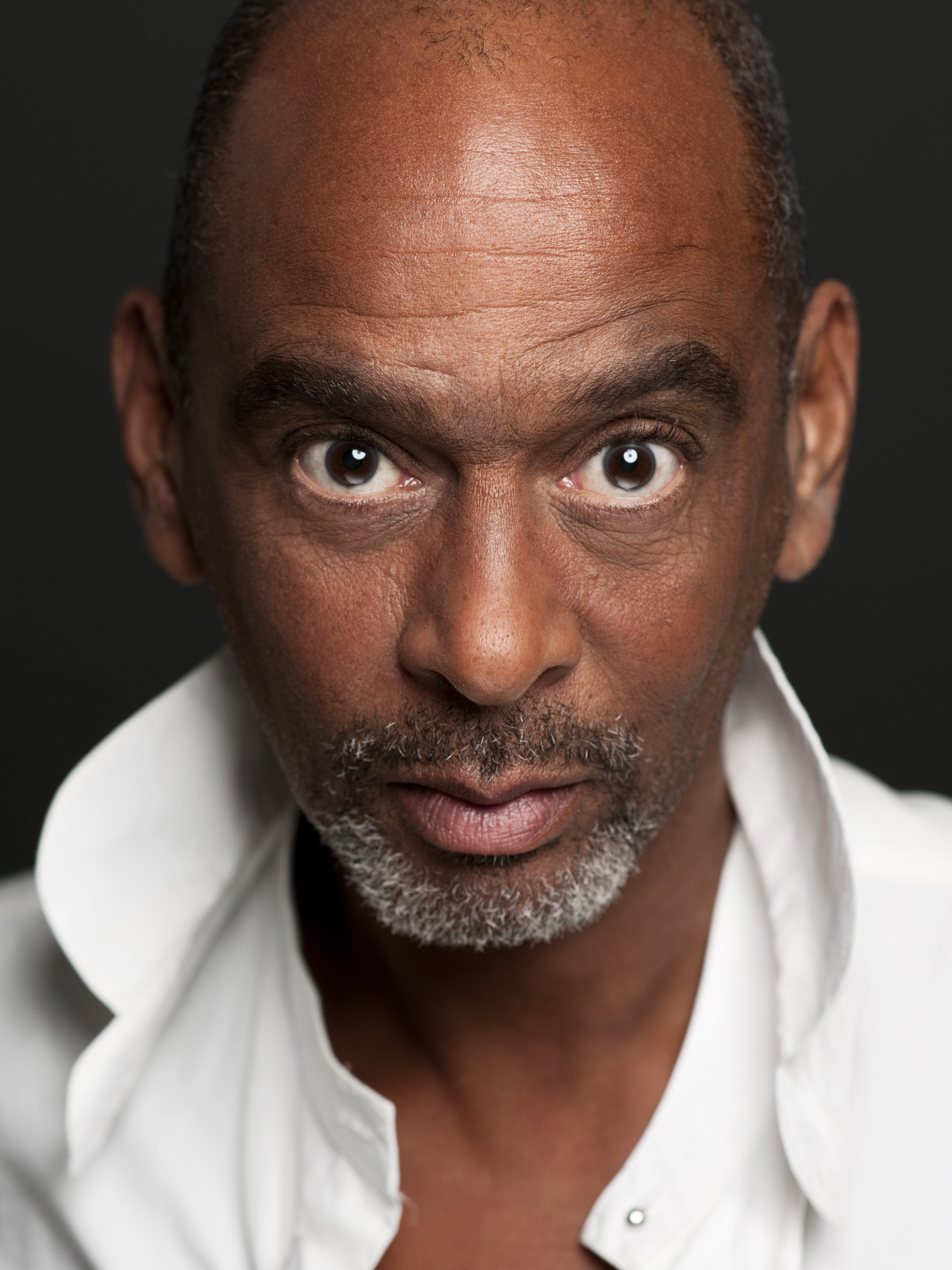
Pierre Sanoussi-Bliss.

Pierre Sanoussi-Bliss (born 17 August 1962, Berlin-Mitte, East Berlin) is a German actor and director. He has appeared in television and films for over 20 years. He played a leading role in Doris Dörrie's 1994 film, Nobody Loves Me. He also plays a leading role in the comedy series Alles wird gut.

His most famous role is likely that of Axel Richter in the detective series The Old Fox from 1997. He has also directed Return to Go! (2000), for which he was nominated for an award in the International Filmfest Emden. The film premiered at the 2000 Berlin International Film Festival, was shown at over 60 international film festivals and is available on DVD. Sanoussi-Bliss made a famous speech as the only representative of the media at the 2006 international summit at the German Chancellery.

Sanoussi-Bliss has done voice work in audiobooks, such as Salve Roma! by Akif Pirinçci and Was machen wir jetzt? by Doris Dörrie. He works as an honorary ambassador at the Children's Hospice in Mitteldeutschland Nordhausen in Tambach-Dietharz.

== Personal life ==
Sanoussi-Bliss was educated in the Ernst Busch Academy of Dramatic Arts (Hochschule für Schauspielkunst "Ernst Busch"). His life partner since 2002, Till Kaposty-Bliss, is a graphic designer. The couple lives in Berlin. He is 182 centimetres (5.97 ft) tall. He is of Guinean descent.

== Nominations ==
Emden Film Award (2000)

== Selected filmography ==
- 1989: Verflixtes Mißgeschick!
- 1989: Coming Out
- 1993: Zirri - Das Wolkenschaf
- 1994: Nobody Loves Me
- 1996: The Superwife
- 1998: Am I Beautiful?
- 2000: Return to Go!- Sam
- 2002: Angst isst Seele auf
- 2010: The Hairdresser

== Bibliography ==
- Sanoussi-Bliss, Pierre and Paul Gilling: Der Nix. Kato Kunst und Verlag (2006); ISBN 3-938572-06-X
