= Doris Dörrie =

German film director, producer and author (born 1955)

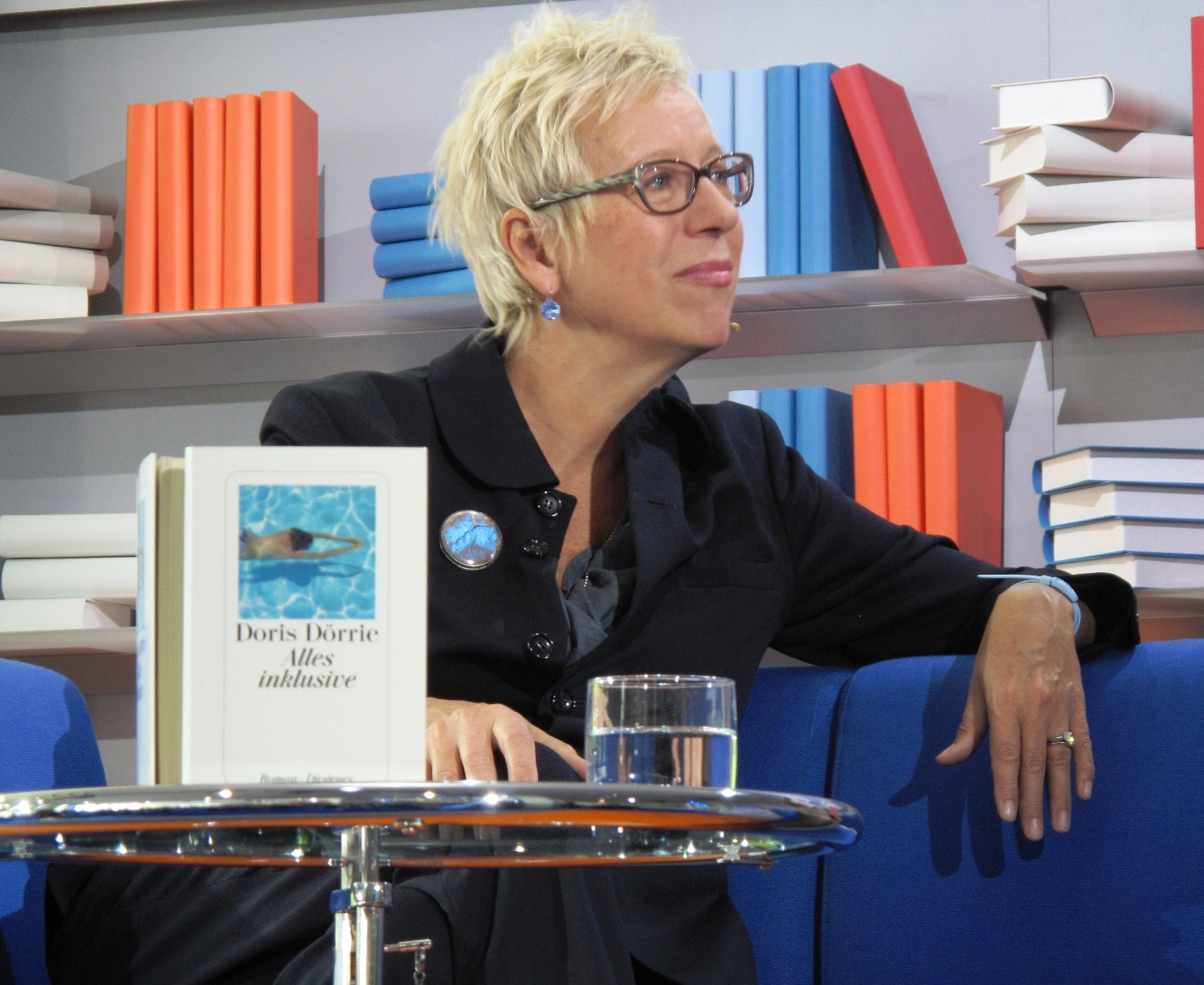
- Doris Dörrie at the Frankfurt Book Fair, 2011
- Born: 26 May 1955 (age 71); Hanover, West Germany
- Occupations: Film director, Film producer, Author
- Years active: 1976–present
- Notable work: Men... Me and Him

Doris Dörrie (German: [ˈdoː.ʁɪs ˈdœ.ri̯ə]; born 26 May 1955) is a German film director, producer, and author. She is known for her comedic and socially critical films, particularly Men… (1985), which achieved both national and international acclaim. Dörrie has received critical recognition for both her cinematic and literary work, earning several awards, including the 2012 Bavarian Film Award and the 2003 German Book Award.

== Early life and education ==
Born in Hanover, West Germany, Dörrie completed her secondary education there in 1973. That same year, she began a two-year attendance in film studies in the drama department of the University of the Pacific in Stockton, California. She then studied semantics, psychology, and philosophy at the New School for Social Research in New York City.

In 1975, back in West Germany, Dörrie began to study at the University of Television and Film Munich. In 1978, she completed her studies along with her final project film, The First Waltz, earning her diploma in directing.

== Career ==
Between 1976 and 1986, Dörrie wrote film reviews for the Süddeutsche Zeitung. From 1979 to 1986, she directed shorts and documentaries for German television and also directed children's films, including Paula from Portugal. In 1983, she made her feature film debut with Straight Through the Heart, which examines the relationship between a 20-year-old woman and the middle-aged male dentist with whom she moves in. This film was noted for both following and deviating from screwball comedy conventions, its exploration of gender role resistance, and the tension between male and female perspectives.

In 1985, Dörrie's third feature film Men… earned her both national and international success. This film is a feminist satire that follows a man who, upon discovering his wife's infidelity, attempts to make her lover in his own image so she gets tired of him. Within the first six months of this low-budget comedy's release, it accumulated six million viewers and brought Dörrie commercial success. This film earned Dörrie recognition and led Der Spiegel to write a story on her, praising her as "Germany’s most successful [woman] director.”

Following Men… (1985), Dörrie directed Me and Him (1987), a film inspired by Alberto Moravia’s novel about an architect whose penis speaks to him. However, this film did not receive the same level of success, with film historian Rob Edelman noting this film as unamusing and disappointing compared to Men… (1985).

In 1987, Dörrie began her writing career, and her short story collections soon garnered critical praise. Many of her films are loosely based on her short stories, including Forever and Always: A Kind of Round Dance (1991), which influenced the screenplay for both Nobody Loves Me (1994) and Am I Beautiful? (1998). The short stories center on the female character Fanny Finck, chronicling fifteen years of her life alongside her classmate Antonia. Critic Mathis Heybrock compared Forever and Always: A Kind of Round Dance (1991) to a kaleidoscope, due to its shifting perspective and non-linear structure.

In 1989, Dörrie co-founded Cobra Filmproduktions GmbH with her friends to produce her later films. In 1995, Dörrie directed another of her notable films, the comedy Nobody Loves Me. In an interview, Dörrie explained that her goal was to depict the female protagonist as having everything yet being discontent, ultimately isolating herself, to reflect young adults in Germany at the time, as well as Germany more broadly. Scholars Kathryn Barnwell and Marni Stanley praised the film for its treatment of gender and class, but note that it inadequately examines the challenges associated with Germany's embrace of multiculturalism.

In later years, Dörrie became a film professor in Munich and also taught creative writing in the United States. In 1998, Dörrie published her first children’s book, Lotte will Prinzessin sein, illustrated by Julia Kaergel. In 2001, Dörrie led the production of Mozart’s Così fan tutte at the state opera house in Berlin. By 2003, she had produced a variety of works, including several documentaries, ten feature films, seven collections of short stories, a novel, a play, and three children’s books.

== Style and themes ==
Dörrie's work is noted for its social commentary, humour and satirical tone, with her films often exploring the differing perspectives of men and women. Her 1980 and 1990 comedy films established her as a contributor to the new wave of German comedies, with her films' lighthearted tone contrasting the more pensive tone of New German Cinema films. Her films have attracted both praise and criticism: film historian Eric Rentschler criticized her films for prioritizing entertainment over critical insight, while German studies academic Heather Merle Benbow described her films as socially insightful.

Dörrie has stated that her experience as a director aids her writing, with many of her unpublished short stories serving as inspiration for her screenplays. She has stated that she holds different goals for her literary and cinematic work, noting that her films aim to leave viewers happier than before watching them.

== Personal life ==
Dörrie is a member of the PEN Centre Germany and the German Film Academy. She was a member of the jury for the 2019 Prize of the National Gallery. Since 2019, she has been a member of the Academy of Motion Picture Arts and Sciences.

In 2019, Dörrie served on the jury that chose Pauline Curnier Jardin as the winner of the Preis der Nationalgalerie.

== Filmography ==
- 1976: Come Rain or Shine (Ob’s stürmt oder schneit)
- 1977: Ene, mine, mink
- 1978: The First Waltz (Der Erste Walzer)
- 1978: Hättest was Gescheites gelernt
- 1978: Alt werden in der Fremde
- 1979: Paula from Portugal (Paula aus Portugal)
- 1980: No Trace of Romanticism (Von Romantik keine spur)
- 1980: Katharina Eiselt
- 1981: In Between (Dazwischen), co-created film for TV
- 1981: Among Noisy Sheep (Unter Schafen)
- 1983: Straight Through the Heart (Mitten ins Herz)
- 1985: In the Belly of the Whale (Im Innern des Wals)
- 1985: Men... (Männer...)
- 1986: Paradise (Paradies)
- 1988: Me and Him (Ich und Er), starring Griffin Dunne, Ellen Greene, Kelly Bishop, Carey Lowell
- 1989: Money (Geld)
- 1992: Happy Birthday, Turk! (Happy Birthday, Türke!), starring Hansa Czypionka
- 1994: Nobody Loves Me (Keiner liebt mich)
- 1998: Denk ich an Deutschland … – Augenblick (TV documentary series episode)
- 1998: Am I Beautiful? (Bin ich schön?), starring Franka Potente, Senta Berger, Heike Makatsch, Iris Berben
- 2000: Enlightenment Guaranteed (Erleuchtung garantiert)
- 2002: Naked (Nackt)
- 2005: The Fisherman and His Wife (Der Fischer und seine Frau)
- 2007: How to Cook Your Life, a documentary about Zen chef Edward Espe Brown
- 2008: Cherry Blossoms (Kirschblüten – Hanami)
- 2010: The Hairdresser (Die Friseuse)
- 2012: Bliss (Glück)
- 2014: The Whole Shebang (Alles inklusive)
- 2016: Greetings from Fukushima
- 2019: Cherry Blossoms and Demons (Kirschblüten & Dämonen)
- 2022: The Pool

== Fiction ==
- Liebe Schmerz und das ganze verdammte Zeug: Vier Geschichten (1987); Eng. tr. Love, Pain and the Whole Damn Thing: Four Stories (1989)
- "Was wollen Sie von Mir?" und 15 andere Geschichten (1989); Eng. tr. What Do You Want From Me? (1993)
- Der Mann meiner Träume (1991); Eng. tr. The Man of my Dreams
- Für immer und ewig: eine Art Reigen (1991); Eng. tr. Forever and Always: A Kind of Round Dance
- Bin ich schön? Erzählungen (1994); Eng. tr. Am I Beautiful? Stories
- Lotte will Prinzessin sein (1998); Eng. tr. Lotte Wants to be a Princess
- Happy (2001)
- Das blaue Kleid (2004); Eng. tr. The Blue Dress

== Awards ==
- 1999 Bavarian Film Awards, Best Screenplay
- 1999 German Film Award in Gold for Am I Beautiful?
- 2003 Cultural Honorary Award of the City of Munich for film Naked
- 2003 German Book Award for Das blaue Kleid
- 2012 Bavarian Film Award, Best Director
- 2021 Bavarian Maximilian Order for Science and Art
- 2022 Brothers Grimm Poetics Professorship
- 2023 Honorary citizen of the state capital Munich

== Bibliography ==
- Breitenstein, Andreas. "Alptraum vom Traummann: Doris Dörries Erzählung Der Mann meiner Träume." Neue Zürcher Zeitung (22 July 1991).
- Elss, Karin. "Doris Dörrie als Erzählerin." Saarbrücker Zeitung (24 August 1989).
- Görtz, Franz Josef. "Beiläufige Tragödien: Geschichten von der Filmemacherin Doris Dörrie." Frankfurter Allgemeine Zeitung (14 March 1989).
- Joglekar, Yogini. "Ethnic Noir in Post-Wall Germany: Happy Birthday, Türke! (Dörrie 1991)." Clues: A Journal of Detection 24.2 (Winter 2006): 17–29.
- Jurczyk, Günther. "Brav Geschmollt: Doris Dörrie erzählt." Stuttgarter Zeitung (11 October 1989).
- Phillips, Klaus. "A Conversation with Doris Dörrie." In: Straight Through the Heart: Doris Dörrie, German Filmmaker and Author, ed. Franz Birgel, Klaus Phillips and Christian-Albrecht Gollub. Lanham: Scarecrow Press, 2004. pp. 1–16.
- Steuhl, Wolfgang. "Antonia und der Dreckspatz: Wenn ein Mannequin den Mann ihrer Träume findet." Frankfurter Allgemeine Zeitung (13 April 1991).
- Utz, Richard. "Reflecting Love at Quite Its Natural Size: Doris Dörrie as a Writer." In: Straight Through the Heart: Doris Dörrie, German Filmmaker and Author, ed. Franz Birgel, Klaus Phillips and Christian-Albrecht Gollub. Lanham: Scarecrow Press, 2004. pp. 177–87.
