= Hubertus Meyer-Burckhardt =

German author and talk show host (born 1956)

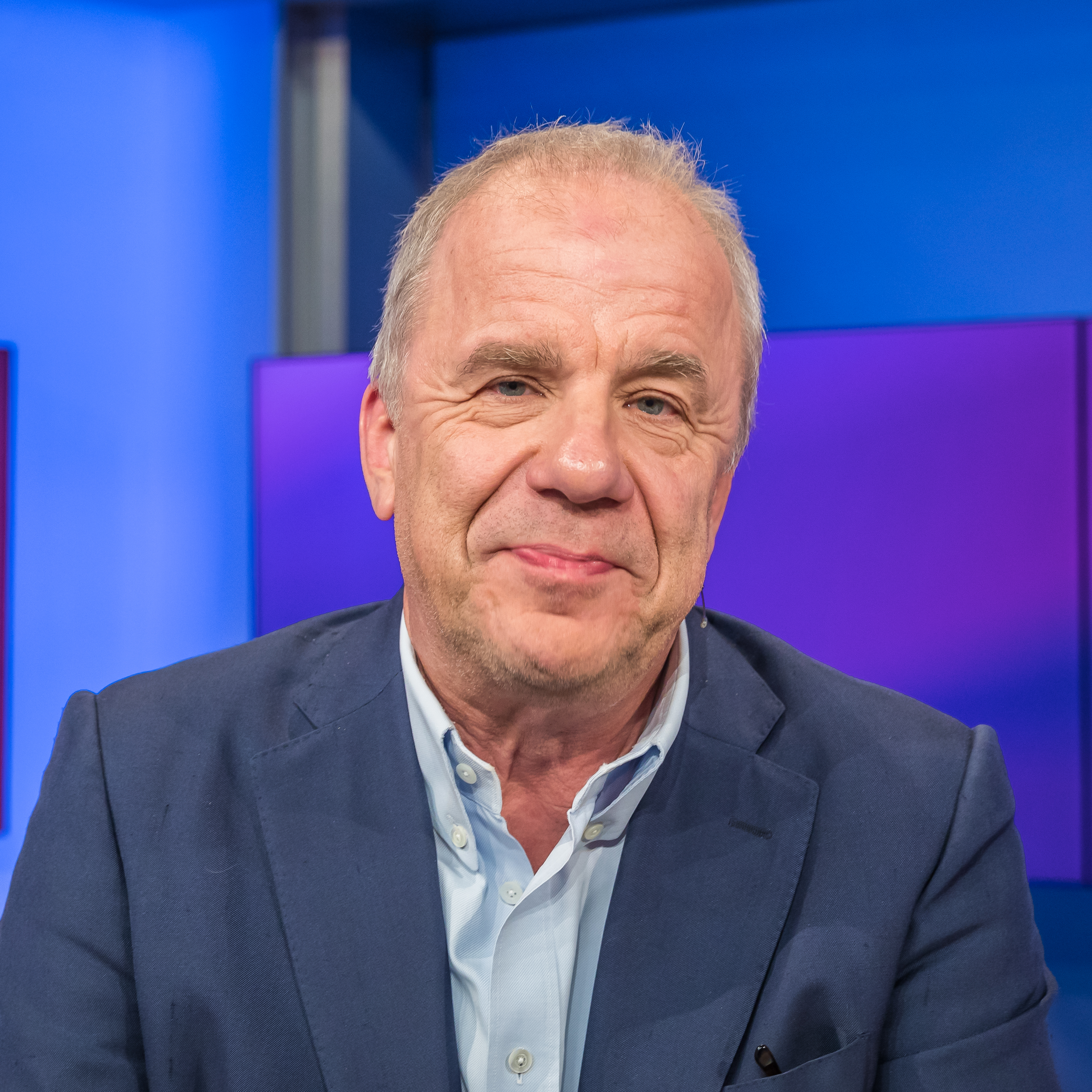
- Hubertus Meyer-Burckhardt, 2022
- Born: Huberts Meyer-Burckhardt; 24 July 1956 (age 68); Kassel, West Germany
- Occupation: television journalist
- Years active: 1990–present

Hubertus Meyer-Burckhardt (born 24 July 1956 in Kassel) is a German author, television presenter and talkshow host.

== Life ==
He studied history and philosophy in Munich, Berlin and Hamburg. Meyer-Burckhardt works as television journalist on German broadcaster Norddeutscher Rundfunk. He is talk show host of German NDR Talk Show. As author he wrote several books. In several film and TV productions he worked as an actor.

== Awards (selection) ==
- 2002: award of city Kassel
- five Goldene Löwen
- Bavarian TV Awards
- Nominination for Emmy Award
- three Adolf-Grimme-Awards 1998 for Das Urteil
- Adolf-Grimme-Award 1994 Sowieso – Die Sonntagsshow
- Nomination for Adolf-Grimme-Award 1992 as author, producer and moderator of ARD-production How much?

== Books ==
- Die Kündigung. Ullstein, Berlin 2011, ISBN 978-3-550-08849-0 (Hörbuch: procella books/Hypertension, Hamburg 2011, ISBN 978-3-9814740-0-8).
- Die kleine Geschichte einer großen Liebe. Bastei Lübbe, Cologne 2014, ISBN 978-3-431-03901-6.
- Meine Tage mit Fabienne. Bastei Lübbe, Köln 2016, ISBN 978-3-431-03953-5 (Lübbe Audio, Cologne 2016 ISBN 978-3-7857-5218-0)

== Filmography (selection) ==
- 1996: Trickser (TV-film, film director: Oliver Hirschbiegel)
- 1996: Rendezvous des Todes (TV-film, film director: Richard Huber)
- 1997: Das Urteil (TV-film, film director: Oliver Hirschbiegel)
- 2002: My Last Film (cinema film, film director: Oliver Hirschbiegel)
- 2005: Just an Ordinary Jew (cinema film, film director: Oliver Hirschbiegel)
- 2011: Blaubeerblau (TV-Film, film director: Rainer Kaufmann)
- 2012: Der Klügere zieht aus (TV-film, film director: Christoph Schnee)
- 2013: Mein Mann, ein Mörder (TV-film, film director: Lancelot von Naso)
- 2014: Blindgänger (TV-film, film director: Peter Kahane)
