= Men... =

1985 film

- Film poster
- Directed by: Doris Dörrie
- Written by: Doris Dörrie
- Produced by: Elvira Senft; Helmut Rasp; Denyse Noever
- Starring: Heiner Lauterbach
- Cinematography: Helge Weindler
- Edited by: Raimund Barthelmes
- Music by: Claus Bantzer
- Production companies: ZDF; Olga-Film
- Distributed by: Filmverlag der Autoren
- Release date: 19 December 1985
- Running time: 99 minutes
- Country: West Germany
- Language: German
- Box office: $20 million

Men… (German: Männer…) is a 1985 West German comedy film directed by Doris Dörrie. It was chosen as West Germany's official submission to the 59th Academy Awards for Best Foreign Language Film, but did not manage to receive a nomination.

== Plot ==
Julius is an ambitious packaging designer, a partner in a prestigious firm. He is cheating on Paula, his wife of 12 years, with his secretary. However when, on their wedding anniversary, he discovers a love-bite on Paula's neck, his life falls apart. She admits to having a lover, who is a penniless freelance artist. Julius moves out, but finds Stefan, the artist, and contrives to share his apartment, calling himself "Daniel".

The two men become friends, drinking and discussing life in general and women in particular. When Paula comes to visit, Julius feigns eccentricity, wearing a gorilla mask the whole time and refusing to speak. Julius begins turning Stefan into a commercial artist, persuading him to give up his bohemian lifestyle and to dress and behave more like a businessman. This causes Paula to lose interest and Julius starts to win her back. Meanwhile Stefan interviews for jobs, one of which happens to be at the same design firm where Julius works.

In the final scenes, Julius and Stefan meet at work. Stefan realizes he has been deceived. The two men have a confrontation with Stefan symbolically stripping down to his underwear and Julius doing the same. They then laugh at each other. The film ends with Paula arriving at the agency, not realizing what she is about to witness.

In the office building where Julius works there is an unusual kind of elevator known as a paternoster, consisting of a continuous chain of small elevator cars that move slowly enough for people to step in and out at each floor. This is used to comic effect in the film, with Julius and Stefan having their argument in their underwear in one of the downward-traveling cars, while Paula is coming to see Julius in one of the upward cars. During the credits the crew go past in the cars as their names appear on the screen.

== Cast ==
- Heiner Lauterbach as Julius Armbrust
- Uwe Ochsenknecht as Stefan Lachner
- Ulrike Kriener as Paula Armbrust
- Janna Marangosoff as Angelika
- Dietmar Bär as Lothar
- Marie-Charlott Schüler as Marita Strass (as Marie Ch. Schüler)
- Edith Volkmann as Frau Lennart
- Monika Schwarz as Frau in der Bar
- Lois Kelz as Florian

== Reception ==
Men... was nominated for Best Foreign Film of 1986 by the US National Board of Review of Motion Pictures.

The film was the highest-grossing German film in Germany during 1986, with a gross of $20 million.

== See also ==
- The Thing About Men, an American stage musical based on the film
- List of submissions to the 59th Academy Awards for Best Foreign Language Film
- List of German submissions for the Academy Award for Best Foreign Language Film
