= Piet Klocke =

German musician and cabaret artist

- Born: Peter Klocke; 20 December 1948 (age 77); Essen, West Germany (now Germany)
- Occupations: Comedian, musician, actor, author, director
- Children: 2
- Parent(s): Jens Klocke, Maria (Lamijon) Klocke

Piet Klocke (born 20 December 1948) is a German musician, cabaret artist, author and actor. He studied philosophy and German language, but quit his studies to dedicate himself to free music theater. He has played in various blues, punk and Neue Deutsche Welle bands.

== Television and Movies ==
From 1980 on, Klocke has appeared in various TV productions and shows, including the thriller In den Todeskrallen des Dr. Do (In the Death Claws of Dr. Do) for ARD and a Saturday-night show called Flitterabend, also on ARD. He has also made various appearances on RTL Samstag Nacht and 7 Tage, 7 Köpfe.

Klocke acted as "Wachtmeister Dimpfelmoser" in the 2006 movie The Robber Hotzenplotz (with Armin Rohde), and in The Flying Classroom in 2003.

== Life ==
In an interview, Klocke named the German cabaret artist Werner Finck as one of his role models.

== Trademarks ==
Piet Klocke's trademark role is Professor Schmitt-Hindemith in his show "Musikstilarten im auslaufenden Jahrtausend" (Music styles of the Ending Millennium), where he is accompanied by saxophonist Simone Sonnenschein as Fräulein Angelika Kleinknecht. As Professor Schmitt-Hindemith, Klocke dresses eccentrically, and uses his scrubby red hair and lean figure to create an image of a helplessly nervous person, speaking in a very distracted way and leaving most of his sentences unfinished. He also often employs the Schmitt-Hindemith character in radio plays.

== Discography ==
- HipHop für Angestellte (ein musikalischer Abschlußabend in der VHS) (1995)
- Das geht alles von Ihrer Zeit ab (1997)
- Abenteuer im Dioptrinanzug (2000)
- Puffy Egborn 2 oder Scheitern als Weg! (2006)
