= Jürgen Kehrer =

German author (born 1956)

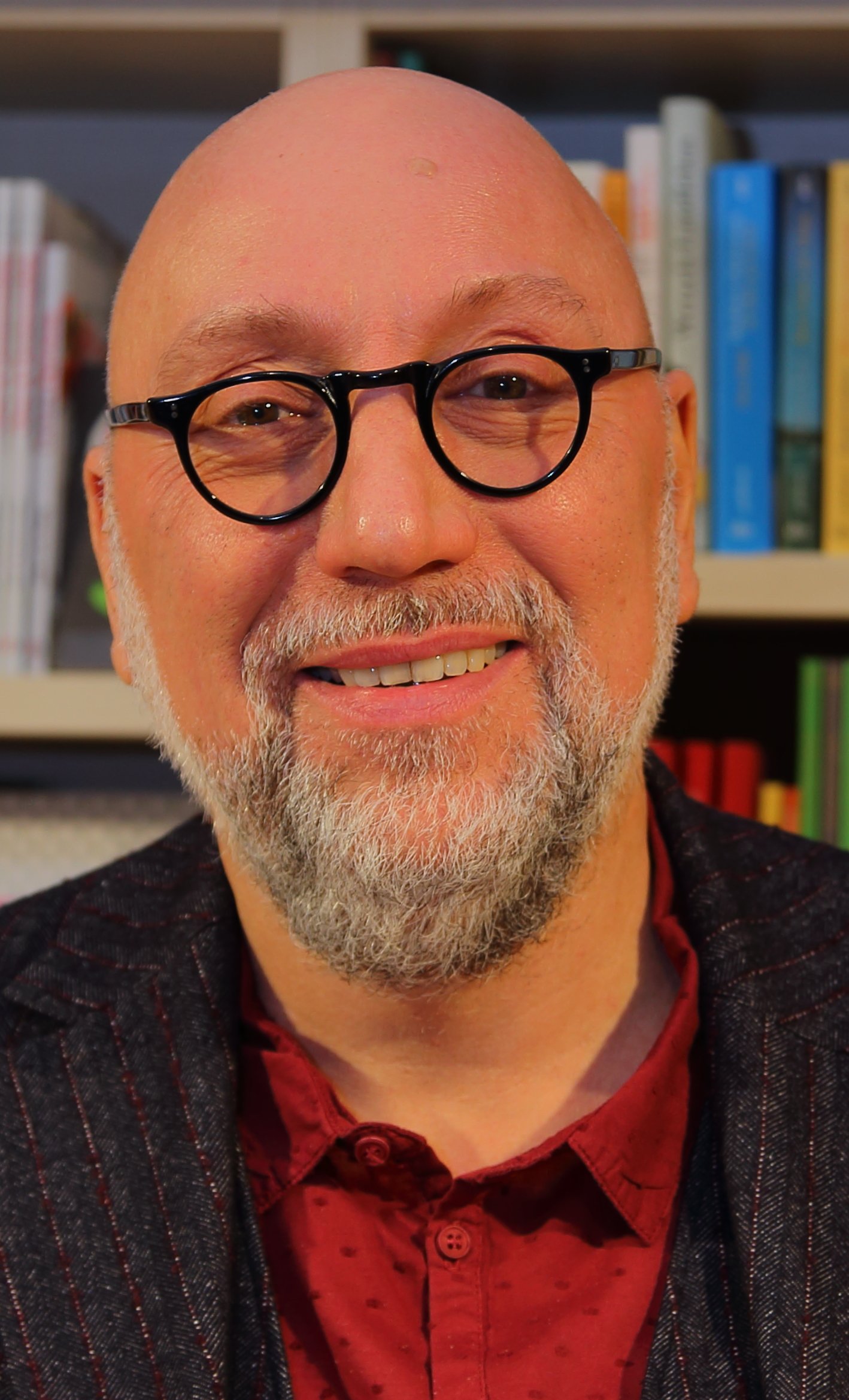
- Kehrer in 2016
- Born: 21 January 1956 (age 70); Essen, Germany
- Occupation: Author
- Years active: 1985–present

Jürgen Kehrer (born 21 January 1956) is a German author. His success led to a substantial change in German crime fiction and brought a new industry to his chosen home town of Münster.

== Life ==
Jürgen Kehrer was born in Essen in the Ruhr region and lived in this very urban part of North Rhine-Westphalia until he moved eventually to the Münster region, which is largely agricultural. His university training was in the field of education. Like many academics of his generation he was attracted by journalism and worked fourteen years as a journalist and editor before he decided to publish his first novel.

Kehrer is known for his novels about the private detective Georg Wilsberg, and their television versions. He has also published non-fiction books (as he had already done in 1985) and novels without Wilsberg. Like Arthur Conan Doyle he has also published a number of historical novels.

== Books and TV adaptations ==
Kehrer got in contact with a publishing house in the Ruhr area which had just established a new subgenre of crime fiction called "Lokalkrimi." Instead of trying to mimic American crime fiction the "Lokalkrimi" authors used a different approach, and often set stories in rather rural and unspectacular areas of Germany. Kehrer's "Und die Toten lässt man ruhen" ("And the dead ones are left in peace") was published in 1990. Avoiding clichés, it described a private detective, Wilsberg, who was not heroic and did not carry a gun. The following mystery novels about Wilsberg attracted a growing audience.

Since Kehrer created suspense without violence, Germany's ZDF found his oeuvre appropriate for their understanding of quality entertainment and in 1995 they broadcast a first TV feature film about Wilsberg. In the novels Wilsberg went through many substantial, nearly epic personal changes, which made it difficult to use them as the basis for a TV series. Eventually a concept was found, and actor Leonard Lansink succeeded the initial actor playing the principal role. The original character changed in many respects when he was adapted for the TV screen, a fate that befell already for example Arsène Lupin and The Saint. But unlike Georges Descrières or Roger Moore, who portrayed Lupin and the Saint, respectively, the German actor Leonard Lansink is appreciated by all fans of the protagonist in question, and Jürgen Kehrer has endorsed the TV series, even appearing in cameo roles.

== Impact ==
Kehrer's success has inspired numerous authors to write their own novels about local private detectives and journalists who investigate in their own region. Hitherto it had been a popular belief that a German crime fiction author could only succeed with an English pen name and an Anglo-Saxon protagonist. Kehrer revealed that this was a misbelief.

Besides the landscape of German crime fiction also Münster and its image throughout Germany have evolved. Film industry has become a lasting part of Münster's economy. This is underpinned by another crime fiction series within the TV series Tatort that likewise presents Münster. Tourists coming to Münster for sightseeing can book guided tours including sites associated with Kehrer's novels and their adaptations.
