= Nobody Loves Me (film) =

1994 German film

- Theatrical release poster
- Directed by: Doris Dörrie
- Written by: Doris Dörrie
- Starring: Maria Schrader; Pierre Sanoussi-Bliss
- Cinematography: Helge Weindler
- Edited by: Inez Regnier
- Music by: Niki Reiser
- Production company: Cobra Film
- Distributed by: Buena Vista International
- Release date: 7 November 1994
- Running time: 104 minutes
- Country: Germany
- Language: German

Nobody Loves Me (German: Keiner liebt mich) is a 1994 German comedy-drama film directed by Doris Dörrie.

== Plot ==
On the brink of her 30th birthday Fanny Fink (Maria Schrader) is desperate because she has been unable to find love. Things begin to change when she meets Orfeo (Pierre Sanoussi-Bliss).

== Cast ==
- Maria Schrader - Fanny Fink
- Pierre Sanoussi-Bliss - Orfeo de Altamar
- Michael von Au - Lothar Sticker
- Elisabeth Trissenaar - Madeleine
- Joachim Król - Anton
- Ingo Naujoks - Lasse Laengsfeld
- Peggy Parnass - Frau Radebrecht
