= Armin Rohde =

German actor (born 1955)

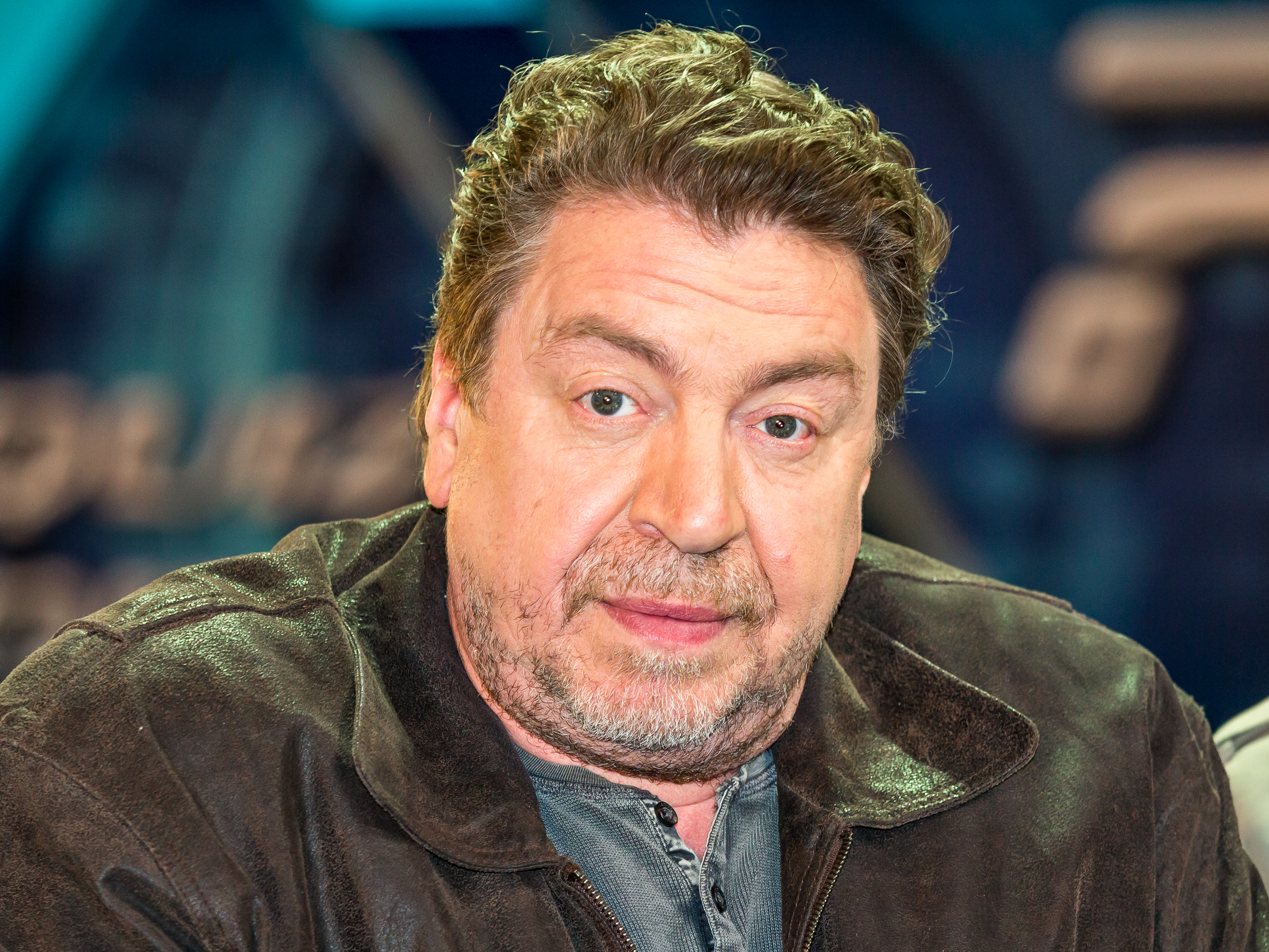
- Armin Rohde, 2016
- Born: 4 April 1955 (age 71); Gladbeck, West Germany

Armin Rohde (born 4 April 1955) is a German actor and voice actor.

He was born in Gladbeck.

== Filmography ==
Year	Title	Role	Notes
1992	Schtonk!	SS man	Credited as Armin Rhode
1992	Little Sharks	Bierchen	
1994	Der bewegte Mann	Metzger	
1997	Life is All You Get	Harri	
1998	Run Lola Run	Herr Schuster	
1999	St. Pauli Night	Manfred	
1999	Apokalypso	Karl Mroszek	TV film
2000	Marlene	Emil Jannings	
2003	A Light in Dark Places	Jürgen Grabowski	TV film
2005	A Sound of Thunder	John Wallenbeck	
2006	The Robber Hotzenplotz	Hotzenplotz	
2008	Schade um das schöne Geld	Walter Zotebier	TV film
2008	Freche Mädchen	Rumpelstilzchen	
2008	Zwei Weihnachtsmänner	Weihnachtsmann Erwin	TV film
2008	Age and Beauty	Bernhard	
2009	Cutlet for Three	Günther Kuballa	TV film
2009	Saviors in the Night	Menne Spiegel	
2009	Volcano	Walter Röhricht	TV film
2010	Jew Suss: Rise and Fall	Heinrich George	
2011	Contagion	Damian Leopold	
2012	Famous Five	Peters	
2012	The Marriage Swindler and His Wife	Herbert Krugschenk	TV film
2013	Heroes	Willi Wieczorek	TV film
2013	The White Horse Inn	Wilhelm Giesecke	
2014	The Ingredients of Love	Jean-Paul Monisignac	TV film

TV series
Year	Title	Role	Notes
1996	The Shadow Man	Lasky	TV miniseries
since 2003	Nachtschicht	Erich Bo Erichsen	16 episodes

== Audiobooks ==
- 1999: Roger Graf: Philip Maloney – Auf der Flucht, Die Armbanduhr and Der Mörderhai, publisher: Tandem Verlag, ISBN 978-3833191886
- 2006: Roger Graf: Philip Maloney – Die Leiche im Moor – ISBN 978-3-8331-0699-6
- 2007: Barbara Kindermann: Götz von Berlichingen – ISBN 978-3-9393-7528-9
- 2008: Michael Chabon: Die Vereinigung jiddischer Polizisten – ISBN 978-3-7857-3750-7
- 2012: Otfried Preußler: Die Räuber-Hotzenplotz-Edition – ISBN 978-3-8623-1213-9
- 2017: G. F. Unger: Verlorene Stadt, publisher: Lübbe Audio – ISBN 978-3785755273
- 2017: G. F. Unger: Jamie und Clyde, publisher: Lübbe Audio – ISBN 978-3785755242
- 2017: G. F. Unger: Texas-Marshal, publisher: Lübbe Audio – ISBN 978-3785755266
- 2017: G. F. Unger: Flucht durch den Blizzard, publisher: Lübbe Audio – ISBN 978-3785755235
- 2017: G. F. Unger: Pferdejäger, publisher: Lübbe Audio – ISBN 978-3785755259
- 2017: G. F. Unger: Die Gun-Sisters, publisher: Lübbe Audio – ISBN 978-3785755211
- 2026: J.K. Rowling: Harry Potter und der Stein der Weisen (Hörbuch mit voller Besetzung), Pottermore Publishing and Audible Studios, as Rubeus Hagrid (Full Cast audiobook, Harry Potter and the Philosopher's Stone, Audible (service))

== Publications ==
- Armin Rohde: Größenwahn und Lampenfieber. Die Wahrheit über Schauspieler. (Autobiography) Publisher: rowohlt, Reinbek 2009, ISBN 978-3-499-62501-5
