= Michael Eissenhauer =

German art historian

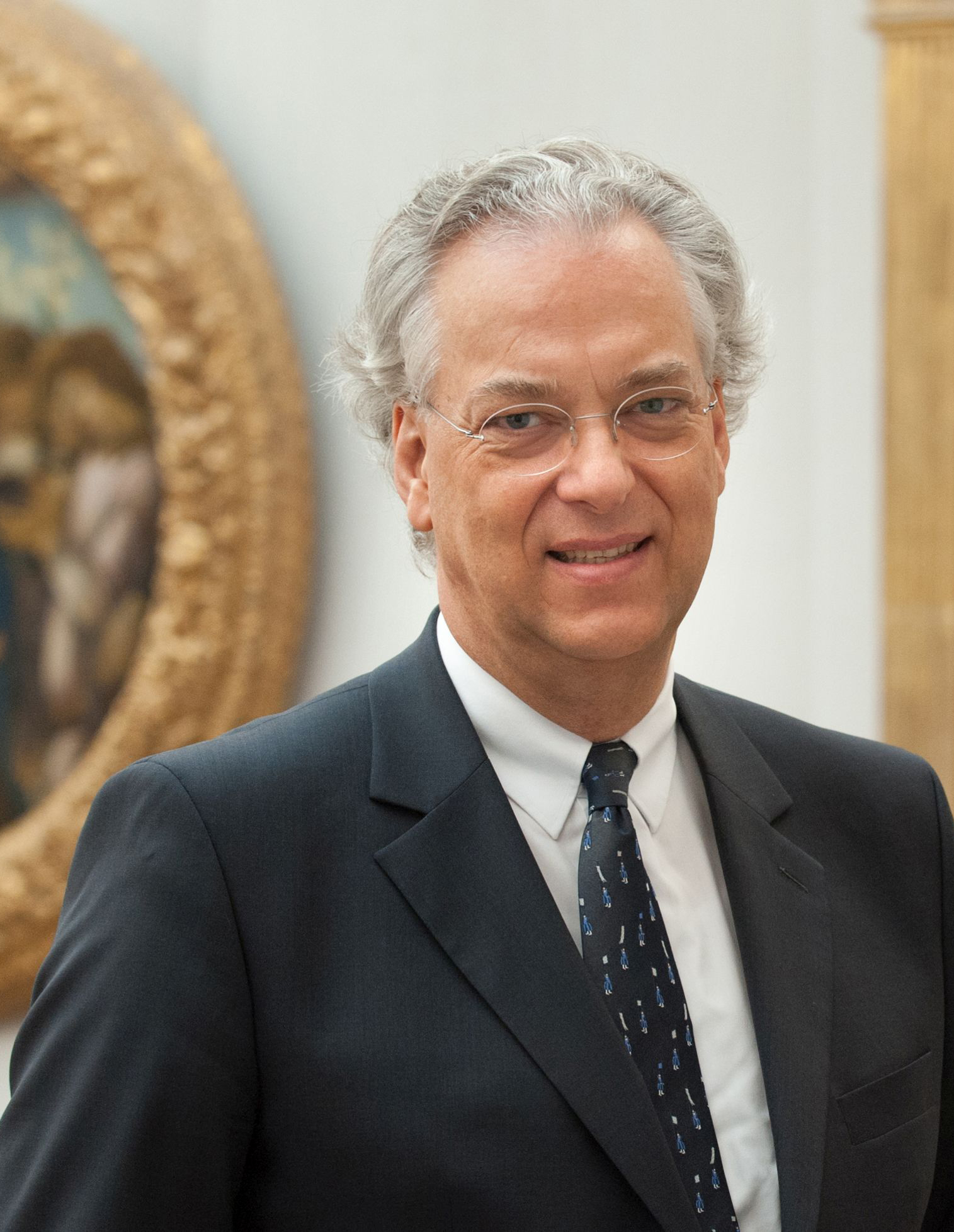
Michael Eissenhauer in the Gemäldegalerie, 2015

Michael Eissenhauer (born 28 November 1956 in Stuttgart) is a German art historian and was director-general of the Staatliche Museen zu Berlin.

== Biography ==
After gaining his Abitur (school-leaving certificate) in 1975, Michael Eissenhauer completed two years of training as a cabinetmaker before going on to study art history, classical archaeology and German literature in Tübingen and Hamburg. He received both a master's degree (1983) and a PhD (1985) from the University of Hamburg. After working as a research trainee at the Germanisches Nationalmuseum in Nuremberg (1987–1989), he became a researcher at the Deutsches Historisches Museum in Berlin (1989–1990), returning to the Germanisches Nationalmuseum as a curator from 1991 to 1995.

From 1995 to 2001 he was director of the Kunstsammlungen der Veste Coburg, and then, until 2008, director of the Museumslandschaft Hessen Kassel, which was restructured and considerably expanded under his leadership.

From 2002 to 2007, Michael Eissenhauer was a member of the Committee of ICOM Deutschland and from 2003 to 2010, president of the Deutscher Museumsbundes.

In December 2007, the Board of the Stiftung Preußischer Kulturbesitz appointed Michael Eissenhauer to succeed Peter-Klaus Schuster as director-general of the Staatliche Museen zu Berlin. He held this position from 31 October 2008 until retirement on 30 September 2022. On 1 August 2016 he also took over the post of director of the Gemäldegalerie and Skulpturensammlung at the Staatliche Museen zu Berlin. During his tenure, on the one hand, he is perceived as a "cultural manager", but on the other hand, it has been repeatedly stated that the Staatliche Museen zu Berlin need "a creative manager, not an administrator".

Since the winter semester of 2012/2013, Michael Eissenhauer has been teaching at the Institut für Kunst- und Bildgeschichte (IKB) at the Humboldt-Universität zu Berlin. The university made him an honorary professor in 2016.

== Major works ==
- Die Hamburger Wohnstiftungen des 19. Jahrhunderts : "Ein Denkmal, welches theilnehmende Liebe gestiftet hat ..." (in German), Hamburg: Christians, 1987, ISBN 3-7672-1010-X
- "Das Humboldt-Forum im Schloss: Konzept und Ansatz", Museumskunde (in German), vol. 75, no. 2, Berlin, pp. 20-24, 2010, ISSN 0027-4178
- Eissenhauer, Michael, ed. (2019), Gemäldegalerie: 200 Masterpieces of European Painting, Leipzig: E.A. Seemann Henschel, ISBN 978-3-86502-416-9
