= Jimi Blue Ochsenknecht =

German actor

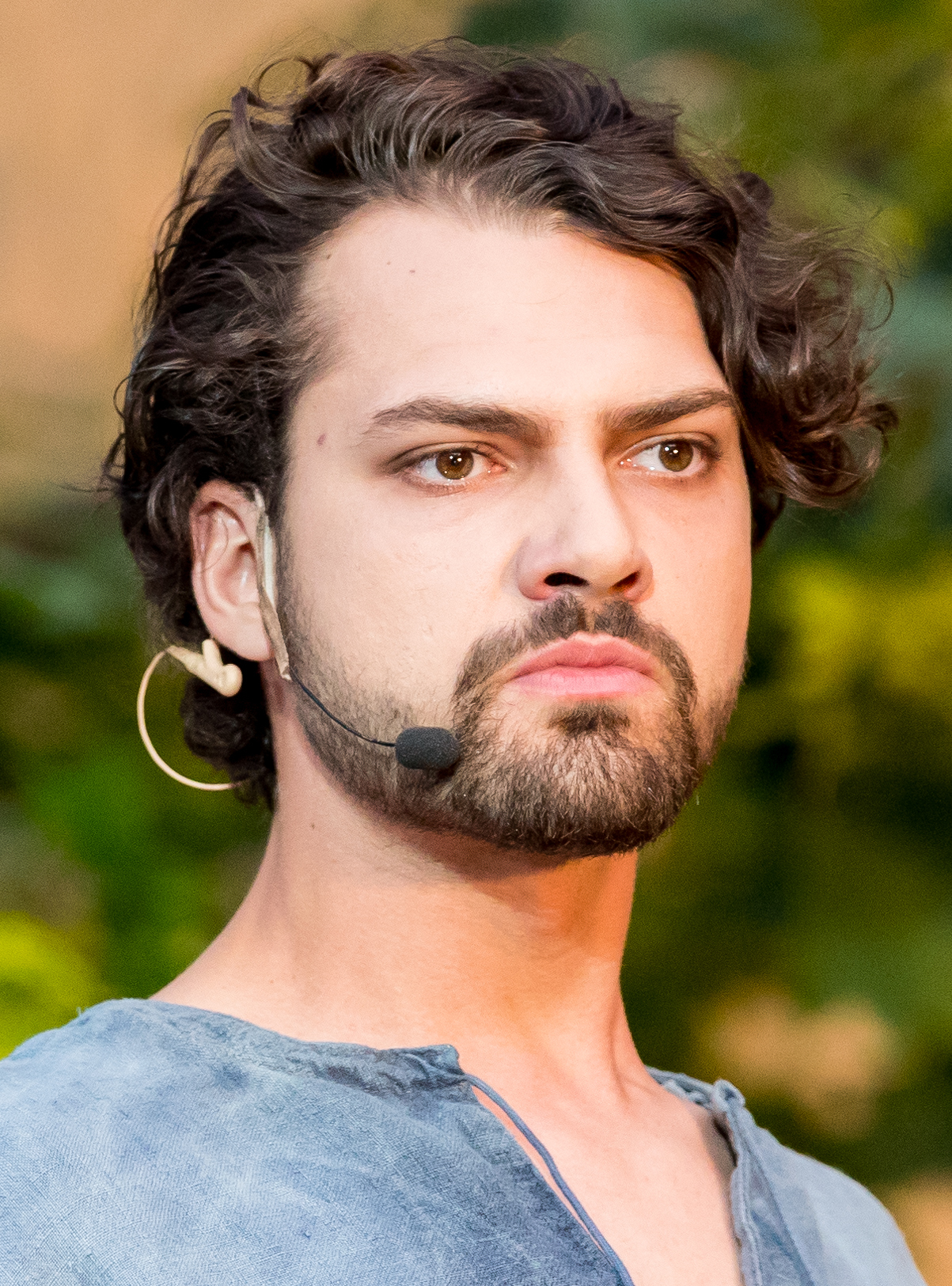
Ochsenknecht in 2018

Jimi Blue Ochsenknecht (born 27 December 1991) is a German actor and musician.

== Early life ==
Ochsenknecht was born in Munich to actor Uwe Ochsenknecht and actress Natascha Ochsenknecht. He has an older brother, Wilson Gonzalez Ochsenknecht and a younger sister.

== Career ==
In Germany, Ochsenknecht works as an actor in film and television productions. He is best known for his role as character Leon in German production Die Wilden Kerle. This film is based on the children's book series Die Wilden Fußballkerle (The Wild Soccer Bunch) by Joachim Masannek, who also directed the film.

== Filmography ==
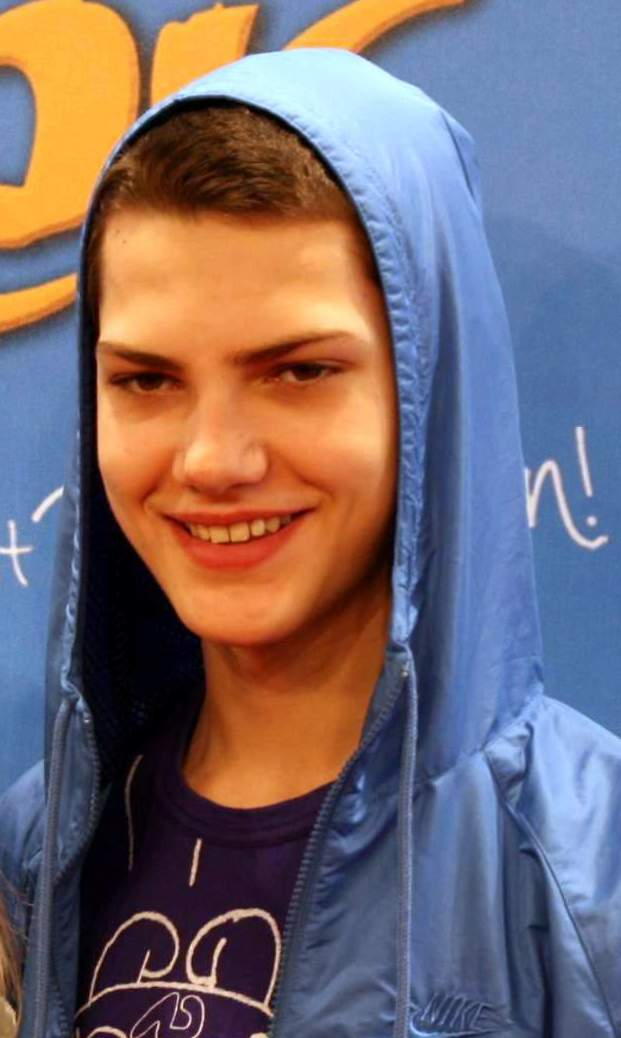
Ochsenknecht in 2008

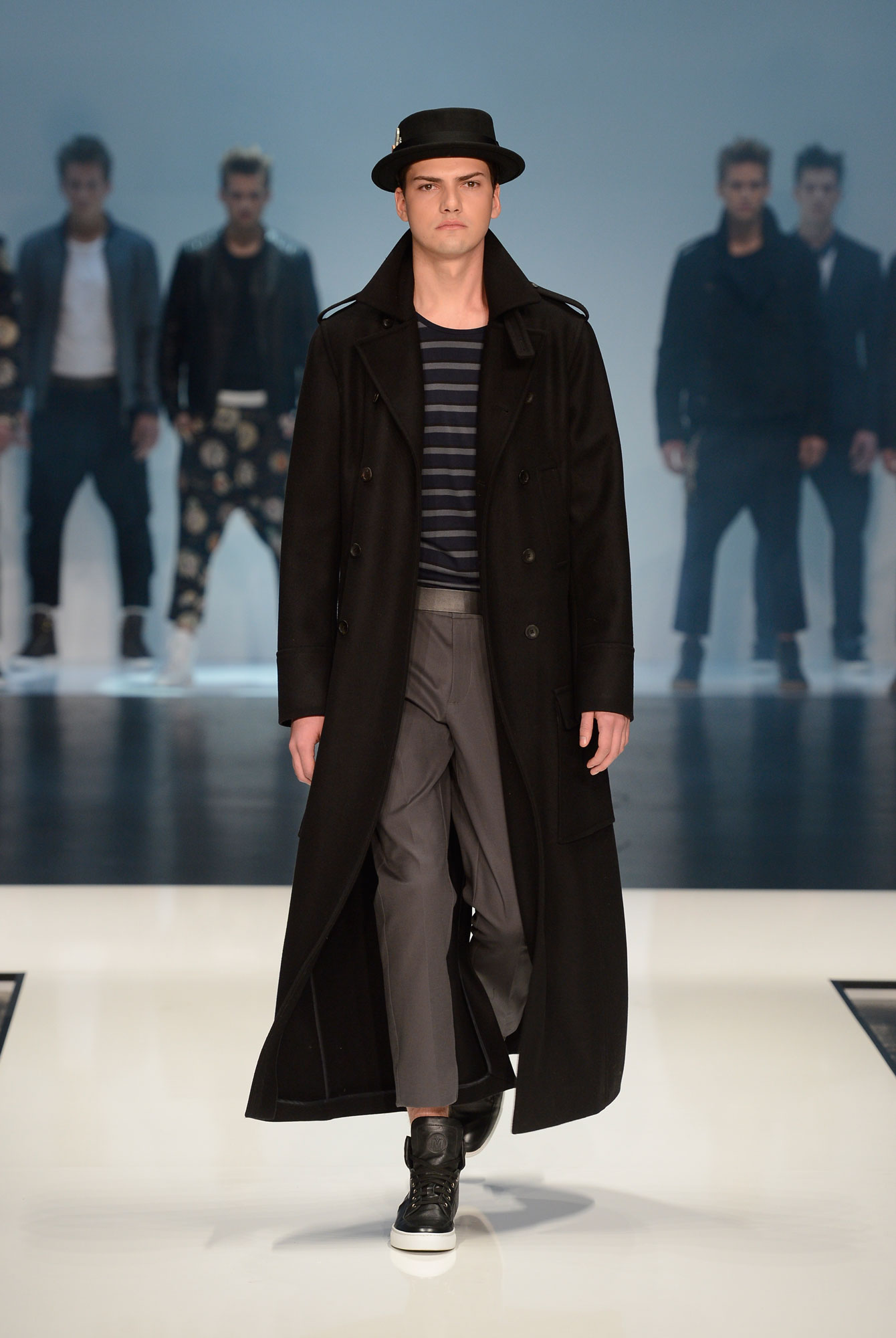
Ochsenknecht as a model

- 2000: Enlightenment Guaranteed
- 2003: The Wild Soccer Bunch
- 2005: Auf den Spuren der Vergangenheit (TV film)
- 2005: The Wild Soccer Bunch 2
- 2006: The Wild Soccer Bunch 3
- 2007: The Wild Soccer Bunch 4
- 2008: The Wild Soccer Bunch 5
- 2008: Summer
- 2009: Gangs
- 2011: Homies
- 2012: Der Kriminalist: Schamlos (TV)
- 2012: Star Race
- 2012: Little Murders
- 2012: Notruf Hafenkante: Wutbürger (TV), as Luiz
- 2013: SPOT "No Loverboys"
- 2014: Die Familiendetektivin: Der verlorene Sohn (TV)
- 2016: The Old Fox: Machtgefühle (TV)
- 2016: The Wild Soccer Bunch 6: The Legend Lives!
- 2016: Unter anderen Umständen: Das Versprechen (TV)

== Awards ==
- 2004: Undine Award – Best film debutant for The Wild Soccer Bunch
- 2005: Bravo Otto in bronze – Category cinema stars male
- 2006: Bravo Otto in silver – Category actor
- 2007: Bravo Otto in gold – Category singer; and bronze – Category actor
- 2007: Jetix Award Coolster TV-star
- 2008: Steiger Award 2008 Nachwuchs
- 2008: New Faces Award
- 2009: DIVA AWARD – New Talent of the Year 2008
- 2010: ECHO Gold Award for the Album "Mission Blue"

== Music ==
- January 2008: Mission Blue (studio album)
- October 2008: Sick Like That (studio album)
