= Carmen Nebel =

German television presenter (born 1956)

Carmen Nebel (born 24 July 1956 in Grimma, then East Germany) is a German television presenter.

Nebel majored in German studies, English studies and pedagogy at Humboldt University of Berlin. After completing her degree she began appearing on GDR television, working for Deutscher Fernsehfunk (DFF) throughout the 1980s. In 1989 she hosted her own television show Sprungbrett. After the fall of the Berlin Wall and German reunification she worked for German broadcasters ARD, NDR and MDR. From June 1994 to 2003 she presented the Schlager show Feste der Volksmusik on ARD. She has been presenting Willkommen bei Carmen Nebel and Die schönsten Weihnachts-Hits since January 2004 on ZDF. Nebel lives in Berlin and has one child.

== Awards ==
- 2006: Goldene Kamera
- 2009: Order of Merit of the Federal Republic of Germany
