= Uwe Ochsenknecht =

German actor and singer (born 1956)

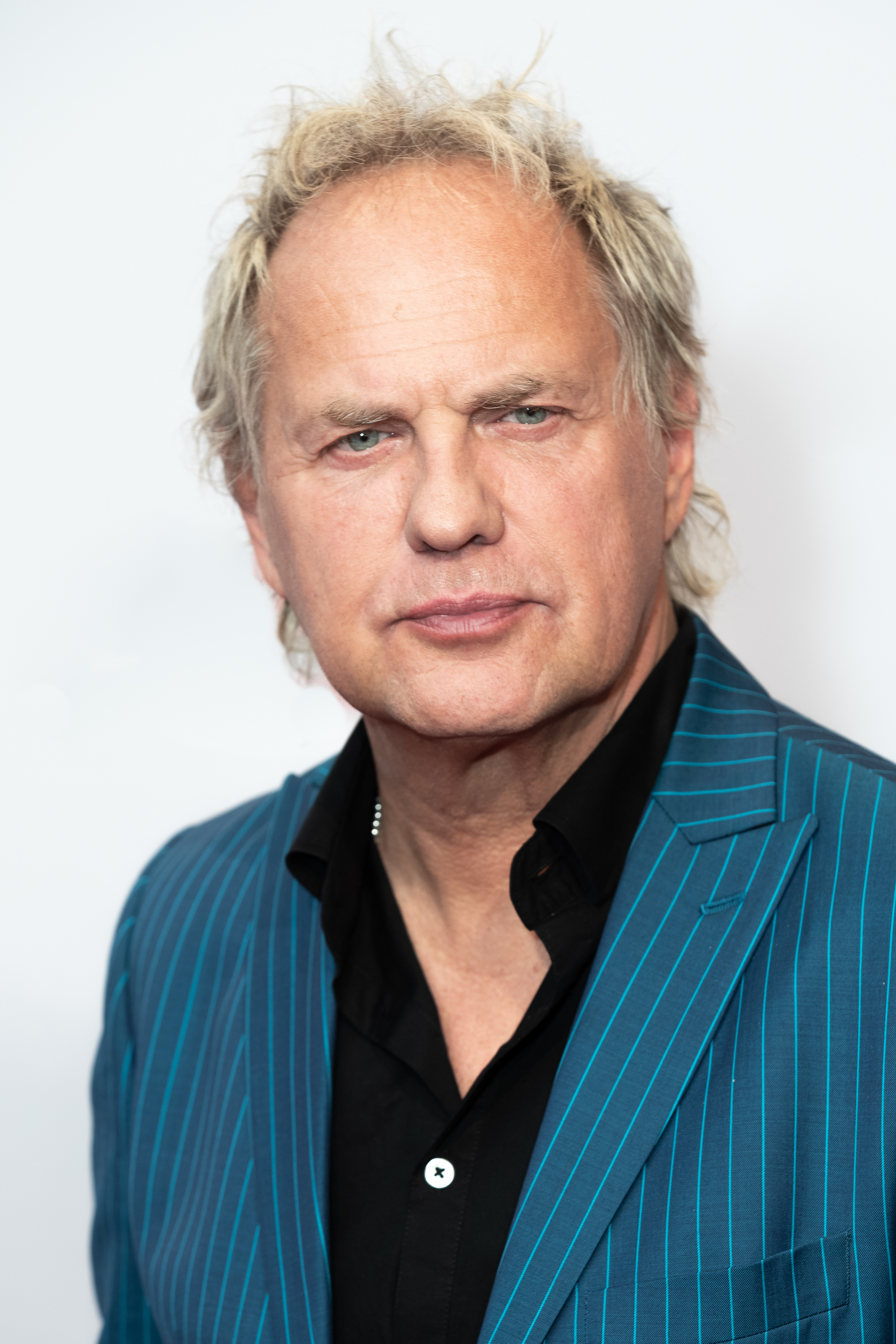
- Ochsenknecht in 2019
- Born: Uwe Adam Ochsenknecht; 7 January 1956 (age 70); Biblis, West Germany
- Occupations: Actor, singer
- Years active: 1978–present
- Spouses: Natascha Ochsenknecht (m. 1993–2012) Kiki Viebrock (m. 2017)

Uwe Adam Ochsenknecht (German pronunciation: [ˈuːvə ˈʔɔksn̩ˌknɛçt]; born 7 January 1956) is a German actor and singer.

== Career ==
Films Ochsenknecht has starred in include Das Boot (1981), Schtonk! (1992), and the TV miniseries Frank Herbert's Dune (2000).

In the early 1990s, he gained a second foothold in music. He has since released several albums; he is a singer in the band The Screen, while Mick Rogers (Manfred Mann's Earth Band) and Thomas Blug are guitar players. The two ex-musicians of Gary Moore's band Pete Rees (bass) and Graham Walker (drums) are also represented.

Ochsenknecht stars in the television film series Der Bulle und das Landei, playing a police commissioner who was transferred to the rural Eifel area, at irregular intervals since 2009.

== Personal life ==
Ochsenknecht was married to Natascha Ochsenknecht until 2012 and has three children with her: sons Wilson Gonzalez Ochsenknecht (b. 1990) and Jimi Blue Ochsenknecht (b. 1991), who are both actors, and daughter Cheyenne Savannah Ochsenknecht (b. 2000). His oldest son, Rocco Stark, is from an earlier girlfriend. Wilson and Jimi Ochsenknecht acted together with him in the films Enlightenment Guaranteed and The Wild Soccer Bunch and its four sequels.

In July 2017, Ochsenknecht married Kiki Viebrock.

== Awards ==
- 1999 Bavarian Film Awards, Best Actor

== Filmography ==
Year	Title	Role	Notes
1978	Die Straße	Bully	TV miniseries
1979	Uns reicht das nicht	Jörg	TV film
1979	Das Ding	Engelchen	TV film
1980	Derrick: Tödliche Sekunden	Achim Rudolf	TV series episode
1980	Tatort: Schönes Wochenende	Oebel	TV series episode
1981	St. Pauli-Landungsbrücken: Die Kompagnons	Thomas	TV series episode
1981	Das Boot	Bootsmann Lamprecht	
1982	Tatort: Wat Recht is, mutt Recht bliewen	Fritz Lehmann	TV series episode
1983	Die Zeiten ändern sich	Kajott	TV miniseries
1983	Büro, Büro	Martin Bohle	TV series, 8 episodes
1984	Tatort: Verdeckte Ermittlung	Klaus	TV series episode
1985	Parker	Boots Man	
1985	The Record	Rico	
1985	Die Sache ist gelaufen	Jürgen Weck	
1985	Forget Mozart	Director Emanuel Schikaneder	
1985	Der Fahnder: Liebe macht blind	Norbert	TV series episode
1985	Men...	Stefan Lachner	
1986	Operation Dead End	Boris	
1986	Die Krimistunde: Ein Toter zuviel	Joe Hemmer	TV series episode
1986	The Lenz Papers	Rinckleff	TV miniseries
1986	Irgendwie und Sowieso: Manhattan	General, son of Hermann Göring	TV series episode
1987	Tatort: Blindflug	Günter Marbach	TV series episode
1987	Rotlicht!	Uwe Rühle	
1988	Die Dollarfalle	Dani	TV film
1989	The Voice	Patrick	
1989	Money	Werner Mueller	
1990	Bread and Butter	Stefan	
1990	Bismarck	Otto von Bismarck	TV film
1990	Fire, Ice and Dynamite	Victor	
1991	Ein Fall für zwei: Helens Geheimnisse	Bruno Maschke	TV series episode
1991	All Out	Paul	
1992	Schtonk!	Fritz Knobel (based on Konrad Kujau)	
1992	Auf Achse: Musa und Marie	Benno	TV series episode
1992	Tatort: Der Mörder und der Prinz	René Wolf	TV series episode
1993	Pauline In Between	Klaus Klett	
1994	Kaspar Hauser	Louis I, Grand Duke of Baden	
1994	Mona Must Die	Eddie von Snead	
1994	Simply Love	Teacher Pillgrimm	
1994	The Wanderer: False Witness	Brandt	TV series episode
1994	Felidae	Archie	voice only
1995	The Way to Dusty Death	Gerhard Tracchia	TV film
1995	Die Straßen von Berlin	Hajo Kroll	TV series, 4 episodes
1996	Das Zauberbuch	Griffig	
1996	Honigmond	Burton	
1997	Die Gang	Joe Feddersen	TV series, 13 episodes
1997	Ballermann 6	Rocker	
1997	Christmas Fever	Fritz Mauser	
1998	Widows – Erst die Ehe, dann das Vergnügen	Erich Dollinger	
1998	Tödliches Alibi	Konrad Grothe	TV film
1998	Am I Beautiful?	Bodo	
1998	Weekend mit Leiche	Tom	TV film
1998	Operation Noah	Kommissar Taller	TV film
1999	Diplomatic Siege	Col. Peter Vojnovic \ Giorgio Borghelli	
1999	Bodyguard – Dein Leben in meiner Hand	Gilbert Metz	TV film
2000	Stan Becker: Ein Mann ein Wort	Gilles Donzelot	TV series episode
2000	Enlightenment Guaranteed	Uwe	
2000	Fußball ist unser Leben	Hans Pollak	
2000	Siska: Das letzte Konzert	Rolf Gillis	TV series episode
2000	Dune – The Desert Planet	Stilgar	TV miniseries
2000	The Old Fox: Der letzte Geburtstag	Klaus Wollgast	TV series episode
2001	L'impero	Arcadin	TV miniseries
2001	Küss mich, Tiger!	Prof. Hardy Popp	TV film
2001	Vera Brühne	Johann Ferbach	TV miniseries
2001	Stones of Light	Thomas Kesselbach	TV film
2001	The Crusaders	Baron Corrado	TV film
2001	Siska: Hass macht blind	Gert Kranitz	TV series episode
2002	Harte Brötchen	Theo Zerrbeck	TV film
2003	Nachtschicht: Amok!	Randy Schlosser	TV series episode
2003	The Wild Soccer Bunch	Maxi's father	
2003	Luther	Pope Leo X	
2004	Engelchen flieg	Michael Koller	TV film
2004	Der Bulle von Tölz: Der Tölzi	Sepp Schorlemmer	TV series episode
2005	About the Looking for and the Finding of Love	Theo Stokowski	
2005	The Wild Soccer Bunch 2	Maxi's father	
2005	The Wedding Party	Franz Berger	
2006	Atomised	Bruno's father	
2006	The Wild Soccer Bunch 3	Maxi's father	
2006	Tollpension	Kurt Mahlström	TV film
2006	Der beste Lehrer der Welt	Teacher Gustav Kilian	TV film
2007	The Wild Soccer Bunch 4	Maxi's father	
2007	Kein Geld der Welt	Mr. Dagenhorst	TV film
2007	Siska: Sei still und stirb	Fred Wiechert	TV series episode
2007	Liebe nach Rezept	Hansen Quaas	TV film
2007	Angsthasen	Psychotherapeut Dr. Elmau	TV film
2007	Why Men Don't Listen and Women Can't Read Maps	Jonathan Armbruster	
2008	Mord in aller Unschuld	Roland Nickel	TV film
2008	Summer	Tim's father	
2008	Run for Your Life!	Oscar	
2008	The Old Fox: Die Nacht kommt schneller als du denkst	Harald Plenzberg	TV series episode
2008	Crash	Father	Short
2008	Schade um das schöne Geld	Klaas Jonkers	TV film
2008	The Letter for the King	Rafox	
2008	Ein Ferienhaus in Marrakesch	Kurt Basinski	TV film
2008	Mein Schüler, seine Mutter & ich	Teacher Carlo Brückner	TV film
2009	A Date for Life	Micha Strelinsky	TV film
2009	Männersache	Susi's father	
2009	Lippels Traum	Konrektor Färber / Innkeeper	
2009	Böses Erwachen	Freddy Amberg	TV film
2009	Zweiohrküken	Dr. Eisenberger	
2010	Greed	Leon Grünlich	TV film
2010	Zeiten ändern dich	Selina's father	
2010	Der Bulle und das Landei: Tödliches Heimweh	Polizeihauptkommissar Killmer	TV series episode
2010	Amigo	Fritz Declair	TV film
2011	The Great Comeback	Hansi Haller	TV film
2011	Der Bulle und das Landei: Babyblues	Polizeihauptkommissar Killmer	TV series episode
2011	Schief gewickelt	Möbius	TV film
2012	Überleben an der Wickelfront	Dieter Lindemann	TV film
2012	Little Murders	Wilhelm Brinkhoff	
2013	Das kleine Gespenst	Bürgermeister	
2014	Nena	Martin	
2015	Big Fish, Small Fish	Paul Grambauer	TV film
2015	Die Udo Honig Story	Udo Honig	TV film
2015	Unfinished Business	Maarten Daaervk	American box-office film
2016	Welcome to Germany	Dr. Sascha Heinrich	
2017	Anna Fucking Molnar	Wolf	
2018	A Jar Full of Life	Peter Ruge	
2019	Ich war noch niemals in New York	Otto	
