= Wilson Gonzalez Ochsenknecht =

German actor (born 1990)

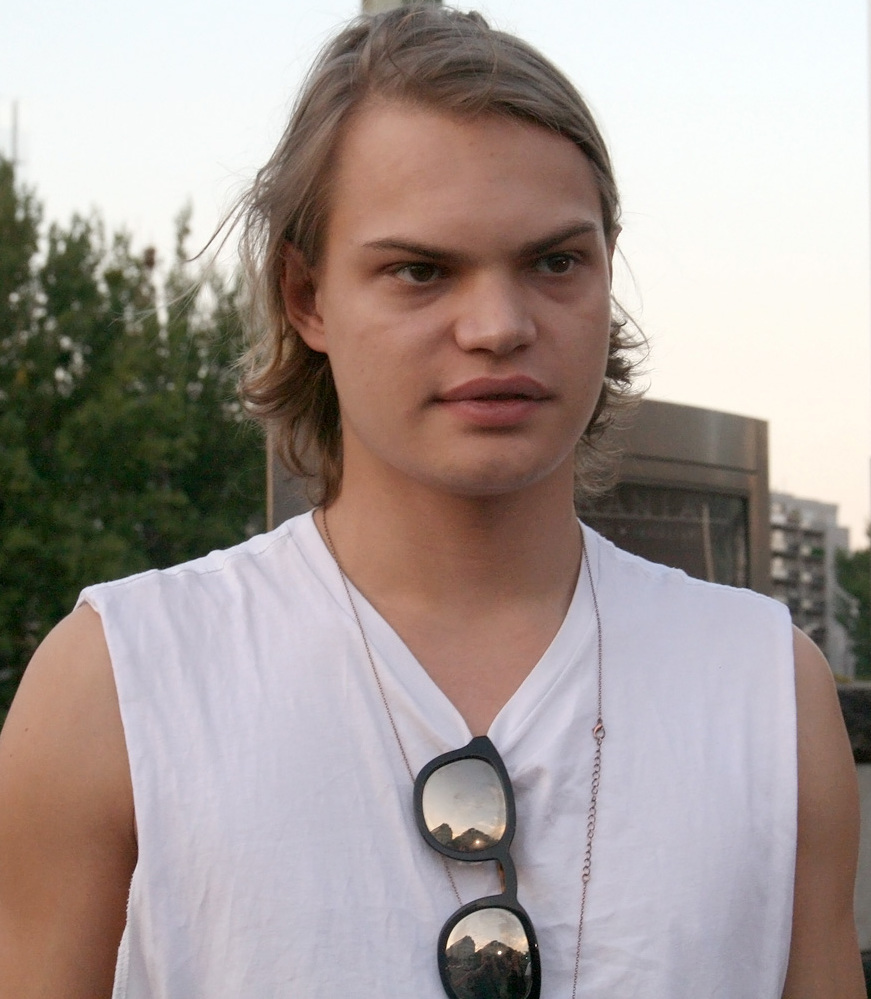
- Ochsenknecht in 2012
- Born: 18 March 1990 (age 36); Munich, West Germany
- Occupation: Actor
- Years active: 1999–present

Wilson Gonzalez Ochsenknecht (born 18 March 1990) is a German actor. He has appeared in more than twenty films since 1999. His father, Uwe Ochsenknecht, is also an actor. He has a younger brother, Jimi Blue Ochsenknecht, and a younger sister, Cheyenne Savanna Ochsenknecht.

== Selected filmography ==
Year	Title	Role	Notes
2003	The Wild Soccer Bunch	Marlon	
2005	The Wild Soccer Bunch 2	Marlon	
2006	The Wild Soccer Bunch 3	Marlon	
2007	The Wild Soccer Bunch 4	Marlon	
2008	Freche Mädchen	Brian	
2009	Gangs	Chris	
2010	Habermann	Hans Habermann	
2015	Punk Berlin 1982	Schwarz	
2015	The Nightmare	Adam	
2016	The Wild Soccer Bunch 6: The Legend Lives!	Marlon	
2018	Lords of Chaos	Varg's driver	Nameless character; he is essentially Snorre "Blackthorn" Ruch but not credited as such for legal reasons.
