= List of women classical pianists =

The following is a list of notable women classical pianists by nationality – notable women who are well known for their work in the field of classical music.

== Albania ==
- Edlira Dedja (fl. 1990s), pianist, art critic and opera promotor

== Argentina ==
- Martha Argerich (born 1941), concert pianist, recording artist and virtuoso icon
- Ingrid Fliter (born 1973), classical pianist and recording artist
- Violeta Hemsy de Gainza (born 1929), pianist and educator
- Sylvia Kersenbaum (born 1945), pianist, composer and educator

== Armenia ==
- Nareh Arghamanyan (born 1989), award-winning classical pianist
- Svetlana Navasardyan (born 1946), classical concert pianist
- Varduhi Yeritsyan (born 1981), concert pianist now based in France

== Australia ==
- Rebecca Chambers (born 1975) concert pianist, teacher, Director of Kidko Performing Arts
- Vera Bradford (1904–2004), pianist and teacher
- Tamara-Anna Cislowska, performing pianist and radio host
- Lucinda Collins (fl. 1980s), pianist, educator, chamber musician
- Anna Goldsworthy (born 1974), writer, pianist and teacher
- Sonya Hanke (1933–1993), pianist and educator
- Miriam Hyde (1913–2005), composer, pianist, educator and poet
- Maureen Jones (born 1927), pianist
- Eileen Joyce (1908–1991), distinguished concert pianist
- Elena Kats-Chernin (born 1957), pianist and composer
- Stephanie McCallum (born 1956), pianist and teacher
- Hephzibah Menuhin (1920–1981), American-Australian pianist, writer and human rights activist
- Lisa Moore (born 1960), pianist
- Ariel Shearer (born c.1905), composer and classical pianist
- Kathryn Selby (born 1962), pianist
- Constance Brandon Usher (fl. 1900s), classical pianist
- Natasha Vlassenko (born 1956), Russian-Australian concert pianist and educator
- Nancy Weir (1915–2008), pianist and educator
- Sally Whitwell (born 1974), pianist and composer

== Austria ==
- Luna Alcalay (1928–2012), Croatian-born Austrian pianist, music educator and composer
- Ilse von Alpenheim (born 1927), international classical pianist and chamber musician focusing on early romantic composers
- Marianna Auenbrugger (1759–1782), pianist and composer who studied under Haydn and Salieri
- Josepha Barbara Auernhammer (1758–1820), pianist who studied under Mozart
- Donka Angatscheva (born 1979), Austrian pianist of Bulgarian descent
- Jeanette Antonie Bürde (1799–1875), Austrian pianist, singer and teacher, career mostly in Berlin
- Ingrid Haebler (1929–2023), international concert pianist and recording artist
- Cornelia Herrmann (born 1977), pianist and chamber musician
- Anastasia Huppmann (born 1988), Russian-born Austrian concert pianist
- Mathilde Kralik (1857–1944), pianist and composer
- Christiana Lin (fl. 1980s), Taiwanese-born Austrian pianist and harpsichordist
- Henriette von Pereira-Arnstein (1780–1859), Austrian pianist and salon-holder
- Barbara Ployer (born 1765), piano and composition pupil of Mozart
- Lisa Smirnova (born 1972), Russian-born Austrian pianist

== Azerbaijan ==
- Yegana Akhundova (born 1960), pianist, composer and educator
- Khadija Gayibova (1893–1938), pianist and educator who played the Azeri mugham

== Belarus ==
- Marina Osman (born 1965), classical and jazz concert pianist
- Hanna Shybayeva (born 1979), concert pianist and chamber musician

== Belgium ==
- Eugénie-Emilie Juliette Folville (1870–1946), pianist, violinist, educators, conductor and composer
- Jacqueline Fontyn (born 1930), contemporary composer, pianist and music educator
- Irina Lankova (born 1977), Russian-Belgian concert pianist and recording artist
- Flore Levine-Cousyns (1898–1989), concert pianist and educator
- Marcelle Mercenier (1920–1996), pianist and educator
- Jeanne-Catherine Pauwels (1795–1889), pianist who performed in Brussels salons
- Janine Reding (1920–2015), pianist who performed internationally in piano duos
- Éliane Reyes (born 1977), pianist, chamber musician and educator
- Edna Stern (born 1977), Belgian-Israeli pianist and educator now based in London

== Bolivia ==
- Mariana Alandia (fl. 2000s), classical pianist keen on Bolivian composers

== Bosnia and Herzegovina ==
- Milica Pap (born 1973), classical pianist and educator
- Dženana Šehanović (born 1991), educator and professional pianist

== Brazil ==
- Yara Bernette (1920–2002), internationally acclaimed classical pianist
- Helza Cameu (1903–1995), composer, pianist, musicologist and writer
- Dinorá de Carvalho (c.1905–1980), pianist, conductor, music educator and composer
- Jocy de Oliveira (born 1936), pianist, multimedia artist, and composer
- Chiquinha Gonzaga (1847–1935), composer, pianist and conductor
- Débora Halász (fl. 1990s), classical pianist, harpsichordist and educator
- Clelia Iruzun (fl. 1988), concert pianist based in London
- Clarisse Leite (1917–2003), composer, pianist and educator.
- Guiomar Novaes (1895–1979), globally recognized Brazilian concert pianist
- Cristina Ortiz (born 1950), international concert pianist
- Sonia Rubinsky (born 1957), international concert pianist
- Antonietta Rudge (1885–1974), internationally recognized pianist and educator
- Anna Stella Schic (1922–2009), pianist, music writer and educator
- Clara Sverner (born 1936), classical concert pianist specializing in Brazilian music
- Magda Tagliaferro (1893–1986), international concert pianist and educator

== Bulgaria ==
- Dora Deliyska (born 1980), concert pianist based in Vienna
- Plamena Mangova (born 1980), concert pianist
- Panka Pelishek (1899–1990), pianist and music teacher
- Svetla Protich (born 1939), concert pianist and educator
- Emma Tahmizian (born 1957), pianist of Armenian descent
- Angela Tosheva (born 1961), pianist, chamber musician, educator, editor and publisher
- Julia Tsenova (1948–2010), award-winning composer, pianist and educator

== Canada ==
- Frances Adaskin (1900–2001), pianist who worked as an accompanist
- Ellen Ballon (1896–1969), child prodigy, pianist and educator
- Louise Bessette (born 1959), pianist specializing in contemporary music
- Jocelyne Binet (1923–1968), composer, pianist and music educator
- Patricia Blomfield Holt (1910–2003), composer, pianist and music educators
- Albertine Caron-Legris (1906–1972), pianist, composer and music educator
- Victoria Cartier (1867–1955), pianist, organist and music educator
- Eva Clare (1885–1961), pianist, music writer and educator
- Françoise de Clossey (born 1974), concert pianist and organist
- Jane Coop (born 1950), pianist and music pedagogue
- Marylou Dawes (1933–2013), concert pianist, accompanist, chamber musician and educator
- Isabelle Delorme (1900–1991), pianist, composer and music educator
- Lucille Dompierre (1899–1968), child prodigy, concert pianist and arranger
- Sophie Carmen Eckhardt-Gramatté (1899–1974), Russian-born Canadian composer, virtuoso pianist and violinist
- Anne Eggleston (1934–1994), pianist, composer and educator
- Gladys Ewart (1892–1957), concert pianist, accompanist and music educator
- Janina Fialkowska (born 1951), classical concert pianist and recording artist
- Janina Fialkowska (1899–1988), pianist, composer, publisher, music editor and educator
- Marian Grudeff (1927–2006), concert pianist, music educator and musical theatre composer
- Johana Harris (1912–1995), pianist, composer and music educator
- Angela Hewitt (born 1958), classical pianist specialising in Bach
- Alice Ho (born 1960), pianist and notable Canadian composer
- Anna Moncrieff Hovey (1902–1995), pianist, accompanist and music educator
- Yvonne Hubert (1895–1988), Belgian-born Canadian pianist and eminent educator
- Elaine Keillor (born 1939), musicologist, pianist and music writer specializing in Canadian composers
- Gwendolyn Koldofsky (1906–1998), piano accompanist and music educator
- Lubka Kolessa (1902–1997), Ukrainian-born Canadian classical pianist and educator
- Patricia Krueger (born 1946), classical pianist, organist and percussionist
- Gordana Lazarevich (born 1939), pianist, musicologist and educator
- Germaine Malépart (1898–1963), pianist and music educator
- Diana McIntosh (born 1937), composer and pianist
- Albertine Morin-Labrecque (1886–1957), pianist, soprano, composer and music educator
- Renée Morisset (1928–2009), pianist who played piano duos with her husband
- Dorothy Morton (1924–2008), pianist and music educator
- Marie-Thérèse Paquin (1905–1997), concert pianist and educator
- Christina Petrowska-Quilico (born 1948), classical concert pianist and recording artist
- Karen Quinton (fl. 1970s), pianist, organist, harpsichordist and music educator
- Dana Reason (fl. 1994), pianist, composer, recording artist and broadcaster
- Jacqueline Richard (1928–2015), pianist and conductor
- Anastasia Rizikov (born 1998), award-winning concert pianist
- Viviana Sofronitsky (fl. 1982), Russian-born Canadian pianist now based in the Czech Republic
- Alexandra Stréliski (born 1985), neo-classical composer and pianist
- Lorraine Vaillancourt (born 1947), pianist, conductor and educator
- Catherine Vickers (born 1952), pianist and educator now based in Germany
- Ruth Watson Henderson (born 1932), composer, pianist and accompanist

== Chile ==
- Delfina de la Cruz (1837–1905), pianist and First Lady of Chile
- Nina Frick Asenjo (1884–1963), pianist and composer
- Edith Fischer (born 1935), classical pianist; daughter of Elena Waiss
- Carmela Mackenna (1879–1862), pianist and composer.
- Rosita Renard (1894–1949), classical pianist
- Carla Sandoval (born 1982), pianist and chamber musician
- Mahani Teave (born 1983), classical pianist and educator from Easter Island
- Elena Waiss (1908–1988), pianist, music school founder

== China ==
- Jie Chen (born 1985), international concert pianist
- Sa Chen (born 1979), award-winning classical pianist
- Cheng Wai (fl. 2000s), Hong Kong award-winning pianist
- Guo Shan (born 1946), contemporary classical pianist
- Sunny Li (born 1991), concert pianist based in London
- Yuja Wang (born 1987), internationally recognized concert pianist
- Di Wu (fl. 1990s), Chinese-American classical pianist
- Wu Qian (born 1984), award-winning classical pianist
- Wu Yili (1931–2019), Chinese-Singaporean classical pianist
- Di Xiao (fl. 1996), international concert pianist now based in the UK
- Xie Jingxian (born 1983), award-winning Chinese concert pianist
- Zhang Dingyuan (born 1976), pianist and educator
- Mélodie Zhao (born 1994), pianist, composer and conductor
- Yin Zheng (fl. 2000s), concert pianist and educator
- Zhang Zuo (born 1988), award-winning classical pianist
- Zhu Xiao-Mei (born 1949), classical pianist and educator now based in Paris

== Colombia ==
- Josefina Acosta de Barón (born 1897), composer, pianist and educator
- Teresita Gómez (born 1943), influential pianist and educator

== Croatia ==
- Martina Filjak (born 1978), international concert pianist
- Eva Kirchmayer-Bilić (born 1971), pianist, chamber musician organist and educator
- Melita Lorković (1907–1987), international concert pianist and educator
- Ana-Marija Markovina (born 1970), classical pianist based in Cologne
- Branka Musulin (1917–1975), German-Croatian classical pianist and educator
- Ivana Švarc-Grenda (born 1970), classical pianist specializing in Chopin

== Cuba ==
- María de las Mercedes Adam de Aróstegui (1873–1957), Cuban pianist and composed based in Spain
- Cecilia Arizti (1856–1930), composer, pianist and educator
- Catalina Berroa (1849–1911), pianist, music teacher, composer
- Nohema Fernández (born 1944), pianist and educator who emigrated to the United States.
- Emma Martínez de la Torre Shelton (1889–1980), pianist and composer active in the Canary Islands
- Arminda Schutte (1909–1995), classical pianist and educator who settled in the United States

== Cyprus ==
- Rüya Taner (born 1971), Turkish Cypriot pianist now in Ankara

== Czech Republic ==
- Alice Herz-Sommer (1903–2014), Jewish pianist, music teacher and holocaust survivor
- Eliška Kleinová (1912–1999), Jewish pianist and music educator
- Ilona Štěpánová-Kurzová (1899–1975), concert pianist and educator
- Kristýna Znamenáčková (born 1988), classical pianist

== Denmark ==
- Agnes Adler (1865–1935), pianist and chamber musician
- Dagmar Borup (1867–1959), pianist and educator
- Katrine Gislinge (born 1969), pianist and chamber musician
- Margaret Hamerik (1867–1942), American-born Danish composer and pianist
- Elisabeth Klein (1911–2004), Hungarian-born Danish pianist who specialized in contemporary music
- Amalie Malling (born 1948), German-born Danish classical pianist and educator
- Anne Øland (1949–2015), concert pianist and educator
- Marianna Shirinyan (born 1978), Armenian-Danish pianist and chamber musician
- Johanne Stockmarr (1869–1944), virtuoso concert pianist
- Esther Vagning (1905–1986), concert pianist, accompanist, chamber musician and educator
- Catharine Wernicke (1789–1862), early female concert pianist
- Galina Werschenska (1906–1994), Russian-born Danish pianist, chamber musician and educator
- Elisabeth Westenholz (born 1942), pianist, organist and recording artist
- Assia Zlatkowa (born 1953), popular Bulgarian-Danish pianist who performed from age 8

== Dominican Republic ==
- Ninón Lapeiretta de Brouwer (1907–1989), composer and pianist

== Egypt ==
- Mona Ghoneim (born 1955), composer and pianist

== Estonia ==
Irina Zahharenkova (born 1976), pianist and harpsichordist

== Ethiopia ==
- Emahoy Tsegué-Maryam Guèbrou (1923-2023), composer, pianist and nun

== Finland ==
- Tuija Hakkila (born 1959), pianist and educator
- France Ellegaard (1913–1999), Danish-born Finnish pianist and educator considered one of the 20th century's great concert pianists

== France ==
- Irène Aïtoff (1904–2006), pianist, accompanist and voice educator
- Miirrha Alhambra (1890–1957), stage name of the pianist Pauline Joutard
- Annie d'Arco (1920–1998), classical pianist
- Yvonne Arnaud (1890–1958), pianist, singer and actress
- Racha Arodaky (fl. 2000s), Syrian-French concert pianist
- Delphine Bardin (born 1974), contemporary classical pianist
- Nathalie Béra-Tagrine (born 1960), classical pianist of Russian descent
- Marie Bigot (1786–1820), pianist, educator, composer
- Myriam Birger (born 1951), pianist who has performed from an early age
- Jeanne Blancard (1884–1972), composer and pianist
- Michèle Boegner (1941–2021), concert pianist
- Véronique Bonnecaze (born in 1963), concert pianist
- Marie-Léontine Bordes-Pène (1858–1924), pianist specializing in French composers
- Hélène Boschi (1917–1990), French-Swiss pianist and educator
- Magdeleine Boucherit Le Faure (1879–1960), pianist, composer and educator
- Brigitte Bouthinon-Dumas (born 1947), pianist, music educator and writer
- Emma Boynet (1891–1974), classical pianist
- Marie-Françoise Bucquet (1937–2018), pianist and educator
- Agnelle Bundervoët (1922–2015), pianist and composer, one of more notable French pianists of the 20th century
- Khatia Buniatishvili (born 1987), Georgian-born French concert pianist
- Célanie Carissan (1843–1927), composer and pianist.
- Paule Carrère-Dencausse (1891–1967), concert pianist and educator
- Gaby Casadesus (1901–1999), pianist and educator
- Cécile Chaminade (1857–1944), composer and pianist
- Claire Chevallier (born 1969), Franco-Belgian pianist specializing in the fortepiano
- Françoise Choveaux (born 1953), composer and pianist
- Wilhelmine Clauss-Szarvady (1832–1907), Bohemian-born French pianist
- France Clidat (1932–2012), classical pianist specializing in Liszt
- Catherine Collard (1947–1993), concert pianist and chamber musician
- Jeanne-Marie Darré (1905–1999), classical pianist specializing in Chopin and Liszt
- Célimène Daudet (born 1977), contemporary classical pianist and educator
- Florence Delaage (fl. 2000s), contemporary classical pianist
- Jeanne Demessieux (1921–1968), organist, pianist, composer and educator
- Lucette Descaves (1906–1993), pianist and educator
- Claire Désert (born 1967), pianist and educator
- Françoise Deslogères (born 1929), pianist and ondist
- Marie Dihau (1843–1935), singer, pianist and educator
- Geneviève Dinand (1927–1987), classical pianist
- Françoise Doreau (1910–2011), pianist and chamber musician
- Thérèse Dussaut (born 1939), pianist and music educator
- Stéphanie Elbaz (fl. 2010s), concert pianist
- Brigitte Engerer (1952–2012), pianist, educator and recording artist
- Jacqueline Eymar (1922–2008), pianist with an interest in contemporary composers
- Laure Favre-Kahn (born 1976), classical pianist
- Victoire Ferrari (1785–c.1823), pianist and voice educator
- Elena Filonova (fl. 2000s), contemporary pianist of Russian origin
- Marylin Frascone (born 1975), contemporary classical pianist
- Reine Gianoli (1915–1979), pianist and educator
- Marie-Catherine Girod (born 1949), pianist and educator
- Lélia Gousseau (1909–1997), classical pianist
- Yvonne Gouverné (1890–1982), pianist, accompanist and choir conductor
- Hélène Grimaud (born 1969), classical pianist and wildlife conservationist
- Youra Guller (1895–1980), classical pianist of Russian-Romanian heritage
- Annette Haas (1912–2002), concert pianist and educator
- Monique Haas (1909–1987), pianist specializing in French composers
- Guy d'Hardelot (1858–1936), pen name of the composer, pianist and educator Helen Rhodes
- Nicole Henriot-Schweitzer (1925–2001), pianist and educator
- Jeanne Herscher-Clément (1878–1941), pianist and composer
- Cécile Hugonnard-Roche (fl. 1970s), pianist and educator
- Marie Jaëll (1846–1925) pianist, composer and educator
- Catherine Joly (fl. 1970s), classical pianist
- Suzanne Joly (1914–2012), child prodigy, composer and pianist
- Geneviève Joy (1919–2009), classical and modernist pianist
- Marie-Josèphe Jude (born 1968), classical pianist
- Clotilde Kleeberg (1866–1909), classical pianist who performed throughout Europe
- Monique de La Bruchollerie (1915–1972), concert pianist
- Frédérique Lagarde (fl. 1980s), pianist performing in a saxophone-piano duo
- Françoise Landowski-Caillet (1917–2007), pianist and painter
- Claire-Marie Le Guay (born 1974), concert pianist and recording artist
- Yvonne Lefébure (1898–1986), pianist and educator
- Marguerite Long (1874–1966), pianist and educator
- Yvonne Loriod (1924–2010), pianist, educator and composer
- Anne Lovett (fl. 2000s), pianist and recording artist based in London
- Gisèle Magnan (fl. 1980s), classical pianist
- Lily Maisky (born 1987), classical pianist
- Xénia Maliarevitch (born 1980), contemporary French pianist
- Madeleine Malraux (1914–2014), concert pianist
- Marquesa del Ter (1864–1936), pianist, feminist and linguist
- Ginette Martenot (1902–1996), pianist and ondes Martenot player
- Berthe Marx (1859–1925), concert pianist remembered for memorizing some 250 works
- Marcelle Meyer (1897–1958), pianist performing with Les Six
- Nathalia Milstein (born 1995), award-winning classical pianist
- Caroline Montigny-Rémaury (1843–1913), virtuoso pianist
- Germaine Mounier (1920–2006), classical pianist and music educator
- Isabelle Oehmichen (born 1961), pianist and educator
- Micheline Ostermeyer (1922–2001), athlete and concert pianist
- Cécile Ousset (born 1936), global concert performer and educator
- Simone Plé-Caussade (1987–1986), music educator, composer and pianist
- Henriette Puig-Roget (1910–1992), pianist, organist and music educator
- Anne Queffélec (born 1948), concert pianist and chamber musician
- Anne Rey (1944–2012), musicologist, pianist, journalist and educator
- Éliane Richepin (1910–1999), pianist and educator
- Jacqueline Robin (1917–2007), pianist and accompanist
- Marie-Aimée Roger-Miclos (1860–1951), widely performed concert pianist and educator
- Véronique Roux (born 1955), pianist and chamber musician
- Caroline Sageman (born 1973), pianist specializing in Chopin and Liszt and educator
- Lise de la Salle (born 1988), classical pianist
- Amandine Savary (born 1984), concert pianist, chamber musician and educator
- Blanche Selva (1884–1942), pianist, educator, writer and composer
- Lydie Solomon (born 1982), pianist and actress
- Elizabeth Sombart (born 1958), pianist and educator
- Valérie Soudères (1914–1995), pianist, composer and educator
- Emmanuelle Swiercz (born 1978), classical pianist
- Nadia Tagrine (1917–2003), pianist and music broadcaster
- Sophie Teboul (born 1976), pianist and educator
- Françoise Thinat (born 1934), pianist and educator
- Hélène Tysman (born 1982), classical pianist
- Germaine Thyssens-Valentin (1902–1987), classical pianist specializing in French music
- Andrée Vaurabourg (1894–1980), pianist and educator
- Justine Verdier (born 1985), classical pianist
- Marie Vermeulin (born 1983), pianist and chamber musician
- Vanessa Wagner (born 1973), classical pianist

== Georgia ==
- Eteri Andjaparidze (born 1956), pianist and educator now based in USA
- Elisso Bolkvadze (born 1967), award-winning classical pianist
- Khatia Buniatishvili (born 1987), French-Georgian concert pianist
- Manana Doijashvili (fl. 1970s), pianist and educator
- Marina Goglidze-Mdivani (born 1936), Georgian concert pianist now based in Canada
- Inga Kashakashvili (fl. 1991), classical concert pianist
- Aliza Kezeradze (1937–1996), pianist and educator
- Elisabeth Leonskaja (born 1945), Soviet-Georgian pianist now based in Vienna
- Marina Nadiradze (born 1978), concert pianist now based in Scotland
- Irma Svanadze (fl. 2000s), classical pianist now based in the United States
- Tamriko Siprashvili (born 1963), pianist and educator
- Anastasia Virsaladze (1883–1968), concert pianist and educator
- Eliso Virsaladze (born 1942), Georgian concert pianist and educator
- Elena Dzamashvili (1942–2020), pianist and educator

== Germany ==
- Valentina Babor (born 1989), classical concert pianist from an early age
- Maria Baptist (born 1971), pianist, composer and educator
- Elisabeth Brauß (born 1995), concert pianist
- Siglind Bruhn (born 1951), musicologist and concert pianist
- Rose Cannabich (1764–1839), pianist taught by Mozart
- Milana Chernyavska (born 1974), Ukraine-born German classical pianist and chamber musician with a focus on contemporary music
- Kimiko Douglass-Ishizaka (born 1976), German-Japanese composer, pianist and former olympic weightlifter
- Sandra Droucker (1875–1944), Russian-born concert pianist who settled and taught in Germany before moving to Oslo
- Konstanze Eickhorst (born 1961), pianist, chamber musician and educator
- Clara Mathilda Faisst (1872–1948), pianist, composer and writer
- Caroline Fischer (fl. 2000s), German-Korean concert pianist and educator
- Henriette Gaertner (born 1975), classical concert pianist
- Umi Garrett (born 2003), classical pianist who started when very young
- Gertraud Geißler (fl. 1970s), pianist and educator
- Christine Genast (1798–1860), actress, singer and pianist.<refFürstenau, Moritz (1878). Allgemeine Deutsche Biographie 8 (in German). pp. 560–562. Archived from the original on 2025-02-20.</ref>
- Carmen Geutjes (born 2003), concert pianist performing from an early age
- Anna Gourari (fl. 1979), Russian-German pianist and recording artist
- Erika Haase (1935–2013), classical pianist and educator
- Barbara Heller (born 1936), composer and pianist
- Else Herold (1906–1909), pianist, recording artist and educator
- Elisabeth von Herzogenberg (1847–1892), pianist, composer, singer and philanthropist
- Margarita Höhenrieder (born 1956), classical pianist and chamber musician
- Therese Jansen Bartolozzi (1770–1843), German-born pianist who settled in London
- Louise Japha (1826–1910), pianist and composer
- Ewa Kupiec (born 1964), Polish-born German pianist and educator
- Elena Kuschnerova (born 1959), Russian-German classical concert pianist and educator
- Sophie Lebrun (1781–1863), pianist, recording artist and composer
- Adele Lewing (1866–1943), pianist and composer
- Helene Liebmann (1795–1869), pianist and composer
- Sabine Liebner (fl. 2000s), contemporary classical pianist
- Draga Matković (1907–2013), Croatian-German pianist, conductor and composer who performed when over 100
- Fanny Mendelssohn (1805–1847), composer and pianist
- Sophie Menter (1846–1918), pianist and composer, student of Liszt
- Kristin Merscher (born 1961), classical pianist and educator
- Florence Millet (born 1964), French-German classical pianist and educator
- Elly Ney (1882–1968), virtuoso pianist, chamber musician specializing in Beethoven
- Adele aus der Ohe (1861–1937), concert pianist and composer
- Caroline Oltmanns (born 1962), concert pianist and educator
- Mona Asuka Ott (born 1991), concert pianist who performed from an early age
- Agnes Elisabeth Overbeck (1870–1919), composer and pianist
- Anna Caroline Oury (1808–1880), pianist and composer who settled in England
- Sophie Pacini (born 1991), German-Italian pianist who performed from an early age
- Edith Picht-Axenfeld (1914–2001), concert pianist and harpsichordist
- Aleksandra Romanić (born 1958), Yugoslavian-German concert pianist
- Alexandra Röseler (fl. 1988), pianist and mezzo-soprano
- Olga Scheps (born 1986), Russian-German concert pianist and chamber musician
- Ragna Schirmer (born 1972), classical pianist
- Annerose Schmidt (born 1936), concert pianist and educator
- Clara Schumann (1819–1896), distinguished pianist, composer and educator
- Katharina Sellheim (born 1976), pianist, chamber musician and lied accompanist
- Clara Isabella Siegle (born 2000), pianist who performed from an early age
- Katharina Treutler (fl. 2000s), concert pianist and educator
- Käte van Tricht (1909–1996), organist, pianist, harpsichordist and educator
- Dina Ugorskaja (1973–2019), Russian-born German pianist and educator
- Walburga Willmann (1769–1835), concert pianist and composer
- Therese von Zandt (1771–1858), pianist and singer
- Agnes Zimmermann (1847–1925), German concert pianist and composer who lived in England

== Greece ==
- Gina Bachauer (1913–1976), classical pianist, educator, and early recording artist
- Rita Bouboulidi (20th century), concert pianist and recording artist
- Danae Kara (born 1953), classical concert pianist, recording artist and educator
- Rena Kyriakou (1917–1994), pianist and composer
- Lila Lalauni (1918–1996), pianist and composer.
- Nefeli Mousoura (fl. 2000s), classical pianist
- Clio-Danae Othoneou (born 1979), actress, musician and pianist

== Haiti ==
- Carmen Brouard (1909–2005), pianist, composer and music educator

== Hong Kong ==
- Rachel Cheung (born 1991), award-winning classical pianist
- Colleen Lee (born 1980), international concert pianist
- Eleanor Wong (fl. 1990s), pianist, educator and contest juror

== Hungary ==
- Sari Biro (1912–1990), concert pianist and educator who settled in the United States
- Ilona Eibenschütz (1873–1967), pianist, a close friend of Brahms
- Edith Farnadi (1921–1973), pianist, partner of violinist Jenő Hubay
- Annie Fischer (1914–1995), classical pianist and recording artist
- Etelka Freund (1879–1977), international concert pianist
- Gisella Grosz (1875–1942), classical pianist and educator
- Márta Gulyás (born 1953), pianist, chamber musician and educator
- Ilona Kabos (1893–1973), Hungarian-British pianist and educator
- Zhivka Klinkova (1924–2002), composer, pianist and conductor.
- Lili Kraus (1903–1986), Hungarian-born pianist who settled in New Zealand
- Adrienne Krausz (born 1967), classical pianist
- Márta Kurtág (1927–2019), classical pianist and educator
- Clara Lichtenstein (1860–1946), pianist and educator
- Lívia Rév (1916–2018), classical concert pianist
- Irén Marik (1905–1986), Hungarian-born pianist who settled in the United States
- Zsuzsanna Sirokay (born 1941), classical pianist now based in Switzerland
- Valéria Szervánszky (born 1947), Hungarian classical pianist now based in the United Kingdom
- Zdenka Ticharich (1900–1979), pianist, music educator and composer
- Judit Varga (born 1979), composer, pianist and educator
- Stephanie Wurmbrand-Stuppach (1849–1919), pianist and composer

== Indonesia ==
- Ayke Agus (born 1949), international classical violinist, pianist and educator
- Victoria Audrey Sarasvathi (born 1997), concert pianist
- Kuei Pin Yeo (fl. 1980s), classical pianist and educator

== Ireland ==
- Rhoda Coghill (1903–2000), pianist, composer and poet
- Joan Trimble (1915–2000), composer and pianist
- Bettina Walker (1837–1893), pianist and composer, remembered for her memoirs

== Israel ==
- Astrith Baltsan (born 1956), concert pianist and musicologist specializing in Beethoven
- Berenika Glixman (born 1984), classical pianist'
- Dorel Golan (fl. 2000s), classical pianist
- Aviya Kopelman (born 1978), composer and pianist
- Sally Pinkas (fl. 1983), Israeli-born American pianist specializing in contemporary music
- Pnina Salzman (1922–2006), classical pianist and educator
- Shira Shaked (born 1981), concert pianist now based in New York
- Verdina Shlonsky (1905–1990), early Israeli composer and pianist
- Bella Shteinbuk (born 1960), pianist and educator
- Ilana Vered (born 1943), concert pianist and educator
- Miri Yampolsky (born 1971), Russian-Israeli pianist

== Italy ==
- Laura Alvini (1946–2005), pianist and harpsichordist
- Alessandra Ammara (born 1972), classical pianist
- Elena Ciamarra Cammarano (1894–1981), pianist and painter
- Lucia Contini Anselmi (1876–1913), pianist and composer
- Cristina Ariagno (born 1962), classical pianist
- Leonora Armellini (born 1992), classical pianist
- Chiara Bertoglio (born 1983), pianist, writer and theologian
- Donatella Bianconi (1929-2017), pianist and singer
- Renata Borgatti (1894-1964), classical pianist
- Gilda Buttà (born 1959), concert pianist
- Gloria Campaner (born 1986), concert pianist
- Marisa Candeloro (1926–2003), classical concert pianist
- Cristina Canziani (born 1972), pianist and artistic director
- Maria Carreras (1877–1966), classical concert pianist
- Enrica Cavallo (1921–2007), classical concert pianist
- Virginia Mariani Campolieti (1869–1941), pianist, conductor, composer
- Enrica Ciccarelli (born 1965), classical pianist
- Elisa Ciccodicola (1854–1950), classical pianist
- Lethea Cifarelli (1917–2003), classical pianist and educator
- Anna Maria Cigoli (born 1952), classical pianist
- Graziella Concas (born 1970), pianist and composer
- Marcella Crudeli (born 1940), classical pianist
- Maria Curcio (1918–2009), classical pianist and educator
- Lya De Barberiis (1919–2013), pianist and educator
- Laura De Fusco (born 1948), classical concert pianist
- Elvira de Gresti (1846–1937), pianist, composer and writer
- Rina De Liguoro (1892–1966), pianist and actress
- Martha Del Vecchio (1906–1991), classical pianist
- Emilia Fadini (1930–2021), pianist, harpsichordist and musicologist
- Ines Maria Ferraris (1882–1971), pianist and soprano
- Vera Franceschi (1877–1966), classical concert pianist
- Ada Gentile (born 1947), pianist and composer
- Maria Giacchino Cusenza (1898–1979), pianist and composer
- Vera Gobbi Belcredi (1903–1999), classical pianist
- Giulietta Gordigiani (1871–1957), pianist and singer
- Emilia Gubitosi (1887–1972), pianist and composer
- Gemma Luziani (1867–1894), classical pianist
- Maria Perrotta (born 1974), concert pianist and recording artist
- Cecilia Pillado (born 1966), pianist, composer and actress
- Maria Luigia Pizzoli (1817–1838), pianist and composer
- Teresa Procaccini (born 1934), pianist and composer
- Lidia Proietti (1921–2014), classical pianist
- Teresa Rampazzi (1914–2001), pianist with an interest in avant-garde music
- Beatrice Rana (born 1993), concert pianist and recording artist
- Madame Ravissa (died 1807), singer and composer of harpsichord sonatas
- Liliana Renzi (1928–2012), classical pianist
- Elsa Respighi (1894–1996), pianist, composer, writer
- Veronica Rudian (born 1990), concert pianist, composer
- Gilda Ruta (1853–1932), pianist, music educator and composer
- Antonia Sarcina (born 1963), pianist, composer and conductor
- Marina Scalafiotti (born 1965), concert pianist and educator
- Giovanna Sorbi (1959–2018), pianist, conductor, composer
- Annarosa Taddei (1918–2011), pianist and educator
- Maria Tipo (1931–2025), concert pianist, recording artist and educator
- Margherita Torretta (born 1985), concert pianist
- Maria Elisa Tozzi (born 1929), concert pianist
- Mariangela Vacatello (born 1982), international concert pianist
- Irene Veneziano (born 1985), classical concert pianist
- Renata Zatti Cicuttini (1932–2003), pianist, composer, cellist

== Japan ==
- Akiko Ebi (born 1953), Japanese-French international concert pianist
- Etsuko Hirose (born 1979), classical concert pianist
- Satoko Inoue (born 1958), concert pianist
- Kei Itoh (fl. 1977), concert pianist
- Mayumi Kameda (born 1957), concert pianist
- Yoko Kanno (born 1963), composer, arranger, participating in anime films and soundtracks
- Yuko Kawai (fl. 1990s), concert pianist specializing in Chopin
- Mine Kawakami (born 1969), pianist and composer
- Ruriko Kikuchi (fl. 1970s), pianist and educator
- Aimi Kobayashi (born 1995), classical pianist
- Nobu Kōda (1870–1946), composer, violinist, pianist and educator
- Mari Kodama (born 1967), classical concert pianist and recording artist
- Momo Kodama (born 1972), classical concert pianist specializing in French and Japanese modern compositions
- Yu Kosuge (born 1983), concert pianist who played from an early age
- Mayako Kubo (born 1947), pianist and composer now in Berlin
- Mari Kumamoto (born 1964), pianist and educator known for her recordings of Spanish and Japanese composers
- Eriko Makimura, concert pianist, performance artist, and educator
- Nagino Maruyama (born 1999), classical pianist
- Yuki Matsuzawa (born 1960), pianist specializing in Chopin
- Yoko Misumi (fl. 2000s), concert pianist and chamber musician
- Haruna Miyake (born 1942), pianist and composer
- Miku Nishimoto-Neubert (fl. 1990s), pianist and educator
- Noriko Ogawa (born 1962), Japanese pianist based in London
- Saori Sarina Ohno (born 1970), pianist and chamber musician
- Alice Sara Ott (born 1988), German-born Japanese classical pianist
- Hiroko Sasaki (fl. 2000s), pianist, chamber musician and educator
- Atsuko Seki (born 1964), classical pianist
- Atsuko Seta (born 1955), concert pianist and educator
- Fumiko Shiraga (1967–2017), German-Japanese classical pianist
- Yukiko Sugawara (fl. 1990s), pianist and chamber musician
- Aki Takahashi (born 1944), pianist specializing in contemporary classical music
- Marika Takeuchi (born 1987), contemporary composer, music producer and pianist
- Mitsuko Uchida (born 1948), Japanese-British classical pianist and conductor
- Ayako Uehara (born 1980), classical pianist
- Yumiko Urabe (born 1959), classical pianist and educator
- Misato Yokoyama (born 1973), classical concert pianist

== Kazakhstan ==
- Jania Aubakirova (born 1957), classical pianist

== Latvia ==
- Lūcija Garūta (1902–1977), pianist, poet and composer
- Olga Jegunova (born 1984), classical pianist now based in London
- Shoshana Rudiakov (1948–2012), pianist and music educator

== Lebanon ==
- Pianist Nada, classical pianist now based in USA

== Lithuania ==
- Sulamita Aronovsky (1929–2022), classical pianist and educator now based in London
- Adelė Daunoravičiūtė (born 1991), award-winning classical pianist
- Nadezhda Dukstulskaite (1912–1978), pianist who promoted interest in Lithuanian composers
- Evelina Puzaitė (born 1982), pianist, composer and writer
- Mūza Rubackytė (born 1959), pianist and educator now based in Paris
- Raminta Šerkšnytė (born 1975), composer and pianist
- Aleksandra Žvirblytė (born 1971), pianist and educator

== Luxembourg ==
- Cathy Krier (born 1985), international concert pianist
- Albena Petrovic-Vratchanska (born 1965), Bulgarian-born composer, pianist and educator who has settled in Luxembourg
- Tatsiana Zelianko, Belarus-born composer and pianist.

== Mexico ==
- Graciela Agudelo (1945–2018), pianist and composer
- Sofía Cancino de Cuevas (1897–1982), composer, pianist, singer and conductor
- Alba Herrera y Ogazón (1885–1931), pianist, writer, educator and musicologist
- Maria Teresa Naranjo Ochoa (1934–2007), virtuoso pianist and educator
- Margot Rojas Mendoza (1903–1996), concert pianist and educator
- Alicia Urreta (1930–1986), pianist, music educator and composer
- Consuelo Villalon Aleman (1907–1998), pianist and educator specializing in Chopin
- Betty Zanolli Fabila (born 1965), pianist and music educator
- Eva Maria Zuk (1945–2017), Polish-Mexican concert pianist

== Netherlands ==
- Dina Appeldoorn (1884–1938), composer, pianist and accompanist
- Helena Basilova (born 1983), Russian-born classical pianist and educator based in the Netherlands
- Gertrude van den Bergh (1793–1840), pianist and composer
- Sarah Bosmans-Benedicts (1861–1949), pianist and educator
- Elizabeth Joanetta Catherine von Hagen (1750–1809), pianist, educator and composer living in the United States
- Frida Kindler (1879–1964), Dutch pianist active in the UK, wife of Bernard van Dieren
- Kristina Sandulova (born 1978), Bulgarian-Dutch classical pianist
- Rosy Wertheim (1888–1949), pianist, music educator and composer

== New Zealand ==
- Dorothy Davies (1899–1987), pianist and piano teacher
- Joan Havill (fl. 2000s), pianist and educator based in London
- Jennie Macandrew (1866–1949), pianist, organist, music educator and conductor
- Janetta McStay (1917–2012), pianist, chamber musician and educator
- Vera Moore (1896–1997), concert pianist who enjoyed a successful career both in England and New Zealand
- Doris Gertrude Sheppard (1902–1982), British-born New Zealand pianist, singer, composer and educator

== Norway ==
- Amalie Christie (1913–2010), classical pianist and music writer
- Agathe Backer Grøndahl (1847–1907), pianist and composer
- Theodora Cormontan (1840–1922), pianist, music publisher and composer who made a name in Norway before emigrating to the United States
- Mary Barratt Due (1888–1969), influential Norwegian pianist and educator
- Fredrikke Egeberg (1815–1861), pianist and composer.
- Maja Flagstad (1871–1958), pianist, choral conductor and accompanist
- Jacobine Gjertz (1819–1862), pianist, composer and writer.
- Kari Aarvold Glaser (1901–1972), pianist and educator
- Liv Glaser (born 1935), pianist and educator
- Borghild Holmsen (1865–1938), pianist, teacher, music critic and composer.
- Eva Knardahl (1927–2006), child prodigy and concert pianist who emigrated to the United States
- Ruth Lagesen (1914–2005), pianist and conductor
- Erika Nissen (1845–1903), concert pianist and music educator
- Ingfrid Breie Nyhus (born 1978), classical pianist
- Anne-Marie Ørbeck (1911–1996), pianist and composer
- Anne Eline Riisnæs (born 1951), pianist and educator
- Eline Nygaard Riisnæs (1913–2011), pianist and musicologist
- Natalia Strelchenko (1976–2015), world-renowned concert pianist of Russian origin
- Gunilla Süssmann (born 1977), classical pianist
- Hanna-Marie Weydahl (1922–2016), concert pianist and educator

== Peru ==
- Myriam Avalos (fl. 2000s), classical pianist from an early age

== Philippines ==
- Cecile Licad (fl. 1980s), concert pianist and recording artist
- Rowena Sánchez Arrieta (born 1962), concert pianist
- Ingrid Sala Santamaria (born 1940), concert pianist

== Poland ==
- Nelly Ben-Or (born 1933), pianist and educator now based in England
- Felicja Blumental (1908–1991), pianist and recording artist specializing in Beethoven and Chopin
- Marcelina Czartoryska (1817–1894), pianist, student of Chopin
- Joanna Domańska (born 1959), pianist and music educator
- Halina Czerny-Stefańska (1922–2001), pianist and contest juror
- Władysława Markiewiczówna (1900–1982), pianist and renowned educator
- Róża Etkin-Moszkowska (1908–1945), pianist specializing in Chopin
- Lidia Grychtołówna (born 1928), international concert pianist
- Barbara Hesse-Bukowska (1930–2013), concert pianist
- Katarzyna Jaczynowska (1872–1920), pianist and educator
- Maryla Jonas (1911–1959), Polish pianist who moved to Brazil and later to the United States
- Natalia Karp (1911–2007), concert pianist and Holocaust survivor
- Gabriela Moyseowicz (born 1944), composer and pianist
- Katarzyna Popowa-Zydroń (born 1948), pianist, educator and contest juror of Bulgarian descent
- Monika Rosca (born 1961), former child actress, now a pianist
- Regina Smendzianka (1924–2011), pianist who performed from the age of eight
- Marta Sosińska (born 1939), classical pianist and educator now based in Germany
- Jadwiga Szajna-Lewandowska (1912–1994), pianist, music educator and composer
- Paula Szalit (c.1887–1920), pianist and composer
- Jadwiga Szamotulska (1911–1981), pianist, music and voice educator and recording artist
- Antoinette Szumowska (1868–1938), concert pianist and music educator
- Maria Szymanowska (1789–1831), composer and early virtuoso pianist
- Izabella Zielińska (1910–2017), concert pianist and educator

== Portugal ==
- Maria João Pires (born 1944), pianist and educator
- Helena Sá e Costa (1913–2006), concert pianist and educator

== Romania ==
- Elena Asachi (1789–1877), pianist, singer and composer
- Esmeralda Athanasiu-Gardeev (1834–1917), pianist and composer
- Elena Bibescu (1855–1902), noblewoman considered to be one of the greatest 19th-century pianists
- Manya Botez (1896–1971), pianist and children's music teacher
- Dana Ciocarlie (born 1968), pianist and educator now based in France
- Alexandra Dariescu (born 1985), concert pianist from an early age
- Cella Delavrancea (1887–1991), pianist, writer and piano teacher
- Violeta Dinescu (born 1953), composer, pianist and educator based in Germany
- Carola Grindea (1914–2009), Romanian-born British pianist and educator
- Clara Haskil (1895–1960), classical pianist
- Diana Ionescu (born 1981), international concert pianist
- Myriam Marbe (1931–1997), composer and pianist
- Florica Musicescu (1887–1969), renowned pianist and music educator
- Rodica Sutzu (1913–1979), classical pianist and music educator
- Liana Șerbescu (born 1934), pianist, educator and musicologist
- Silvia Șerbescu (1903–1965), concert pianist and educator
- Alexandra Silocea (born 1984), concert pianist based in Vienna
- Mihaela Ursuleasa (1978–2012), concert pianist and recording artist

== Russia ==
- Ella Adayevskaya (1846–1926), composer, pianist and ethnomusicologist
- Nelly Akopian-Tamarina (born 1941), classical concert pianist who performed from an early age
- Natalya Antonova (born 1974), classical pianist and educator
- Yulianna Avdeeva (born 1985), concert pianist
- Helena Basilova (born 1983), classical pianist based in the Netherlands
- Elena Beckman-Shcherbina (1882–1951), pianist, composer and educator
- Maria Belooussova (died 2018), chamber music specialist based in Paris
- Ludmila Berlinskaya (born 1960), pianist and actress
- Violetta Egorova (born 1969), international concert pianist
- Violetta Egorova (born 1936), pianist and educator
- Irina Emeliantseva (born 1973), composer, chamber musician and pianist
- Victoria Foust (born 1975), classical pianist and composer
- Margarita Fyodorova (1927–2016), Soviet Russian pianist
- Eugenia Gabrieluk (born 1967), international concert pianist
- Varvara Gaigerova (1903–1944), composer and pianist
- Elena Gilels (1948–1996), pianist remembered for Mozart's piano concertos
- Vera Gornostayeva (1929–2015), pianist and educator
- Maria Grinberg (1908–1978), Soviet pianist and educator
- Anastasia Gromoglasova (born 1984), classical pianist and duo piano performer
- Sofya Gulyak (born 1979), classical pianist
- Tamara Guseva (born 1926), Soviet Russian classical pianist
- Zinaida Ignatyeva (born 1938), pianist and educator
- Valentina Igoshina (born 1978), award-winning classical pianist
- Leokadiya Kashperova (1872–1940), pianist, Romantic composer and educator
- Elizaveta Klyuchereva (born 1999), award-winning pianist who has performed from an early age
- Olga Kozlova (born 1986), classical pianist
- Polina Leschenko (fl. 2000s), concert pianist who performed from an early age
- Maria Levinskaya (1885–1960), Russian pianist and teacher active in the UK
- Tatiana Nikolayeva (1924–1993), Soviet-Russian pianist, composer and educator
- Dina Parakhina (fl. 1980s), Russian-born concert pianist and educator now based in the United Kingdom
- Olga Pashchenko (born 1986), international harpsichordist, fortepianist, organist and pianist
- Irina Plotnikova (born 1954), concert pianist and educator
- Viktoria Postnikova (born 1944), international concert pianist and chamber musician
- Nadezhda Rimskaya-Korsakova (1848–1919), pianist and composer who influenced her husband Rimsky-Korsakov
- Elena Rostropovich (born 1958), concert pianist and philanthropist working for the well-being of children
- Kira Shashkina (20th century), pianist and renowned educator
- Tatiana Shebanova (1953–2011), international concert pianist and recording artist who settled in Poland
- Katia Skanavi (born 1971), Russian concert pianist of Greek descent
- Svetlana Smolina (fl. 2000s), Russian-born pianist active in the United States
- Natalia Sokolovskaya (born 1989), international concert pianist and composer
- Anna t'Haron (born 1978), pianist and chamber musician
- Rosa Tamarkina (1920–1950), Kiev-born Soviet concert pianist, educator and recording artist
- Vera Timanova (1855–1942), child prodigy, concert pianist and educator
- Anna Tsybuleva (born 1990), classical pianist
- Anna Vinnitskaya (born 1983), classical concert pianist
- Evelina Vorontsova (born 1972), concert pianist and educator
- Marina Yakhlakova (born 1991), pianist who has performed from an early age and continues to receive acclaim
- Anna Yesipova (1851–1914), prominent pianist admired in the United States
- Maria Yudina (1899–1970), Soviet virtuoso pianist
- Lilya Zilberstein (born 1965), pianist and recording artist

== Serbia ==
- Slavka Atanasijević (1850–1897), pianist and composer
- Lidija Bizjak (born 1976), concert pianist
- Sanja Bizjak (born 1988), concert pianist
- Zorica Dimitrijević-Stošić (1934–2013), pianist, accompanist and educator
- Olivera Đurđević (1928–2006), pianist, harpsichordist and educator
- Marija Gluvakov (born 1973), pianist and educator
- Rita Kinka (born 1962), classical pianist of Hungarian descent
- Olga Mihajlović (fl. 1939–1978), classical pianist and educator
- Jasna Popovic (fl. 1997), classical concert pianist
- Aleksandra Trajković (born 1975), classical pianist and educator, widely broadcast on Yugoslav TV and radio
- Nataša Veljković (born 1968), classical pianist now based in Vienna
- Vera Veljkov-Medaković (1923–2011), concert pianist and educator
- Ljiljana Vukajlović (fl. 1966), pianist, accompanist and chamber musician

== Singapore ==
- Abigail Sin (born 1992), award-winning classical pianist
- Margaret Leng Tan (born 1945), classical musician known for her work as a professional toy pianist

== Slovakia ==
- Sylvia Čápová-Vizváry (born 1947), concert pianist
- Viera Janárceková (born 1941), pianist, composer and educator now based in Germany
- Monika Mockovčáková (born 1971), classical concert pianist

== Slovenia ==
- Damjana Bratuž (1927–2025), pianist, musicologist and music pedagogue
- Friderika Podgornik (1880–1948), pianist and music educator
- Nina Prešiček (born 1976), concert pianist

== South Africa ==
- Elsie Hall (1877–1976), prominent Australian-born South African classical pianist

== South Korea ==
- Yoonjung Han (born 1985), Korean-American pianist and educator
- Heejae Kim (born c.1987), classical pianist
- Jiyeong Mun (born 1995), pianist and chamber musician
- Yeol Eum Son (born 1986), concert pianist and educator
- Haewon Song (fl. 1980s), concert pianist now based in the United States
- Hai-Kyung Suh (born 1960), South Korean pianist based in New York
- Joyce Yang (born 1986), concert pianist now based in the United States
- Jeanne You (born 1978), concert pianist and educator now based in Germany

== Spain ==
- Rosa García Ascot (1902–2002), composer and pianist specializing in de Falla
- Amparo Iturbi (1898–1969), pianist who played in MGM musicals
- Alicia de Larrocha (1923–2009), legendary pianist and composer
- Teresa Llacuna (born 1935), Catalan classical pianist
- Leonora Milà Romeu (born 1942), Catalan pianist and composer
- Paloma O'Shea (born 1936), pianist and arts patron
- Rosa Sabater (1929-1983), classical pianist
- Marianna Prjevalskaya (born 1982), Russian-born Spanish pianist who performs internationally

== Sri Lanka ==
- Shani Diluka (born 1976), Monaco-born Sri Lankan pianist
- Tanya Ekanayaka (born 1977), concert pianist and composer

== Sweden ==
- Valborg Aulin (1860–1928), pianist and composer
- Ebba d'Aubert (1819–1860), concert pianist
- Monica Dominique (born 1940), pianist, composer and actress
- Marianne Ehrenström (1773–1867), writer, singer, painter and pianist
- Aurore von Haxthausen (1830–1888), writer, composer and pianist
- Ingrid Fuzjko Hemming (born 1932), classical concert pianist
- Wilhelmina Josephson (1816–1906), notable pianist and educator
- Maria Lettberg (born 1970), pianist now living in Berlin
- Sara Augusta Malmborg (1810–1860), singer, pianist and painter
- Natalya Pasichnyk (born 1971), Swedish-Ukrainian classical pianist
- Ika Peyron (1845–1922), composer, pianist and organist
- Amanda Sandborg Waesterberg (1842–1918), composer, cantor and pianist
- Ingeborg Bronsart von Schellendorf (1840–1913), Swedish-German composer and concert pianist
- Julia Sigova (born 1982), concert pianist
- Fanny Stål (1821–1889), classical concert pianist
- Bertha Tammelin (1836–1915), actress, mezzo-soprano, pianist, composer and drama teacher
- Emilia Uggla (1819–1855), classical concert pianist and concert singer

== Switzerland ==
- Caroline Boissier-Butini (1786–1836), pianist and composer
- Hélène Boschi (1917–1990), Franco-Swiss pianist and educator
- Sylviane Deferne (born 1965), concert pianist
- Lisy Fischer (1900–1999), concert pianist and educator
- Fanny Hünerwadel (1826–1854), pianist, singer and composer
- Margaret Kitchin (1914–2008), classical pianist associated with contemporary music
- Marguerite Roesgen-Champion (1895–1976), composer, pianist and harpsichordist
- Marianne Schroeder (born 1949), pianist and composer

== Taiwan ==
- Fenia Chang (fl. 2000s), concert pianist and educator
- Christiana Lin (fl. 1990s), Chinese-Austrian pianist and harpsichordist
- Chen Pi-hsien (born 1950), Taiwanese-German classical pianist and educator
- Ching-yun Hu (fl. 2000s), award-winning classical pianist
- Chia-Hui Lu (born 1976), classical concert pianist
- Szuyu Rachel Su (born 1998), award-winning concert pianist

== Turkey ==
- Anjelika Akbar (born 1969), composer, pianist and writer
- İdil Biret (born 1941), known for her romantic repertoire
- Verda Erman (1944–2014), concert pianist
- Lara Melda (born 1993), British-Turkish concert pianist
- Ayşegül Sarıca (1935–2023), concert pianist and educator
- Zeynep Üçbaşaran (fl. 2000s), award-winning pianist

== Ukraine ==
- Anna Fedorova (born 1990), concert pianist
- Génia (fl. 1999), London-based Ukrainian-born virtuoso pianist and composer
- Anna Kravtchenko (born 1976), pianist and educator now based in Switzerland
- Valentina Lisitsa (born 1973), Ukrainian-born American pianist
- Irina Zaritskaya (1939–2001), pianist who later settled in London

== United Kingdom ==
- Imogen Cooper (born 1949), concert pianist and chamber musician
- Jill Crossland (fl. 2000s), English classical pianist
- Eiluned Davies (1913-1999), Anglo Welsh concert pianist and composer
- Fanny Davies (1861–1934), Guernsey-born British classical pianist
- Adelina de Lara (1872–1925), classical pianist and composer
- Alice Diehl (1844–1912), concert pianist who became a novelist
- Sophia Dussek (1775–1831), Scottish singer, pianist, harpist and composer
- Lilian Elkington (1900–1969), English pianist and composer
- Margaret Fairchild (1911–1989), concert pianist, nun and homeless woman
- Margaret Fingerhut (born 1955), classical pianist and educator
- Alissa Firsova (born 1986), Russian-born British classical composer, pianist and conductor
- Norma Fisher (born 1940), concert pianist and educator
- Kyla Greenbaum (1922–2017), British pianist who specialised in contemporary music
- Margaret Kitchin (1914–2008), Swiss-born British pianist who specialised in contemporary music
- Harriet Hague (1793–1816), pianist and composer
- Myra Hess (1890–1965), classical pianist who maintained morale by playing during World War II
- Dorothy Howell (1898–1982), composer and pianist
- Edna Iles (1905–2003), English classical pianist who broadcast frequently
- Elizabeth Jonas (c.1825–1877), child prodigy, concert pianist and educator
- Anna Robena Laidlaw (1819–1901), court pianist to the Queen of Hanover
- Mabel Lander (1882–1955), British pianist and teacher, piano tutor to the Royal Family
- Ethel Leginska (1886–1970), British pianist, conductor and composer
- Kate Loder (1825–1904), composer and pianist
- Iris Loveridge (1917–2000), English classical pianist specializing in British contemporary music
- Moura Lympany (1916–2005), concert pianist
- Joanna MacGregor (born 1959), concert pianist, conductor, composer and festival curator
- Elizabeth Norman McKay (1931–2018), musicologist, pianist and lieder accompanist
- Yaltah Menuhin (1921–2001), American-born British pianist, artist and poet
- Gayatri Nair (born 2001), Indian-British pianist and singer
- Anne Naysmith (1937–2015), classical pianist known for sleeping rough
- Marie Novello (1884–1928), Welsh professional pianist
- Maria Frances Parke (1772–1822), soprano, pianist and composer
- Annette Bryn Parri (fl. 2000s), Welsh classical pianist and accompanist
- Geraldine Peppin (1912–1980), influential teacher, performed with her twin sister Mary
- Mary Peppin (1912–1989), influential teacher, performed with her twin sister Geraldine
- Helen Perkin (1909–1996), English pianist and composer, premiered John Ireland's Piano Concerto
- Helen Pyke (1905–1954), English pianist, teacher and composer
- Jane Savage (c.1753–1824), harpsichordist and composer
- Irene Scharrer (1888–1971), English classical pianist and recording artist
- Phyllis Sellick (1911–2007), pianist and educator who performed with her husband Cyril Smith
- Millicent Silver (1905–1986), harpsichordist, pianist and violinist
- Kathryn Stott (born 1958), classical concert pianist and chamber musician
- Penelope Thwaites (fl. 1970s), British-Australian concert pianist and recording artist, specializing in the music of Percy Grainger
- Denise Tolkowsky (1918–1991), pianist and composer who settled in Belgium
- Valerie Tryon (born 1934), classical pianist who spends much of her time in Canada
- Mitsuko Uchida (born 1948), Japanese-born British classical pianist and conductor
- Adela Verne (1877–1952), prominent classical pianist of her era
- Mathilde Verne (1865–1936), concert pianist and educator
- Mary Wurm (1860–1938), pianist and composer who settled in Germany
- Di Xiao (fl. 1996), Chinese-British classical pianist

== United States ==
- Armenta Adams (born 1936), African-American concert pianist and educator
- Sophia Agranovich, Ukrainian-American pianist, recording artist, educator and artistic director
- Esther Allan (1914–1985), composer, pianist and organist
- Stell Andersen (1897–1989), international concert pianist
- Katja Andy (1907–2013), German-American pianist and educator
- Lydia Artymiw (fl. 1970s), concert pianist and educator
- Lola Astanova (born 1982), Uzbek-American pianist specializing in Chopin, Liszt and Rachmaninoff
- Lera Auerbach (born 1973), Russian-born American classical composer and pianist
- Dorothea Austin (1921–2011), Austrian-American pianist, composer and educator
- Nadia Azzi (born 1998), pianist of Lebanese-Japanese origin who has performed from an early age
- Blanche Hermine Barbot (1842–1919), Belgian-born pianist, educator and music director who settled in the United States
- Jennifer Margaret Barker (born 1965), Scottish-American composer and pianist
- Margaret Baxtresser (1922–2005), international concert pianist
- Amy Beach (1867–1944), composer and pianist
- Emily Bear (born 2001), composer, pianist and singer who has performed from an early age
- Sonya Belousova (born 1990), Russian-born American composer, pianist and recording artist
- Joan Benson (1925–2020), clavichordist, fortepianist and pianist
- Sondra Bianca (born 1930), concert pianist, educator and recording artist
- Fannie Bloomfield Zeisler (1863–1927), Austrian-American concert pianist
- Birdie Blye (1871–1935), child prodigy who toured widely, later concert pianist
- Mary Louise Boehm (1924–2002), pianist and painter
- Margaret Bonds (1913–1972), early African American composer and pianist
- Elena Braslavsky (fl. 1980s), Russian-American international concert pianist and chamber musician
- Allison Brewster Franzetti (fl. 1974), pianist, music educator and recording artist
- Antonia Brico (1902–1989), Dutch-American conductor and pianist
- Judith Burganger (born 1939), pianist and educator
- Winifred Byrd (1884–1970), concert pianist and educator
- Sarah Cahill (born 1960), pianist, music writer and radio host
- Angelin Chang (fl. 1990s), award-winning pianist and educator
- Abbey Perkins Cheney (born 1851), pianist and educator
- Gloria Cheng (fl. 2000s), contemporary music pianist and film director
- Kate Sara Chittenden (1856–1949), piano teacher and music school founder
- Naida Cole (born 1974), Canadian-American concert pianist
- Sylvia Constantinidis (born 1962), Venezuelan-America pianist, composer and conductor
- Mildred Couper (1887–1974), prominent composer and pianist experimenting with quarter-tone music
- Cindy Cox (born 1961), composer and pianist
- Évelyne Crochet (born 1934), French-born American classical pianist
- Bella Davidovich (born 1928), Soviet-born American pianist and educator
- Sharon Davis (born 1937), composer, pianist and music publisher
- Karin Dayas (1892–1971), pianist and music educator
- Simone Dinnerstein (born 1972), classical pianist noted for recordings of Bach's Goldberg Variations
- Ania Dorfmann (1899–1984), Russian-born American pianist and educator
- Marylène Dosse (born 1939), French-born American pianist and educator
- Yelena Eckemoff (fl. 1991), Russian-American pianist, composer and educator
- Reena Esmail (born 1983), pianist and composer
- Florence Kirsch Du Brul (1915–2005), concert pianist and educator
- Elisenda Fábregas (born 1955), Spanish-born American pianist and composer
- Amy Fay (1844–1928), pianist and writer
- Nohema Fernández (born 1944), Cuban-born American pianist and educator
- Chloe Flower (born 1985), composer, writer, producer and pianist
- Liana Forest (fl. 1990s), Russian-born pianist and recording artist based in the United States
- Madeleine Forte (born 1938), French-American pianist, recording artist and educator
- Vera Franceschi (1926–1966), Italian-American pianist specializing in Chopin
- Gabriela Lena Frank (born 1972), pianist and contemporary music composer
- Elinor Freer (fl. 2000s), pianist and educator
- Alice Frisca (1900–1960), concert pianist
- Umi Garrett (born 2000), American-Japanese classical pianist
- Mona Golabek (fl. 1970s), concert pianist, writer and radio host
- Edna Golandsky (fl. 1970s), pianist and educator
- Martha Goldstein (1919–2014), harpsichordist and pianist
- Patricia Goodson (born 1954), American pianist based in the Czech Republic
- Thomasina Talley Greene (1913–2003), African-American concert pianist and educator
- Bonnie Gritton (fl. 1970s), music educator and concert pianist
- Helen Eugenia Hagan (1891–1964), African American pianist, educator and composer
- Elizabeth Joanetta Catherine von Hagen (1750–1809), Dutch-born pianist, educator and composer who lived in the United States
- Emilie Hammarskjöld (1821–1854), Swedish-born American composer, singer, pianist, educator and organist
- Hazel Harrison (1883–1969), African American concert pianist
- Babette Hierholzer (born 1957), German-American pianist and artistic director
- Natalie Hinderas (1927–1987), African American pianist and educator
- Mary Howe (1882–1964), composer and pianist
- Helen Huang (born 1982), Chinese-American pianist and educator
- Claire Huangci (born 1990), classical pianist of Chinese origin
- Adella Prentiss Hughes (1869–1950), pianist, impresario, founder of the Cleveland Orchestra
- Jennifer Hymer (fl. 1990s), American pianist based in Hamburg, Germany
- Lilian Kallir (1931–2004), Czech-born American pianist
- Tara Kamangar (fl. 2005), pianist and composer
- Constance Keene (1921–2005), pianist and educator
- Anne Gamble Kennedy (1920–2001), African American pianist, accompanist and educator
- Nina Gamble Kennedy (born 1960), African American pianist, conductor, filmmaker and writer
- Olga Kern (born 1975), Russian-American classical pianist
- Minuetta Kessler (1914–2002), Russian-born American concert pianist, composer and educator
- Angela Jia Kim (fl. 1990s), classical pianist
- Dina Koston (c.1929–2009), pianist, music educator and composer
- Min Kwon (fl. 1990s), Korean-American pianist and educator
- Ruth Laredo (1937–2005), concert pianist remembered for recordings of Rachmaninoff
- Mihae Lee (fl. 1970s), South Korean-born American pianist and chamber musician
- Soyeon Kate Lee (born 1979), Korean-American pianist and educator
- Xenia Boodberg Lee (1927–2004), concert pianist playing modern works
- Tina Lerner (1889–c. 1947), Russian-American concert pianist and educator
- Ray Lev (1912–1968), concert pianist and recording artist
- Beth Levin (born 1950), classical pianist
- Rosina Lhévinne (1880–1976), Ukrainian-born American pianist and educator
- Gertrude Lightstone Mittelmann (1907–1956), concert pianist and broadcaster
- Ang Li (born 1985), classical concert pianist featured in broadcasts and recordings
- Jenny Lin (born 1973), Taiwanese-American concert pianist
- Valentina Lisitsa (born 1973), Ukrainian-American concert pianist and popular recording artist
- Barbara Lister-Sink (born 1947), pianist, educator and leader in injury-preventive keyboard technique
- Kate Liu (born 1994), Singaporean-American pianist specializing in Chopin
- Katherine Allen Lively, American pianist, writer and songwriter
- Oksana Lutsyshyn (born 1964), Ukrainian-American recording artist, pianist and educator
- Gulimina Mahamuti (born 1978), Uyghur Chinese-born American concert pianist
- Mana-Zucca (1885–1981), actress, singer, pianist and composer
- Adele Marcus (1906–1995), pianist and educator
- Melissa Marse (born 1974), pianist and chamber musician
- Anne-Marie McDermott (born 1963), classical pianist and chamber musician
- Louise Meiszner (1924–2008), pianist and music educator
- Susan Merdinger (born 1962), classical pianist, music director and educator
- Yolanda Mero (1887–1963), Hungarian-American pianist, opera and theatre impresario and philanthropist
- Beata Moon (born 1969), Korean-American pianist and composer
- Marilyn Neeley (1937–2007), award-winning pianist
- Soon Hee Newbold (fl. 2000s), composer, conductor, musician and actress
- Ethel Newcomb (1875–1959), pianist who opened a music studio in New York
- Quynh Nguyen (fl. 1987), Vietnamese-American classical pianist
- Erika Nickrenz (born 1963), classical pianist and chamber musician
- Grace Nikae (fl. 1990s), Japanese-American concert pianist and chamber musician
- Barbara Nissman (born 1944), pianist specializing in Alberto Ginastera and Sergei Prokofiev
- Heather O'Donnell (born 1973), classical pianist
- Ursula Oppens (born 1944), concert pianist and educator
- Margaret Saunders Ott (1920–2010), pianist and educator
- Our Lady J (fl. 2000s), pianist, television writer and producer
- Terry Winter Owens (1941–2007), composer, violinist, pianist, chamber musician and educator
- Natasha Paremski (born 1987), Russian-American classical pianist
- Margaret Patrick (1913–1994), African American member of the Ebony and Ivory duo
- Beverley Peck Johnson (1904–2001), voice teacher, soprano and pianist
- Rebecca Penneys (born 1946), pianist, chamber musician and educator
- Navah Perlman (fl. 1986), pianist and chamber musician
- Sally Pinkas (fl. 1983), Israeli-American pianist and educator
- Wynne Pyle (1881–1971), concert pianist
- Eda Rapoport (1890–1968), Lativian-American composer and pianist
- Liza Redfield (1924–2018), conductor, pianist and composer
- Caroline Keating Reed (d. 1954), American pianist and music teacher
- Nadia Reisenberg (1904–1983), Lithuanian-American pianist and educator
- Blanche Robinson (1863–1969), composer and piano accompanist
- Martha Baird Rockefeller (1895–1971), pianist, philanthropist and arts advocate
- Kathryn Salfelder (born 1987), composer, conductor and pianist
- Olga Samaroff (1880–1948), pianist, music critic and educator
- Lucy Scarbrough (1927–2020), pianist, conductor and educator
- Madeline Schiller (1843–1911), British-born American pianist and educator
- Helen Schnabel (1911–1974), pianist and recording artist
- Philippa Schuyler (1931–1967), African American child prodigy, concert pianist and journalist
- Marthe Servine (died 1972), French-American pianist and composer
- Orli Shaham (born 1975), concert pianist, chamber musician and radio presenter
- Regina Shamvili (fl. 2000s), Georgian-American pianist performing internationally
- Marilyn Shrude (born 1946), contemporary classical pianist and educator
- Bella Shumiatcher (1911–1990), Russian-American pianist and music educator
- Faye-Ellen Silverman (born 1947), composer, pianist and educator
- Lori Sims (fl. 1990s), classical pianist and educator
- Ruth Slenczynska (1925–2026), classical pianist who performed from an early age
- Julia Smith (1905–1989), composer, pianist and music writer
- Eleanor Sokoloff (1914–2020), pianist and educator
- Teresa Sterne (1927–2000), pianist and record producer
- Grete Sultan (1906–2005), German-American pianist and educator
- Kathleen Supové (fl. 2000s), pianist specializing in modern classical music
- Nina Svetlanova (born 1932), Russian-American concert pianist and educator
- Gloria Wilson Swisher (born 1935), composer, music educator and pianist
- Margaret Leng Tan (born 1945), Singaporean-born American pianist, often using unconventional instruments
- Marioara Trifan (born 1950), internationally performing pianist and conductor
- Rosalyn Tureck (1913–2003), pianist, harpsichordist and Bach specialist
- Aline van Barentzen (1897–1981), Franco-American classical pianist
- Isabelle Vengerova (1877–1956), Russian-American pianist and music educator
- Amelia von Ende (1856–1932), Polish-American writer, pianist, composer, educator and translator
- Lucille Wallace (1898–1977), American-born harpsichordist who settled in English
- Elinor Remick Warren (1900–1991), composer of contemporary classical music and pianist
- Janice Weber (born 1950), pianist and novelist
- Gertrude Weinstock (1904–1985), concert pianist
- Wu Han (born 1959), Taiwanese-American pianist, recording artist, educator and cultural entrepreneur
- Julianne Vanden Wyngaard (fl. 1960s), carillonist and pianist
- Oxana Yablonskaya (born 1938), Russian-American international concert pianist and recording artist
- Sophia Yan (born 1986), classical pianist and international journalist
- Berenika Zakrzewski (born 1983), international concert pianist who has performed since she was 8
- Marion Zarzeczna (fl. 1950s), concert pianist and educator
- Lauren Zhang (born 2001), classical pianist, winner of the 2018 BBC Young Musician Contest
- Serene, American classical concert pianist and technologist.

== Uruguay ==
- Dinorah Varsi (1939–2013), classical pianist

== Uzbekistan ==
- Gulnora Alimova (born 1971), classical pianist
- Anna Malikova (born 1965), concert pianist, recording artist and educator

== Venezuela ==
- Corin Akl Jáuregui (born 1966), composer, pianist, educator
- Teresa Carreño (1853–1917), pianist, soprano, composer and conductor
- Gabriela Montero (born 1970), classical pianist and improvisation specialist
- Alba Quintanilla (born 1944), composer, harpist, harpsichordist, pianist, conductor and educator
- Clara Rodríguez (born 1970)

== See also ==
- Lists of women in music
- Women in classical music
