= Tribal music =

Tribal music may refer to:

- Indigenous music, music traditional to indigenous peoples of the world
- World music, various forms of non-Western music
- Tribal house, a subgenre of house music inspired by indigenous musical percussion
