= Ljiljana Vukajlović =

Serbian pianist and accompanist

Ljiljana Vukajlović is a Serbian pianist and accompanist.

== Education ==
She graduated from the Belgrade Music Academy, where she also completed her postgraduate studies in Piano Performance (1966) as a student of Professor Olga Mihajlović.

== Career ==
In addition to giving concerts as a soloist and chamber musician, she served for many years as an accompanist at the Faculty of Music in Belgrade and Faculty of Arts of Priština.
