= Veronica Rudian =

Italian pianist, producer, and poet

- Born: 1990 (age 35–36); Bordighera, Italy
- Origin: Italian
- Genres: Classical music
- Occupations: Pianist, musician
- Instrument: Piano
- Label: Enorecords LLC
- Website: https://enorecordsllc.com/

Veronica Rudian, (born on 15 June 1990) is an Italian pianist, producer, and poet. In 2009, she was nominated for official testimony (brand ambassador) to UNICEF and she won. She is popularly known for her album "Hell's Angels" which she toured with internationally and performed also as a guest artist at Sanremo Music Festival.

== Biography ==
Veronica Rudian was born in Bordighera a province of Liguria in Italy.

== Music career ==
She is a professional pianist, composer and a film soundtrack producer. Veronica started her musical career professionally at the age of five years, winning national and international competitions. She claimed to be inspired by Bob Dylan. "I taught myself to be a prominent pianist and a composer" she said in Italian national newspaper La Stampa. This became one of her most quoted statements during interviews with the media. Her five years music collaboration and international music tour with Bob Dylan's Band's multi-instrumentalist Donnie Herron earned her an international stardom. She has performed as a solo pianist in prestigious ceremonies, such as Sanremo Music Festival. In 2005, she moved to Warsaw to perform Chopin's music. In 2009, she was endorsed by UNICEF at Imperia for her artistic merit. In 2009, she released her debut album in a CD format, produced and recorded by UNICEF classical music. In 2010, she recorded her second album for an indie imprint, Presingmusicltd, entitled "Hell's Angels" which sold 15,000 units. In 2011, she composed Christmas commercial for Vodafone. In 2011, she won the Woman of the Year Award in Lugano, with a total of 900 female recipients, from all over the world, she became third Italian to receive the prestigious award after a former tennis player Lea Pericoli and the Italian scientist Rita Levi Montalcini. In 2012, she also received University of Peace an honorary academic diploma "Honoris Causa" in Lugano. In 2016, Veronica Rudian composed and produced a young Ligurian singer who participated in "Ti Lascio Una Canzone" produced by RAI conducted by Clerici reaching the finals. In 2018, she performed rotational concerts to raising funds for the earthquake-vices of Marche, Emilia and Umbria in Italy. In 2019, she did a concert to raise a huge sum for the displaced families of the Morandi bridge that collapsed in Genoa, leaving several families homeless.

== See also ==
- List of women classical pianists
