= Helza Cameu =

- Born: March 28, 1903; Rio de Janeiro, Brazil
- Died: 1995
- Occupations: Composer, Pianist

Helza Cameu (March 28, 1903 – March 1995) was a Brazilian composer, pianist, musicologist, and author. Winning national competitions with her compositions, she worked as a musicologist at the National Museum, preserving indigenous music and cataloguing instruments. She also gave lectures at the National School of Music and was enrolled in the Brazilian Academy of Music in 1946.

== Biography ==
Cameu was born on March 28, 1903, in the city Rio de Janeiro. At the age of 7, she began learning to play the piano, later studying at Colégio Pedro II. She auditioned under Brazilian composer Alberto Nepomuceno in 1919, and was allowed to enter the National Institute of Music. Within a year, Nepomuceno died and she became the pupil of João Nunes, graduating with a gold medal in 1923. She furthered her studies in composition, training under Francisco Braga, Agnelo França, and Oscar Lorenzo Fernández.

In 1929, Cameu recorded indigenous music for the National Museum and became interested in adapting indigenous music for choral presentations. Working with museum director, Edgar Roquette-Pinto, to transcribe phonograph recordings to preserve indigenous music, she studied their music forms. In 1934, Cameu debuted her own first composition at the National Institute of Music's salon. In 1936, she presented, in a performance at the Brazilian Conservatory of Music, her String Quartet in B Minor, Op. 12, later entering the composition in a competition started by the São Paulo Department of Culture. Her composition won second place on May 10, 1937. She again entered a composition in a competition, her symphonic poem Suplício by Felipe dos Santos, winning first place from the Brazilian Symphonic Orchestra and Press Department in 1943. The following year her Sinfonia concertante (Quadro sinfonico) won a Brazilian Symphony Orchestra (Orquestra Sinfônica Brasileira) competition. She entered the Brazilian Academy of Music in 1946, occupying chair N° 19.

Between 1955 and her retirement in 1973, Cameu served as program editor at Rádio MEC for the program Música e Músicos do Brasil (Music and Musicians of Brazil). Simultaneously, she lectured at the National School of Music and other civic organizations, and performed cataloguing and analysis at the National Museum. With the use of bibliographic references and museum documents, Cameu was the first to write about many types of indigenous instruments in Portuguese, separating the instruments by percussion, wind, and strings. The categories are further subdivided by how the instruments sound and the instrument's parts. Her style of writing, which proposes that comparisons of each ethnic group's music should be completed only after the music of those ethnic groups are understood, was considered innovative for Brazil. Brazilian ethnomusicologist Elizabeth Travassos wrote of Cameu in Music in Latin America and the Caribbean that the brief reference within the book could not "possibly do justice to the monumental contribution she made in her unprecedented effort at synthesis".

== Publications ==
Cameu wrote articles about indigenous music publishing in such journals as Revista Brasileira de Cultura, Revista Brasileira de Folclore, Revista do Conservatório Brasileiro de Música, and Jornal das Letras, among others. Her article Apontamentos sobre música indígena (Notes about Indigenous Music) was published in 1950 in the newspaper Tribuna da Imprensa. Another important work, Valor histórico de Brasílio Itiberê da Cunha e sua fantasia característica: A Sertaneja (The Historical Value of Brasílio Itiberê da Cunha and his characteristic fantasy: A Sertaneja), published in 1970 in the Brazilian Magazine of Culture. Her only published book, Introdução ao estudo da música indígena no Brasil (Introduction to the Study of Indigenous Music in Brazil, 1977), is one of the most complete studies undertaken on indigenous music in the country.
