= Nadezhda Dukstulskaite =

Lithuanian pianist

Nadezhda Dukstulskaite [alternative spelling Nadežda Dukstulskaitė; surname also written Dukshtulsky or Dukstulsky] (5 March 1912 – 2 October 1978) was a pianist whose concerts and recordings promoted international awareness of Lithuanian composers, and who influenced several generations of Lithuanian pianists, singers and other musicians. She was one of the few survivors of the Kovno Ghetto.

== Early life ==
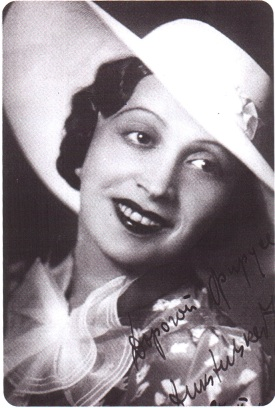
Nadezhda Dukstulskaite in the 1930s

Nadezhda Dukstulskaite was born in a Jewish family of musicians in what was then Dvinsk, part of the Russian Empire but is now the Latvian city of Daugavpils. Her talent manifested itself very early, during piano studies under her father, Martynas Dukstulskis, from age five, and from age seven at a private piano school in the Lithuanian city of Kaunas, where the family moved in 1918. At age 12 she was admitted to the Stern Conservatory in Berlin, where she studied for six years under the influential piano teacher Leonid Kreutzer, graduating in 1928. Shortly after returning to Kaunas, her father died unexpectedly. To support the family, she took a job playing piano at a cinema.

== Career to 1941 ==
From 1929 to 1941 her work in radio as well as concerts that she gave throughout Northern Europe (including many Lithuanian pieces in her repertoire) earned broad recognition for Lithuanian music at home and abroad. During this period, she was part of a core group of musicians who worked at the state-run Kaunas Radio to develop Lithuania's first music programs and concert broadcasts for radio.

== Wartime ==
With the invasion of Lithuania by Nazi Germany in 1941, she was detained in the Jewish ghetto in Kaunas (the Kovno Ghetto). She participated often in the concerts of the Kovno Ghetto Orchestra. She was held there until 1944, when she escaped from a work detail and then traveled to safety in Vilnius by foot.

== Post-war career ==
Remaining after the end of World War II in Lithuania, which was annexed by the Soviet Union, she in 1944 resumed her work as a radio pianist, concert pianist and accompanist, touring throughout the republics of the Soviet Union. Throughout this period, which continued until 1959, she made great personal efforts to help talented young musicians develop and mature.

== Later life ==
Due to poor health, in 1959 she formally retired, but nonetheless remained active. In fact, from 1959 right up until her death in 1978, she played a major role in the creation and development of the Ažuolukas choir and music school, helping many later accomplished musicians to take their first steps in music.

Prominent Lithuanian musicians who have attributed their achievements in part to studies under Nadezhda Dukstulskaite include the opera singer Vladimiras Prudnikovas, violoncellist Valentinas Kaplūnas, pianists Robertas Bekionis and Leonidas Melnikas, and violinist Kornelija Kalinauskaitė.

== See also ==
- Kovno Ghetto
- Lithuanian Jews
- Lithuanian musicians
