= Melissa Marse =

American classical pianist

Melissa Marse (born October 18, 1974) is an American classical pianist.

== Early life and education ==
Melissa Marse began piano study at the age of 2½ years with her mother, a private piano instructor. Her parents were musicians who met while attending music school at Indiana University. She began accompanying for school and community choirs at age 7. At age 8, she began formal piano lessons with Betty Mallard at The University of Texas at Austin, where she later obtained the Bachelor of Music in Piano Performance with Honors. In 1996, Marse moved to New Haven, Connecticut for graduate study at Yale University where her teachers were Claude Frank and Boris Berman. She subsequently moved to New York City, pursuing Professional Studies at The Juilliard School with Brian Zeger and the late Samuel Sanders in accompanying and Herbert Stessin in piano. Marse then moved to Boston, where she was later awarded the Doctorate in Musical Arts in Collaborative Studies from New England Conservatory. Her teachers there were Irma Vallecillo and the late Patricia Zander.

== Career ==
At age 16, Marse won the Texas Junior Miss Pageant and subsequently won the talent portion of America’s Junior Miss (renamed Distinguished Young Women) in 1992. Her first professional solo and chamber music concerts were held at the Victoria Bach Festival, where she was the New Young Artist at age 18. Marse spent five summers as a fellowship student at the Aspen Music Festival beginning at the age of 19. She performed under the baton of conductors including Michael Tilson Thomas, Yuri Temirkanov, and Lawrence Foster. In the summer of 1998, she lived in Japan where she performed regularly with the faculty of the Pacific Music Festival.

Marse has performed extensively throughout the world in solo, chamber, and orchestral concerts in American venues including Carnegie Hall, Alice Tully Hall, Steinway Hall, Gardner Museum, Morgan Library, Kennedy Center. Orchestras with whom she has been featured include Northeastern Pennsylvania Philharmonic, Austin Symphony, and Baton Rouge Symphony. She has been a guest artist for CarnegieKids as well as music director, coach, and pianist for the Metropolitan Opera’s "Growing Up With Opera". Collaborations include chamber music concerts with members of the New York Philharmonic, Hong Kong Philharmonic, London Symphony, Berlin Philharmonic, and Boston Symphony. She is an artist member of New York-based America’s Dream Chamber Artists and founder of Houston Chamber Music Society.

Marse has also served as a frequent competition adjudicator and master class presenter. Past academic appointments include Adjunct Faculty at Texas State University, vocal coach at Mannes Art Song Institute, and Teaching Fellow at Harvard University (where she received the Certificate of Distinction for her teaching). Most recently, she served as the head of the piano department at Houston Baptist University from 2006–2012. Marse sings and records regularly with the Grammy nominated ensemble Conspirare, conducted by Craig Hella Johnson.

== Personal life ==
Marse is married to Andy Hopwood. She currently resides in Houston and London.
