= Adelė Daunoravičiūtė =

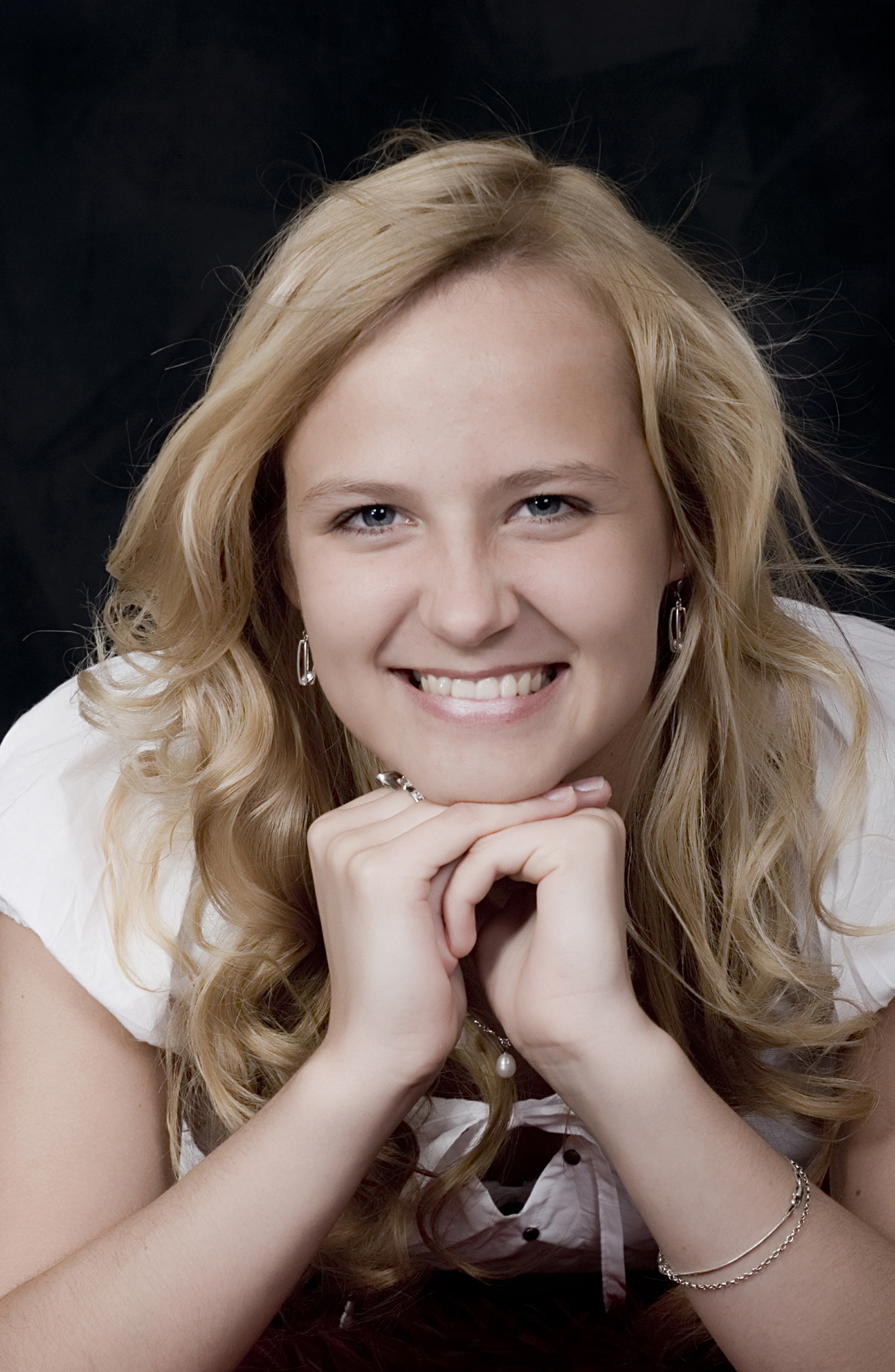

Background information
- Born: 29 April 1991 (age 34); Klaipėda, Lithuania
- Genres: Classical
- Occupation: Pianist
- Instrument: Piano
- Years active: 2001–present
- Website: musicpiano.lt

Adelė Daunoravičiūtė (/ædɛˈleɪ daʊˌnɒrɑːvɪˈtʃuːteɪ/; born 29 April 1991) is a Lithuanian pianist.

== Biography ==
Daunoravičiūtė was born in Klaipėda, Lithuania. She began her musical training at the Vyturio primary school with musical education (teacher – methodologist Edita Šapolaitė). From 2005 to 2009, she studied music at Klaipėda S. Šimkaus conservatoire with teacher-expert Jūratė Liutkienė. Since 2010 and until 2016, Daunoravičiūtė studied at the Klaipėda University of Arts Faculty in the Professor Tatjana Romashkina (Svobodina) piano class. There she acquired master's of music degree and bachelor's degree in education with performer as a professional qualification.

She participated in master classes with professors Petras Geniušas, Walter Groppenberger, Ksenia Knorre, Vladimir Slobodian, Alexander Puliaev, Albina Šikšniūtė, Zbignevas Ibelhauptas, Jurgis Karnavičius, Vera Nosina, Eleonora Thach, Aik Grygorian, 2010 – 'New music generation' – master classes and individual lessons with Alexei Grynyuk, Igor Lovchinsky, Miroslav Kultyshev, Kasparas Uinskas.

== Awards ==
- 2001, 2003 – Republican Piano Ensemble competition (Lithuania). 3rd-place winner.
- 2007 – VI Republican Competition in Memoriam W. A. Mozart (Lithuania). 3rd-place winner.
- 2007, 2008 – S. Šimkus Conservatoire Competition of Etudes (Lithuania). 2nd-place winner.
- 2008 – II pianist competition dedicated to win B. Ciplijauskaitė's prize (Lithuania). 3rd-place winner.
- 2009 – III pianist competition dedicated to win B. Ciplijauskaitė's prize (Lithuania). 1st-place winner.
- 2009 – VII Republican Competition in Memoriam S. Vainiūnas (Lithuania). 2nd-place winner.
- 2009 – IX international festival competition 'Music Without Limits' (Lithuania). Diplomant.
- 2010 – 'The art of the 21st century' festival competition (Italy). Solo category – 1st-place winner; Ensemble category – 1st-place winner.
- 2011 – 'The art of the 21st century' festival competition (Austria). Ensemble category – 1st-place winner.
- 2012 – 'The art of the 21st century' festival competition (Finland). Solo category – 1st-place winner; Ensemble category – 1st-place winner.
- 2012, 2013 – Presidential Antanas Smetona nominee scholarship (Lithuania).
- 2013 – Was established Cultural and art scholarship (Lithuania).
- 2013 – 'American Protégé' International Piano and Strings Competition (United States). Ensemble category – 1st-place winner.
- 2013 – 'The art of the 21st century' festival competition (Lithuania). Solo category – 1st-place winner; Ensemble category – 1st-place winner.
- 2014 – 'The art of the 21st century' festival competition (Lithuania). Ensemble category – Grand Prix.
- 2014 – 'American Protégé' International Piano and Strings Competition (USA). Solo category – 1st-place winner.
- 2014 – 'Adolf and Michael Gottlieb' International Piano Ensemble Competition (Russia). Diplomant.
- 2014 – The Švyturys Klaipėda's Future Scholarship was established by 'Švyturys-Utenos Alus' Company (Lithuania).
- 2015 – 'The art of the 21st century' festival competition (Portugal). Solo category – 1st-place winner; Ensemble category – Grand Prix.
- 2016 – International piano competition "Concours musical de France" (France). First round – 1st-place winner; Final round – 5th-place winner.

2011, 2012, 2013, 2014, 2015 – Recipient of five presidential awards for high achievement in music on international arena. Personally awarded by the President of Lithuania Dalia Grybauskaitė.
