= Zhivka Klinkova =

Bulgarian musician (1924–2002)

- Born: 30 July 1924; Samokov, Sofia, Bulgaria
- Died: 23 December 2002 (aged 78); Sofia, Bulgaria
- Occupation(s): Composer; Pianist; Conductor

Zhivka Klinkova (Bulgarian: Живка Клинкова; 30 July 1924 – 23 December 2002) was a Bulgarian composer, pianist and conductor, who was the laureate of the World Youth Festival in Bucharest in 1953. She also received a diploma from Pope John Paul II in 1981 for her opera Cyril and Methodius.

== Early life and education ==
Zhivka Klinkova was born in Samokov, Bulgaria on 30 July 1924. She attended the Sofia Academy of Music, where she was taught composition by Parashkev Hadjiev and piano by Dimitar Nenov. She graduated from the academy in 1951, then continued her studies with Rudolf Wagner-Régeny and Boris Blacher at the Berlin Hochschule für Musik.

== Career ==
After she graduated from the academy she began work as a conductor with the state-sponsored Kutev Folkloric Folksong and Dance Company, and she became the only female orchestral director of a professional Bulgarian folk group. She also composed works for the group's repertoire and worked there until 1960. She subsequently, she travelled to Germany to study, and was taught by Rudolf Wagner-Régeny from 1960 to 1966 and then by Boris Blacher in Berlin from 1966 to 1968. After she finished her studies, she began work as a freelance composer and wrote ballets, opera and a musical, and a majority of them were performed in Czechoslovakia and Germany. Klinkova's works were inspired by Bulgarian folk music yet contained contemporary themes, such as racial oppression in Quenny, the Little Negro and comparing the world of fairies in her ballet Than saen ("Vietnamese Poem") to the war-torn Vietnam.

In 1953, Klinkova was selected to be the laureate of the World Festival of Youth and Students which was being held in Bucharest. In 1981, she was awarded a diploma by Pope John Paul II in recognition of her opera Cyril and Methodius, a copy of which is held in the Vatican.

Klinkova wrote the opera-ballet Olimpijski ustrem, Sănjat na Kuberten to celebrate the 1996 Summer Olympics held in Atlanta, Georgia.

== Death ==
Klinkova died in Sofia on 23 December 2002, at the age of 78.

== Works ==
Selected works include:

- Petko Samohvalko [Boastful Petko] (children’s op, N. Trendafilova), 1956
- Kaliakra (ballet, S. Aladjov), 1966,
- Than saen [Vietnamese Poem] (ballet, L.N. Kanh), 1972
- Quenny, the Little Negro (children’s ballet, Klinkova), 1973
- Isle of Dreams (musical, P. Panchev), Teplice, 1978
- The Most Improbable (fairy-tale op, Klinkova), 1980
- Cyril and Methodius (opera, V. Markovski and J. Gyermek), 1981
- Bydgoszcz, 1986
- Vassil Levski (opera, Klinkova), 1992
- Olimpijski ustrem, Sanjat na Kuberten [Olympic Endeavour, Coubertin’s Dream] (rock op-ballet, Klinkova), 1995
- Sofia (opera, Klinkova), 1996
- Sinfonietta no.1, 1960
- Bulgarian Sym. Suite no.1, 1963
- Violin Concerto, 1964
- Ballad, 1972
- Concerto, 2 violin, strings, 1973
- Symphony no.2, 1974
- Cantata, chorus, orchestra, 1982
- Pianoforte Concerto, strings, 1992
- Pianoforte Sonata, 1950
- Trio, bagpipes, 1955
- Sonata, violin, piano, 1963
- Sonata, flute, viola, 1969
- Duo, 2 kavals, 1972
- Trio, flute, oboe, bassoon, 1974
- 7 Frescoes, 2 flutes, 1975
- 8 Preludes, 2 flutes, 1975
- 10 Pieces, folk ensemble, 1978
