= Emma Martínez de la Torre Shelton =

Cuban pianist & composer (1889–1980)

- Born: 15 January 1889; Camagüey, Cuba
- Died: 15 January 1980 (aged 91); Havana, Cuba
- Musical career
- Occupations: Musician, composer
- Instrument: Piano

Emma Martínez de la Torre Shelton (sometimes y Shelton) (15 January 1889 – 1980) was a Cuban-born pianist and composer long active in the Canary Islands.

Martínez was born in Havana, and moved with her family to Cádiz at the age of three. After lessons at that city's Santa Cecilia Academy and with Rafael Toniasi Requena in Madrid, she traveled to Rome for further work at the Accademia Nazionale di Santa Cecilia. She then settled in Tenerife, where she continued her studies with Santiago Sabina Corona. She worked as an accompanist to Néstor de la Torre between 1909 and 1917; she taught at the island's conservatory, and was otherwise heavily active in the musical life of the community as performer and concert organizer. As a composer Martínez was self-taught; most of her output dates to late in her career, and includes orchestral works as well as chamber music and songs.
