= Tatsiana Zelianko =

Belarus-born composer and pianist (born 1980)

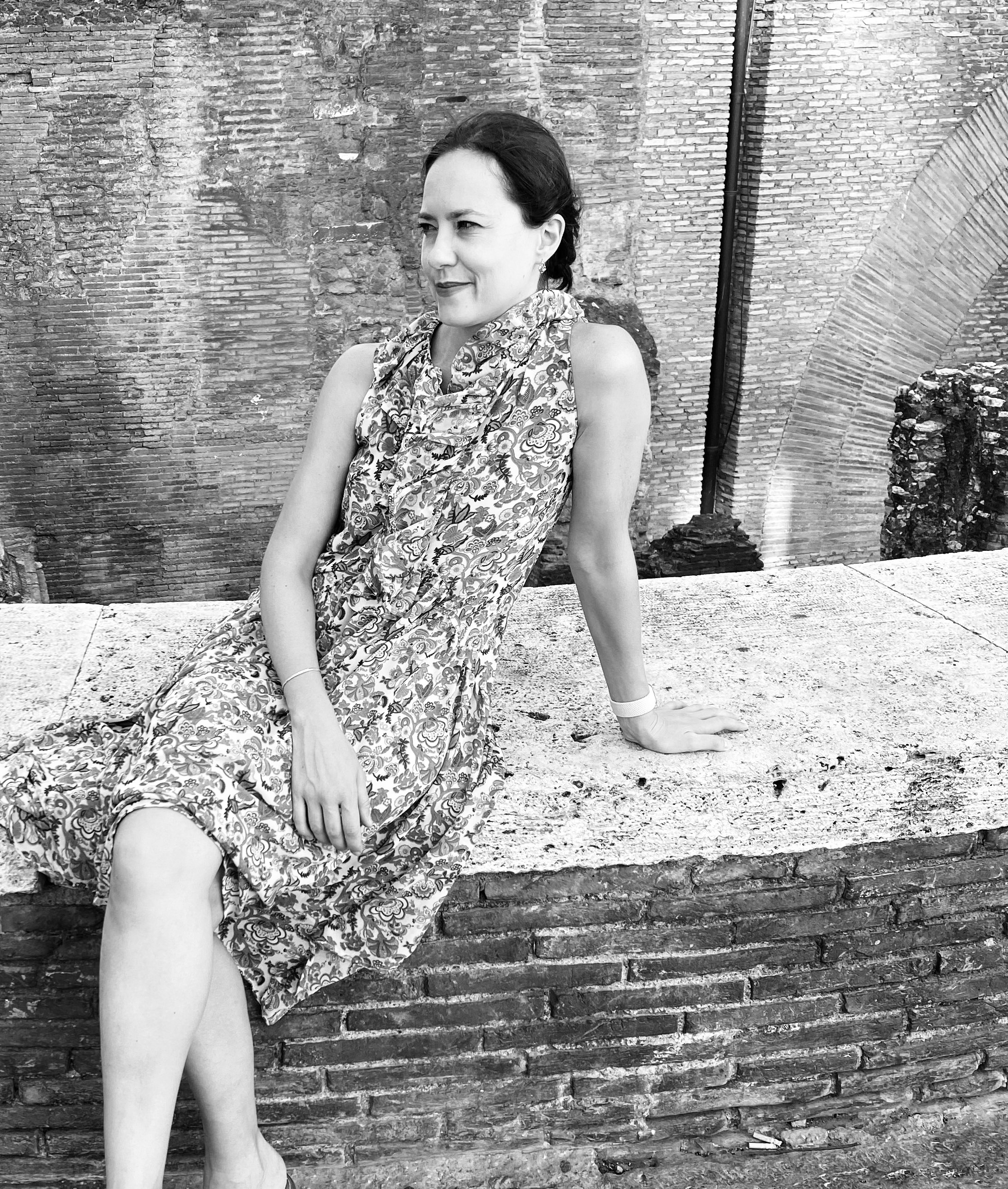
Tatsiana Zelianko

Tatsiana Zelianko (born 1980) is a composer and pianist in Luxembourg. Originally from Belarus, she was trained at the Academy of Music in Minsk, where she obtained a Master's in instrumental performance (piano) and graduated as a piano teacher and chamber artist. She then worked at the Philharmonic of Brest, Belarus, as a concert pianist.

After moving to Luxembourg in 2008, she turned to contemporary composition and began studying writing and musical analysis at the Conservatoire de la Ville de Luxembourg, of which she won two first prizes. In 2015, she won first prize in the Senior section at the International Composition Competition “Artistes en Herbes” in Luxembourg. A year later, Tatsiana Zelianko obtained governmental artist status in Luxembourg.

She has to her credit several dozen diverse and varied musical creations. The composer has already carried out a large number of musical commissions in Luxembourg in collaboration with Noise Watchers Unlimited, the CAPe, National Literature Center of Mersch, fr:Ensemble Lucilin, fr:Ars Musica, the CID | Fraen an Gender, the Philharmonie Luxembourg and the Ministry of Culture of Luxembourg.

Her partitions have been created in other countries such as France, the UK, Belarus and Bulgaria. Since 2013, her works have been included in the catalog of the "Luxembourg Music Publishers a. s. b. l.» bringing together Luxembourgish composers.

In 2015, she carried out several State commissions, including one from the Philharmonie Luxembourg as part of the Rainy Days Festival in co-production with the Cinémathèque de la Ville de Luxembourg. The 90-minute work was composed for a cine-concert based on Alfred Hitchcock's film The Lodger. Its world premiere was performed by United Instruments of Lucilin under the direction of David Reiland, on November 25, 2015, at the Philharmonie Luxembourg.

In 2018, the composer was honored for the 18th edition of the Festival Musiciennes à Ouessant (le Conquet, Ouessant, Molène, Brittany, France). The same year Tatsiana Zelianko became the sixth recipient of the Arts and Letters Prize of the Grand Ducal Institute, intended to encourage young designers in Luxembourg.

In 2021, with some delays due to the COVID 19 pandemic, the piece Un Songe Austral, for string quartet and dancer, commissioned by United Instruments of Licilin, had its world premiere in Bergen, Norway during the Avgarde Festival. The piece was then replayed in the Grand Duchy the same week.

In 2021, as part of the ARS musica Festival, a commission from ARS musica the piece Niwwelsequenz, a work for voice, piano and Martenot waves, was premiered at the Arsonic in Mons, Belgium.

In 2024, a portal was dedicated to Tatsiana Zelianko on the MuGi.lu website, which, in addition to a biography, also presents selected materials on the composer's life and work, such as music, scores, concert programmes, press articles, photos, correspondence, radio broadcasts, videos and much more.
