= Guo Shan =

Chinese pianist

Guo Shan (Chinese: 郭珊; pinyin: Guo Shan, Mandarin pronunciation: [Guo Shan]) (born November 7, 1946, Beijing) is a Chinese contemporary classical pianist. She is the current Chairwoman of the Alliance of Asia-Pacific Region Orchestras and the president of China Symphony Development Foundation.
