= Victoire Ferrari =

French pianist

Victoire Henry known in later life as Madame Ferrari (24 June 1785 – after 1823) was a French pianist as a young woman and later a famed singing teacher. She was born in Paris. Her husband was Giacomo Ferrari, a minor composer whose piano concertos Victoire often performed, along with those of Joseph Wolfl, Daniel Steibelt, and her own teacher, Johann Baptist Cramer.

She was daughter of the dancing master Monsieur Henri. She studied from the age of seven under "Kreusser" (either Peter Anton Kreusser or George Anton Kreusser), later under Cramer.

She married Giacomo Gotifredo Ferrari in London in 1804, and the couple had a son, Adolfo Angelico Ferrari (1807-1870), who became a singer, but later the couple separated, with Ferrari in Edinburgh and Madame Ferrari in Brighton.
