= Victoria Audrey Sarasvathi =

- Born: 1 July 1997 (age 29); Jakarta, Indonesia
- Education: Hochschule für Musik, Theater und Medien Hannover; Jakarta Conservatory of Music
- Occupation: pianist
- Awards: Robert Schumann Small Piano Competition in Zwickau, Germany, 2012; Aarhus International Piano Competition in Aarhus, Denmark, 2013, and others
- Musical career
- Genres: classical music
- Instrument: piano
- Years active: 2006–present

Victoria Audrey Sarasvathi (born July 1, 1997 in Jakarta) is an Indonesian-German concert classical pianist.

She started playing piano at the age of 3 with her mother and started her bachelor'sdegree at the age of 15 with Roland Krüger at the University for Music, Drama and Media Hannover, Germany. She studied for her master's degree and now has completed her postgraduate with Arie Vardi at the same university. In the past she studied at the Jakarta Conservatory of Music with Iswargia Sudarno.

In 2019 together with violinist Sebastian Nowak she created Duo Sarasvathi-Nowak and won first Prize at European Chamber Music Competition in Karlsruhe, Germany, first prize at Harald Genzmer Interpretation Competition in Munich (Germany), 1st Prize at Cosima Wagner International Chamber Music Competition in Bellagio (Italy), 3rd Prize at Stasys Vainiunas International Chamber Music Competition in Vilnius (Lithuania) and 3rd Prize at Anton Garcia Abril International Chamber Music Competition in Baza-Granada (Spain).

She won Yamaha Scholarship Europe in Germany in 2014 https://de.yamaha.com/de/news_events/2014/20140217_ymfe2014_de.html In 2013, Victoria won the second prize at Aarhus International Piano Competition in Aarhus, Denmark.

In 2012 she won first prize and special prize at Robert Schumann Small Piano Competition in Zwickau, Germany https://www.schumann-zwickau.de/en/02/kleiner-schumann-wettbewerb/preistraeger.php

In 2006, she won the gold prize of the 2nd Asean International Chopin Piano competition in Kuala Lumpur Malaysia and 7th ASIA International CHOPIN Piano Competition in Tokyo, JAPAN. In 2007, at the age of 10, she won the first prize of the Asia International Piano Academy and Festival in Korea.

In 2008, she was invited by Dan Zhao Yi to participate in the “International Children Exchange Concert” at Shenzhen, China. That same year, she was the youngest pianist performing in Hengelo, Netherlands at their Gala Winner Concert “International Piano Competition for Young Musicians.” In 2008, she won the International Piano Competition for Young Pianists in Enschede, Netherlands. During the years 2010-2013 she was at the Institute for the early promotion of musically talented students (IFF) at the University of Music, Drama and Media in Hanover.

Victoria has performed at the Sendesaal Bremen, Konzerthaus Berlin, NDR Hannover and the Copenhagen Concert Hall. She gave a solo concert in the Cognito concert series in TriBühne Norderstedt in 2015 and, in 2016, she played Beethoven Triple Concerto op.56 with Göttingen Symphony Orchestra under the direction of Christoph-Mathias Mueller.
