= Victoria Foust =

Victoria Foust (Виктория Фауст)
- Born: 25 May 1975 (age 51)
- Education: St. Petersburg Conservatory "Rimsky-Korsakov"
- Occupations: Pianist and Composer
- Style: Classic
- Website: http://www.victoriafoust.com

Victoria Foust (Russian, Виктория Фауст; born May 25, 1975, in Ural Mountains, Soviet Union), Is a classical pianist and Russian composer noted for her performance of various musical styles, acclaimed for her "passionate and refined" way of playing beyond the limits of traditional concerts creating new styles of music shows where the piano interacts with poetry and visual art through a captivating scenic setting.

== Early life ==
Victoria Foust begins with the piano at the age 4, when she makes her first composition "on the black keys". From then on, from the age 5 heshe began her professional studies at the music school of her hometown in Ural Mountains (Russia) earning early childhood composition and interpretation competitions.

== Career ==
She began her musical education at the Grammar School of the Urals Conservatory (Yekaterinburg) to enter the Conservatory "Rimsky-Korsakov" (St. Petersburg) in the specialty of Piano, Organ and Harpsichord.

He has given numerous recitals and concerts in different stages of Russia, Finland, Germany, and Peru, with important successes. In his interpretive versatility he has performed as a soloist with Bachian Orquesta, from São Paulo, Brazil; The Symphony Orchestra and Santa Cecilia Sinfonietta, both from Peru; The Ural Symphony Orchestra in Russia and Soloists of the Mariinski Theater in St. Petersburg, among many others.
