= Sharon Davis (composer) =

American composer

Sharon Davis (born 1937) is a classical composer, pianist and music publisher. She is best known for her works Suite of Wildflowers, op. 1; Three Moods of Emily Dickinson; and Three Poems of William Blake. Her Though Men Call Us Free, written for soprano, clarinet and piano, draws upon words from Oscar Wilde's The Young King. In the 1970s she performed with the Los Angeles Brass Quintet, and Chamber Music Quarterly described her as a "fine musician". Davis is the widow of composer William Schmidt and now manages his music publishing company, Western International Music Inc., in Greeley, Colorado.
