= Vera Moore =

New Zealand pianist (1896–1997)

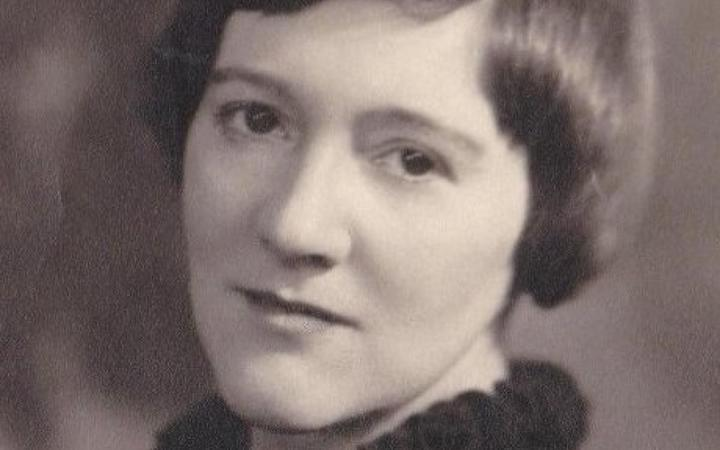

Background information
- Born: 15 August 1896; Dunedin, New Zealand
- Died: 8 March 1997 (aged 100) Versailles, Yvelines, France
- Genres: Classical
- Occupation: Pianist
- Years active: 1903–1963

Vera Josephine Moore (1896–1997) was a New Zealand concert pianist. She is considered to be the first New Zealand pianist to gain international recognition.

== Early life ==
Moore was born in Dunedin, the youngest of five children of Herbert and Charlotte Moore. The family was a musical one - her father was a church organist and a piano teacher, and her older brother Frederick later became a professor of piano at the Royal Academy of Music in London. Another brother, Irvin, became a church organist in Gisborne, in the North Island of New Zealand. Following lessons at home, Moore began entering piano competitions at the age of 7, in 1903. She competed in Dunedin and Christchurch competitions, gaining many first-placings. She also won first prize of a grand piano at a Christchurch competition when aged 16, in 1912.

== Career ==
From 1917 Moore performed as a soloist and as an accompanist at recitals around the South Island. She moved to England in 1920, where she initially studied piano under her brother Frederick, followed by four years as a pupil of Leonard Borwick. In the 1920s, Moore became friends with the artist Winifred Nicholson, and was the subject in one of Nicholson's paintings, Woman Playing a Piano.

Moore enjoyed a successful performing career in England and Europe, receiving particular acclaim for her renditions of the work of Debussy and Chopin. Indeed, in 1931 Debussy's widow attended a concert by Moore and wrote her a congratulatory note for her "exquisite" performance. Moore returned to New Zealand for visits and to give recitals in 1924 and 1928. In 1928, she stopped en route in Melbourne to perform at the Melbourne University Conservatorium of Music. Her Christchurch concert in the same year was described by critics as "phenomenal".

On occasion, when her brother Frederick was overseas examining for the Associated Board of the Royal Academy, Moore took his place at the Royal Academy.

In the late 1930s, Moore was frequently invited to perform for BBC broadcasts. In 1937, she performed as part of the BBC's New Zealand Day radio broadcast.

In 1962 Moore retired to a small French village near Paris, Jouy-en-Josas, where she provided private tutoring in piano, poetry and philosophy. Amongst her students were mezzo-soprano Sophie Koch and pianist Pierre-Alain Volondat.

== Personal life ==
Moore met the Romanian artist Constantin Brâncuși in 1931, when their mutual friend, art critic H. S. Ede, invited Brâncuși to one of Moore's concerts. The couple began a relationship, and in 1934 she gave birth to their son, John Moore. Brâncuși never acknowledged his son as his own.
