= Berenika Glixman =

Israeli pianist

Berenika Glixman (Hebrew: ברניקה גליקסמן; born 1984 in Tiraspol, Soviet Union) is an Israeli classical pianist. She has won several awards, including First Prize at the Young Artist Competition held by Israeli Radio and the Jerusalem Symphony Orchestra (2009), First Prize at the Fort Worth International Young Pianists Competition (USA, 2008), First Prize at the Michelstadt Competition (Germany, 2008), The Best Israeli Competitor Prize at the Rubinstein International Piano Competition, The Pnina Zaltsman Award at the Tel Hai International Master Classes (2010), as well as Third Prize, Audience Favorite Prize, and an award for best performance of a 21st-century piece at the Serbia International Piano Competition Isidor Bajic (2006).

Berenika Glixman is a founding member of the Multipiano Ensemble, with which she extensively toured the Americas, Europe, the Far East and Israel. Together with other members of the ensemble she won the Israeli Minister of Culture Award for "the best Israeli chamber ensemble" in 2015.
