= Umi Garrett =

American classical pianist

- Born: August 15, 2000 (age 26); California, U.S.
- Origin: American–Japanese
- Genre: Classical music
- Occupation: Classical Pianist
- Instrument: Piano
- Years active: 2009–present
- Label: Arizona University Records

Umi Garrett (born August 15, 2000) is an American classical pianist.

== Early career ==
Garrett began playing the piano at the age of four years. She began serious study of the piano under the instruction of Itoe Akimoto and Yoshie Akimoto. Currently, Garrett studies with John Perry. She has been invited to perform at the Killington Music Festival in Vermont as the youngest performer in the 26-year history of the festival. Garrett attended the Sydney International Piano Masterclass Festival in 2012. She also plays the violin and has taken ballet since she was two and a half.

== Career ==
In August 2009 Garrett performed in several concerts at the Vianden Music Festival in Luxembourg, and Germany in selected solo and chamber music works. In 2010, Umi won the Second International Chopin Competition in Hartford, Connecticut with a perfect score from all three judges, and was subsequently invited to perform at Carnegie Hall. Also in 2010, Garrett had an appearance with Keith Lockhart and the Boston Pops sponsored by NPR's From The Top, and her orchestral debut with the Desert Symphony in Palm Desert, California in December 2009, performing Mozart's Piano Concerto No. 23 in A major. Garrett made her China debut with the Wuhan Symphony Orchestra in 2010 at the age of nine at Wuhan. She also was a recipient of the MusicFest Perugia Scholarship.

In 2011 Garrett performed at the Assisi nel Mondo Festival. Garrett has performed with the Charlotte Symphony in Florida, Thayer Symphony in Massachusetts, Saddleback Symphony in California, Indiana Chamber Orchestra in Indianapolis, and the Missouri Symphony in Columbia. In March 2012 Umi Garrett performed at The International Piano Stars Festival in Latvia being the youngest performer in the festival's history. This year she performed again at the Assisi nel Mondo Festival.

Umi Garrett created a special concert series called "Kizuna Concert Series" to visit people in Tohoku, Japan, where the tsunami happened in 2011. She had four concerts in Tohoku in March 2013. In 2015 Garrett was invited to perform with the Hiroshima Symphony Orchestra in a performance show that was planned to commemorate the 70th anniversary of the peace treaty that was signed by the United States and Japan.

In March 2020, Garrett won the Fourth Prize at the US National Chopin Piano Competition in Miami, Florida, ex aequo with fellow American pianist and Juilliard colleague, Chelsea Guo. Since September 2018, Garrett has been a student in the Juilliard-Columbia dual program, studying with Matti Raekallio and Hung Kuan Chen

== Awards ==
Year	Award	Location	Result
2008	Southwestern Youth Music Festival	Los Angeles	First prize
2008	J.S. Bach Competition	Los Angeles	First prize
2009	J.S. Bach Competition	Los Angeles	First prize
2009	Saddleback Symphony Concerto Competition	Mission Viejo, CA	First prize
2011	Chopin International Competition	Hartford, CT	Grand Prix
2011	Schubert Club, Liszt Competition	CT	First prize
2012	Bradshaw & Buono International Piano Competition	New York City	First prize
2012	The International Chopin Competition "Chopin Plus"	Budapest, Hungary	First prize
2012	The Osaka International Chamber Music Competition	Osaka, Japan	First prize
