= Liana Forest =

Liana Forest is a Soviet-born classical pianist and recording artist. She lives in the United States and performs in concerts.

== Biography ==
Born in Odessa, Liana began her music training at the age of three with her father, a tenor at the Odessa Opera. Liana grew up a student of Ludmila Ginsburg, herself a graduate from Moscow Conservatoire under the tutelage of professor Heinrich Neuhaus (Richter and Gilels were among his other pupils). A Bösendorfer artist, she was a featured soloist at the Midsummer Mozart Festival and toured nationwide under the auspices of Columbia Artists Management. She performed in recitals in the US, Africa, Europe and Asia and appeared on National European Television. To date, Liana has recorded three CDs: Romantic Piano, Piano Serenade and Christmas Elegance.
