= Milica Pap =

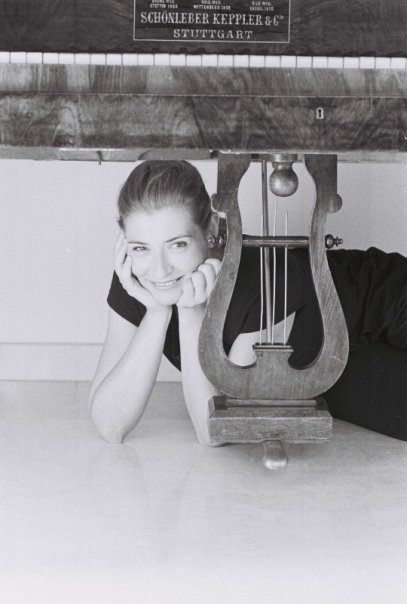
- Milica Pap in 2006

Background information
- Born: Milica Pap; December 14, 1973 (age 52); Sarajevo, Yugoslavia
- Genres: Classical
- Occupation: musician
- Instrument: Piano
- Years active: 1985–present
- Website: www.milicapap.com

Milica Pap (born December 14, 1973, in Sarajevo, Yugoslavia) is a classical pianist of Bosnian-Herzegovinian, Serbian and Croatian descent.

== Biography ==
Pap is a Balkan pianist and music teacher.

Her father Ljudevit Pap (or Lajos Papp to use the Hungarian spelling) was a violinist and professor of music at the University of Belgrade. He was a founding member of the Association of Serbian Musicians and the first violinist and leader of the Belgrade Symphony Orchestra and the Sarajevo Radio Orchestra. He is also credited with forming the first professional string quartet in Sarajevo. He died when Pap was 14.

Her mother is the Serbian-Montenegrin pianist Angelina Bojovic, who still teaches at the Music Academy in Sarajevo. Her pupils include the pianists M. Karacic (US), B. Hrovat (Canada), M. Olenjuk (Germany) and S. Kulenovic (Slovenia).

By the age of 10, Pap could play. She gave her first public recital at the age of 14. The Bosnian-Herzegovinian authorities awarded her a scholarship to the faculty of music at Belgrade University in 1991, when she came first in the entrance exams at the age of 17. While there, she won the Olga Mihajlovic Prize for best pianist in the university and the Radmila Djordjevic Prize for best piano accompanist.

Pap studied under A.Valdma, N. LJ. Starkman, S. Bogino, V. Ogarkov, S. Dorensky, L. Istvan, I. Khudolei, Y. Kot, I. Alekseyhuk, R. Kehrer, D. Anderson, P. Scheyder, L. Pogorelich and D. Protopopescu. This led to her being given a teaching post at the university at the age of 21; in 1997, she became a professor of music there, specialising in piano, chamber music and accompaniment. By 2000, she also held a professorship at the Sarajevo Music Academy.

The major Russian piano composers feature strongly in her performing repertoire, especially Mussorgsky, Scriabin, Rachmaninov and Prokofiev. At the meeting of the EPTA (European Piano Teachers Association) in 2003, she was invited to play Rachmaninov's second concerto with the Belgrade Symphony Orchestra. This led to a scholarship offer at the Luxembourg Conservatoire for one year which she took up and during which she was awarded the Victor Fenigstein prize for outstanding talent. She graduated there with a Diplôme Supérieur de Piano studying under professor S. Bausch and gained first prize for harmony, counterpoint, fugue and composition under professor A. Mullenbach.

By this time, Pap was playing in several European countries: Croatia, Serbia, Montenegro, Slovenia, Macedonia, Hungary, Luxembourg and Bosnia-Herzegovina. In most of these, she was invited to play at music festivals. Her mastery of accompaniment also led her to be invited to join the Sarajevo Opera as a voice and lyric coach, in which role she helped in productions of Die Fledermaus, Rigoletto, and La Bohème as well as some Slavonic operas.

Later, Pap served as head of the piano department at the Sarajevo Music Academy (2005/06) and was given a visiting professorship at Sarajevo University in 2006. She accepted in 2007 to be in charge of European reform of education in her university (Bologna Process).

Since September 2008, she has lived in France sharing her time between Nantes and Paris. In the former city, she has worked as a teacher and vocal accompanist while also giving recitals. In Paris, her work has centred round her ambition to study the work and set up of the world-famous Paris Conservatoire with the hope of one day establishing a similar institution in Sarajevo. However, like many Yugoslavians born before the Balkan conflicts of the last decade, her career has been hampered by war. For the four years she was in Belgrade, she never set eyes on her mother. During that time, she was basically a stateless person with no passport who could not travel anywhere.
