= Jadwiga Szajna-Lewandowska =

Polish pianist and educator

Jadwiga Szajna-Lewandowska (22 February 1912 – 14 March 1994) was a Polish pianist, music educator and composer.

== Biography ==
Jadwiga Szajna-Lewandowska was born in Brody, Austria-Hungary and studied piano with Marii Sołtysowej at the Conservatory of Music in Lwów, graduating in 1931. She continued her studies in composition with Tadeusz Szeligowski, Piotr Perkowski and Stefan Boleslaw Poradowski at the National Academy of Music in Wrocław, graduating in 1956. After completing her studies, she worked as a music educator, teaching accompaniment, chamber ensemble, music theory and composition. She died in Wrocław.

== Honors and awards ==
- Opolska Wiosna Competition, second prize for the cantata Regiment (1960)
- Opolska Wiosna Competition, second prize for the song cycle I envy the nut for soprano and chamber orchestra (1962)
- Competition for composers in Mannheim, award for children's ballet Ein Spaziergang in der Stadt (1971)
- National Composition Competition, second prize for We Play in the Green (1970)
- Prize of the city of Wrocław (1964)
- Prime Minister's Award (1974 and 1983)

== Works ==
Jadwiga Szajna-Lewandowska composed mostly works for youth, including ballets and stage works. She also composed for instruments, voice, and choral ensemble. Selected works include:

- Sonatina for Oboe and Piano (1953–54)
- Concertino for flute and strings (1954–56)
- Mythological Preludes for flute and piano (1955)
- Pinocchio, a ballet for children (1956)
- Giocosa Sonatina for piano (1958–59)
- Two Studies for violin and piano (1960)
- Regiment, a cantata for mixed chorus and small orchestra (1960)
- Capriccio for clarinet and strings free education (1960)
- Sonatina for Flute and Piano (1961)
- I envy the nut, a song cycle for soprano and chamber orchestra (1961)
- Two Studies for piano and string orchestra (1962)
- Harp, mimodrama (1962)
- Three Songs humorous for 2-voice choir, string quintet and percussion (1962–1964)
- About El Mole Rahmim for mixed choir, orchestra and narrator (1964)
- Ballade for violin and chamber orchestra (1964)
- Concertino for two pianos (1965)
- Kidnapping in Tiutiurlistan, a ballet for children (1965–1966)
- Tre legerezze for piano (1965)
- Ein Spaziergang in der Stadt, a ballet for children (1968)
- Mr. Lear's rhymes, the narrator and chamber orchestra (1968)
- Three pieces for piano and strings (1968)
- Thais, ballet (1969–70)
- Two songs of the Persian [version] for male choir a cappella (1969)
- Two songs of the Persian [version II] for baritone, flute, clarinet, harp, strings and percussion (1970)
- Funerailles [version] for two pianos (1970–72)
- Concerto for piano, string orchestra and percussion (1970)
- Six songs [version] for voice and piano for children (1970)
- Funerailles [version II] for string orchestra, piano and percussion (1971)
- Six songs [version II] for children's choir and piano (1971)
- Princess in oślej skin, the opera-musical children (1972–74)
- Twelve poems for solo soprano and string quartet (1972)
- Ten etudes for two pianos (1975)
- Blue Cat[version], musical fairy tale in 2 acts (1975)
- Blue Cat [version II], musical fairy tale in 3 acts with a prologue (1976)
- Poems for narrator and piano (1977)
- The Enchanted Tailor, a fantastic spectacle of historical (1978)
- Two Songs to texts Hanna Januszewska for 2-voice children's choir and piano (1978)
- All'Antico, free education for orchestra (1978)
- Five Pieces for piano quintet (1978)
- Six Pieces for piano and string quartet (1978)
- Six Pieces for violin and piano for young soloists and chamber musicians (1978–1980)
- The Myth of Alexander,"= [II version of the ballet "Thais"] (1979–80)
- The four dances in the old style for chamber ensemble of wind instruments and percussion (1979)
- Concerto for Piano and Orchestra for students of music school second degree (1979)
- Six trioletów for 2 flutes and piano (1980)
- Six Etudes for two pianos for young soloists and chamber musicians (1982)
- Little Red Riding Hood, a ballet for the youngest (1984)
- Carnival Row for mezzo-soprano and orchestra (1985)
- Emperor's Nightingale, a ballet for children (1992)
- The Princess and the Pea, a ballet for children (1992)
