= Suzanne Joly =

French composer and pianist (1914–2012)

Suzanne Joly (16 March 1914 – 2012) was a French composer and pianist born in Oran.

A child prodigy, she performed in Algeria and France before studying piano under Lazare-Lévy and Antoinette Véluard, and composition under Olivier Messiaen and Jean Roger-Ducasse at the Conservatoire de Paris. Her real name was 'Suzanne Obadia', wife of painter Louis Joly, she wrote musical works covering all genres: Petite Suite for orchestra (1942) Sérénade; Fantaisie concertante for piano and orchestra (1944–1948) Rupestre pour orchestre (1968) Mélodies (Paul Verlaine, Andrée Brunin,...); Ode à la Jeune Fille (1968); String quartet; Thème, Variations et Allegro Fugato for solo piano (1956) etc.

Died in Paris in 2012, she was buried at Cimetière parisien de Bagneux.

A large portion of her archives is housed at the Centre International Albert Roussel.
