= Adele Lewing =

German pianist and composer (1866–1943)

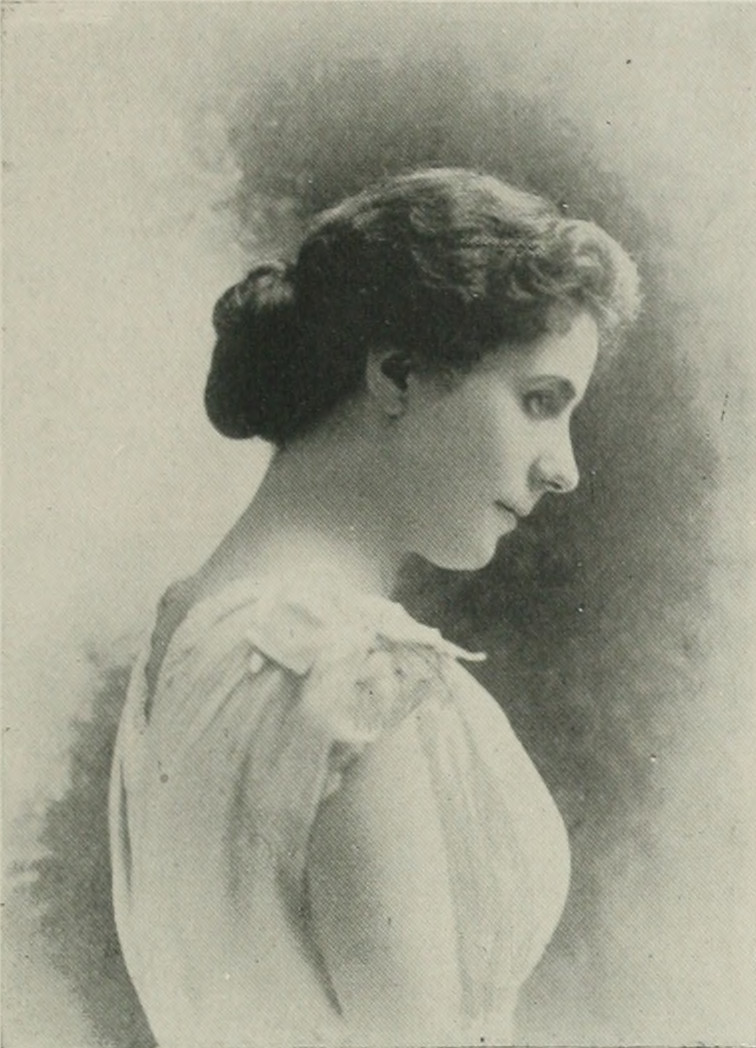
- Born: 6 August 1866; Hanover, Germany
- Died: 16 February 1943 (aged 74); New York City
- Occupations: Pianist; Composer

Adele Lewing (6 August 1866 – 16 February 1943) was a German pianist and composer.

== Early years and education ==
Lewing was born in Hanover in 1866. She was educated in classical music by her grandfather, A. C. Prell, the principal cellist in the Niedersächsisches Staatsorchester Hannover, a pupil of Bernhard Romberg; and in piano by Johannes Moeller, a pupil of Ignaz Moscheles. At the age of 14, she made her first public appearance. Later, she became the student of Carl Reinecke and Salomon Jadassohn at the Leipzig conservatory, studying also harmony with the latter. Reinecke selected Lewing to play Mendelssohn's first Cello Sonata in the Mendelssohn celebration, and she was also chosen to play the F minor suite by Handel in a concert in honor of the King of Saxony. On 30 April 1884 Lewing played Beethoven's concerto in G major, on her first appearance in the public examination in the Leipzig Gewandhaus. Reinecke selected Lewing to play his quintet, Op. 82, in another concert on 10 May 1884. In her last public examination concert, she played Beethoven's concerto in E-flat major, and graduated from the Leipzig Royal Conservatory "with high honours".

Lewing continued her studies in Vienna, the piano with Theodor Leschetizky, and composition with Robert Fuchs. She composed piano music and Lieder.

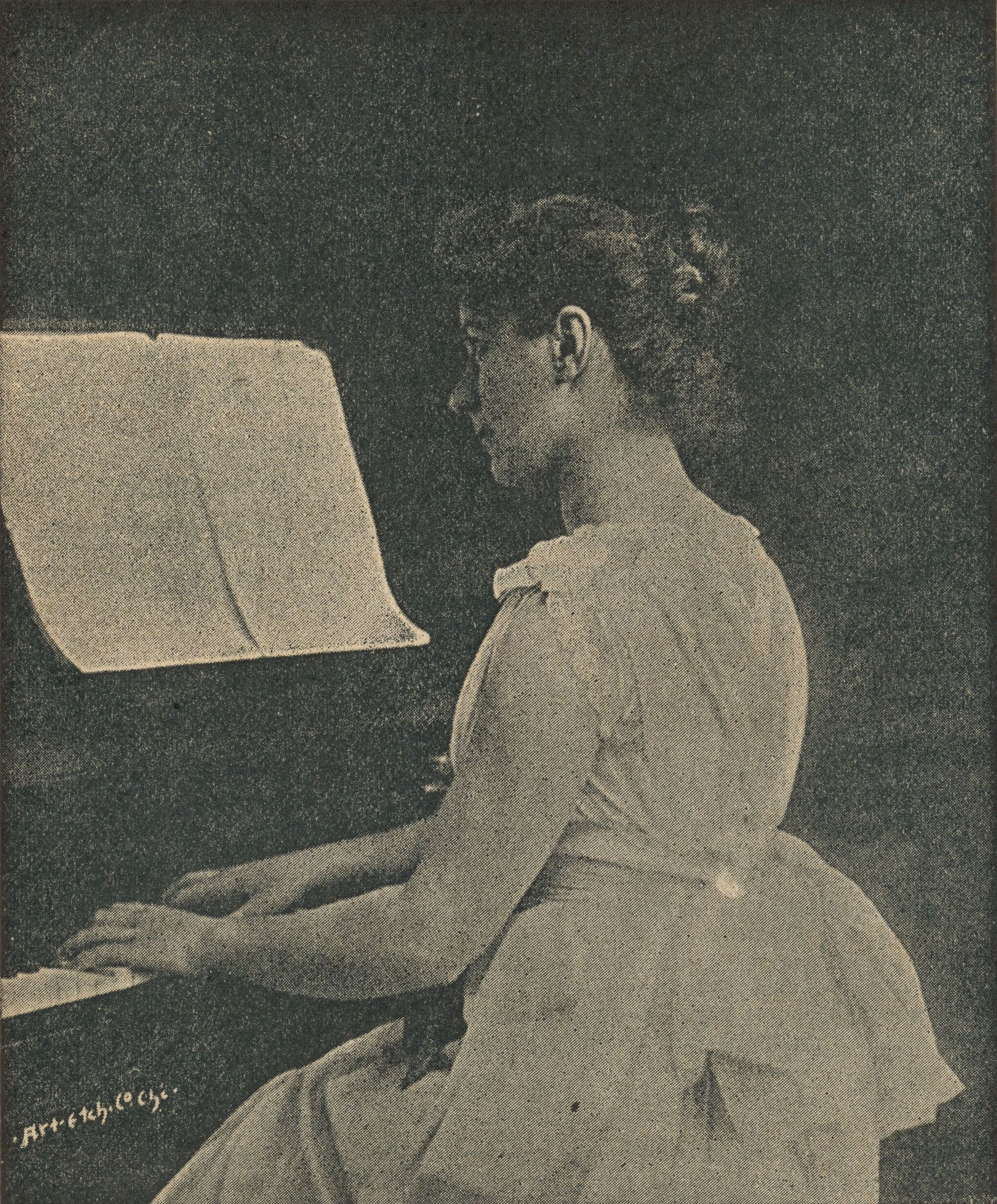
Program from Nye and Riley performance

== Career ==
She came unheralded to America, formed a class of piano pupils in Chicago, and gave her first public concert in that city on 7 December 1888 in the Weber Music Hall. She played before the Artists' Club, in the Haymarket concerts and numerous others. On 27 June 1889, she played before the Indiana State Music Teachers' Association. On 5 July 1889, she played in the 13th meeting of the Music Teachers' National Association, in Philadelphia, and in August of the same year, she gave a series of piano recitals in the Elberon Casino in New Jersey. Her concert tour to Boston, Philadelphia, St. Louis and other cities took place in the early part of May 1890. Lewing was a composer as well, and in her youth, she wrote poetry. Lewing continued performing on the radio throughout the 1920s and into the early 1930s.

== Personal life ==
In 1900 in Harlem, Lewing married Benjamin W. Stiefel, a professor at the College of Physicians and Surgeons. She and Stiefel had met when she was a student at the Leipzig Conservatory 15 years previously. They had one child, a daughter in 1904.

Stiefel died 16 February 1943 in New York City.

== Selected works ==
=== Piano ===
- Berceuse
- Children in the Forest
- Children's March
- Greeting
- Legend
- Meditations
- Old French Dance
- Romance, Op. 17
- Song without words, Op. 16

=== Vocal ===
- By the Rhine
- Evening Rest
- Fair Rohtraut
- Faithfulness
- Legende, Op. 15
- Liebeslied, Op. 14
- Love Song
- Proposal
- Springtime
- Wanderer's Night Song
- Winter Night
