= Stephanie Wurmbrand-Stuppach =

Hungarian pianist and composer (1849–1919)

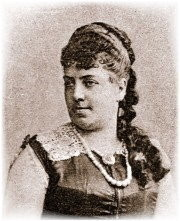
Countess Stephanie von Wurmbrand-Stuppach

Countess Stephanie von Wurmbrand-Stuppach (December 26, 1849 – February 16, 1919) was a Hungarian pianist and composer. She was also known as Stephanie Brand-Vrabely.

== Biography ==
Stephanie von Wurmbrand-Stuppach was born in Pressburg (now Bratislava), Hungary. Her father, Karl von Vrabély, was a director of the Royal Hungarian Mail. Her mother, Seraphine Edle von Szlemenics, was a Doctor of Laws, the daughter of the Privy Councillor Professor Paul von Szlemenics. Stephanie showed early musical talent and received piano lessons. She released her first song composition at age 14, and later released a collection of thirty songs under the pseudonym Stephanie Brand-Vrabely. She gave concerts in Vienna and other major cities in Europe.

On July 6, 1869, she married Count Ernst von Wurmbrand-Stuppach, brother of Adelma Vay. She worked as a writer, publishing in the feuilleton supplements of various newspapers. In recognition of her achievements she received a Silver Medal for Art and Science from Ernest II, Duke of Saxe-Coburg and Gotha.

== Works ==
Selected works include:

Piano Works:

- Three Character Pieces (Opus 8)
- Fifteen little fantasy pieces (Opus 24)
- Five Piano Pieces (Opus 25)
- Dance scenes (Opus 27)
- Two dances (Opus 29)
- Two Noveletten (Opus 31)
- La Gracieuse (Opus 32)
- The beautiful Mesuline (Opus 33)
- Three Piano Pieces (Opus 34)
- Seven Piano Pieces (Opus 37)
- Five Piano Pieces (Opus 38)
- From the mountains (Opus 39)
- Paraphrase on Two Hungarian Folk Songs (Opus 40)
- Concert-Para phase (Opus 41)
- Ocean (Opus 43)
- Conzert Etude (Opus 44)
- Kliczków (Opus 45)
- Six Piano Pieces (Opus 46)
- Three Piano Pieces (Opus 50)
- Aeolian Harp (Opus 52)
- Piano study for the left hand (Opus 53)
- Seven Piano Pieces (Opus 54)
- Barcarolle (Opus 55)
- Eleven piano pieces (Opus 61)
- Elf at the spinning wheel (Opus 63)
- Night Music on Kieferstadtel (Opus 64)
- Three Piano Pieces
- Three Piano Pieces
- Three Piano Pieces
- Three Piano Pieces
- Character piece
- Four Piano Pieces
- Ivy-leaf
- Eight Piano Pieces
- Ten Pieces for Piano

Piano Sonata:

- Sonata (Opus 35)

Elegy:

- Auf der Glatzen (Opus 51)

Anthem:

- Kaiserin Elisabeth-Hymne

Concert pieces:

- Concert pieces in Hungarian style (Opus 26)
- Concert Piece (Opus 57)

Songs:

- Der Wald ist kühl (Opus 1)
- Vier Lieder (Opus 28)
- Romanze (Opus 30)
- Nur ein Herz sei mein eigen (Opus 61)
- Wiegenliedchen
- Ich hab’ im Traum geweinet

March:

- Graf Wilczel

Quintet:

- My day has three hours (Opus 23)

Dances:

- Waltz (Opus 36)
- Waltz (Opus 42)
- Steffi-Walzer (Opus 62)
- Waltz
- Waltz

Violin Sonata:

- Sonata
