= Anna Stella Schic =

Brazilian pianist (1922–2009)

- Born: June 30, 1922; Campinas, Brazil
- Died: February 1, 2009 (aged 86) Nice, France
- Genres: Classical
- Occupations: Pianist, Author
- Instrument: Piano

Anna Stella Schic (30 June 1922 in Campinas – 1 February 2009 in Nice) was a Brazilian pianist and author of a biography of composer Heitor Villa-Lobos.

== Life ==
Schic gave her first piano recital at the age of six. She was taught by José Kliass, a former student of Martin Krause, who was in turn trained by Franz Liszt. Later on, she studied with Marguerite Long in Paris. Schic was married to French composer Michel Philippot, and according to her daughter Sandra Lechartre, she lived in France from 1971 on.

In addition to her career as pianist, she taught at the Universidade Estadual Paulista Júlio de Mesquita Filho and the Universidade Federal do Rio de Janeiro.

== Legacy ==
In 1976, Schic released her recorded cycle of the complete solo piano music of Heitor Villa-Lobos, the first such cycle to be completed. In addition, she was among the first to promote the music of Pierre Boulez in Brazil, and she also recorded works by George Gershwin, Felix Mendelssohn, and her husband. Her book Villa-Lobos: Souvenirs de l’Indien blanc was published in 1987.
