= Cathy Krier =

Luxembourgish pianist

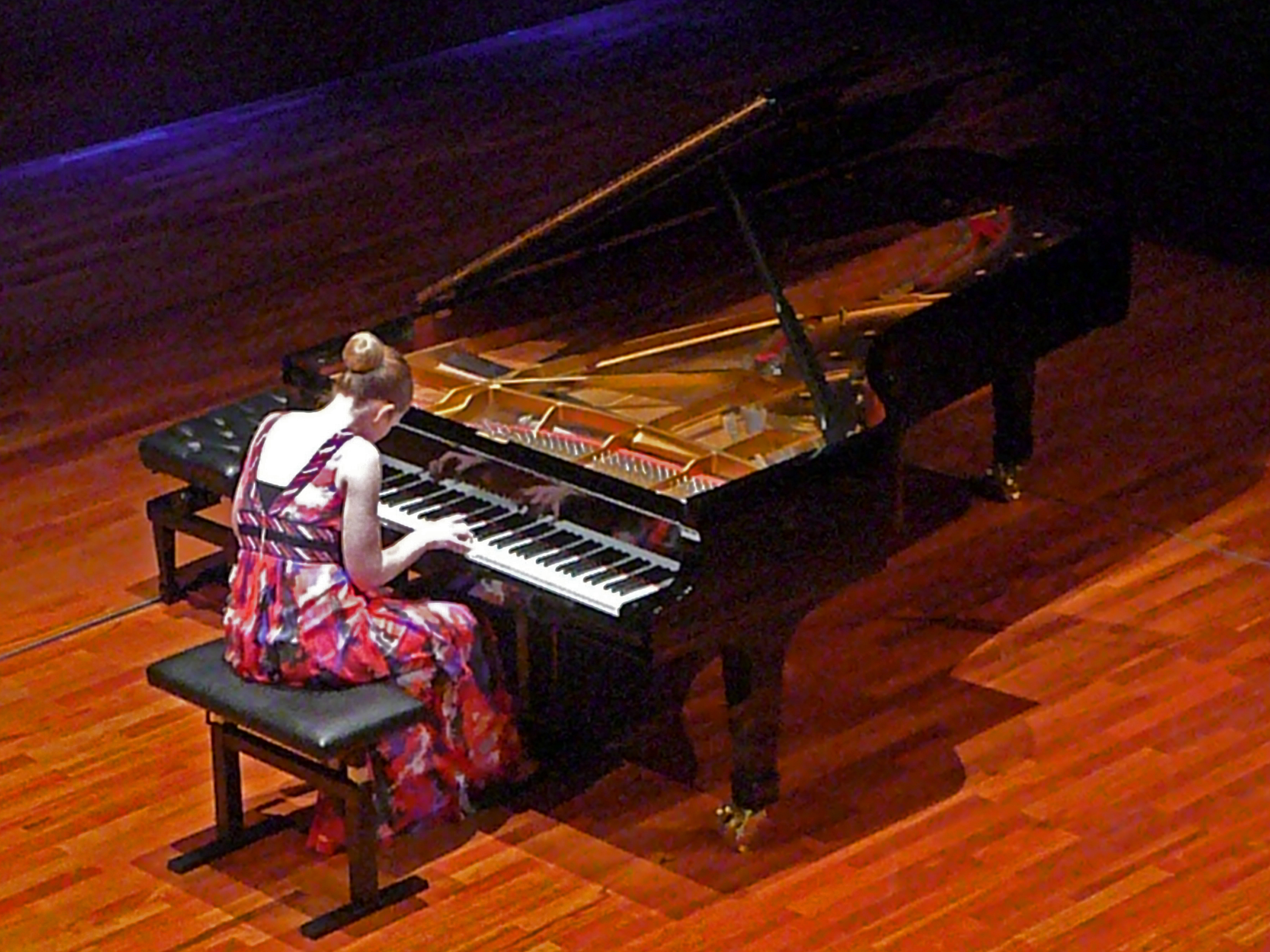
Cathy Krier - Dudelange - 27-02-2010

Cathy Krier is a pianist from Luxembourg. She has embarked on an international career, performing mainly in Europe (France, Germany, Italy, Austria, Spain and Luxembourg), the United States and China.

== Early life ==
Krier was born in Luxembourg City. A daughter of musicians, she started playing the violin when she was only three years old. She started playing the piano at age five in the Conservatoire de Luxembourg. She has received guidance from Pavel Gililov, Robert D. Levin, Dominique Merlet, Homero Francesch and Andrea Lucchesini. She has studied at Académie musicale de Villecroze, Scuola di Musica di Fiesole and Hochschule für Musik und Tanz.

== Performances ==
Ms. Krier has performed at the opening Ceremony of Luxembourg European Capital of Culture, the inauguration of the Luxembourg Philharmonie concert hall and many festivals and venues around Europe and the United States (including the Ruhr Piano Festival, Echternach International, Musek am Syrdall Festival). She has played in venues such as the Kennedy Center Millennium Stage, Washington, D.C. and Rolduc Abbey in the Netherlands among many others. She has performed with various orchestras and ensembles, including the Luxembourg Philharmonic Orchestra, the European Soloists of Luxembourg and the Latvian Philharmonic Chamber Orchestra. Conductors she has worked with include Jack Martin Händler, Garry Walker, Bramwell Tovey, Yoon K. Lee and Pierre Cao.

== Awards ==
In 2003, she was awarded the Prix Norbert Stelmes by the Jeunesses Musicales du Luxembourg. The following year she received the IKB International Foundation Prize.

In May 2014, it was announced that Krier had become one of the European Concert Hall Organisation's "Rising Stars", providing her with opportunities to perform in the organisation's network of 21 concert halls.

== Recordings ==
Since her debut effort, "Recital" (2009, Avi Music), she has released recordings of works by Debussy, Liszt, Ligeti, Schonberg and Janáček, among others.
