= Saori Sarina Ohno =

Japanese-born German-American pianist

Saori Sarina Ohno (born in Tokyo, Japan) is a pianist who was raised in Germany and has studied in Germany and the United States.

== Education ==
Ohno began playing the piano at the age of four. At sixteen, she entered the Staatliche Hochschule für Musik und Darstellende Kunst in Stuttgart, Germany, as a student of Lieselotte Gierth and Gerd Lohmeyer. After receiving her master's degree, she continued her studies from 1992 to 1994 at the Indiana University School of Music where she received an Artist Diploma as a student of Menahem Pressler. She also obtained a Graduate Chamber Music Diploma from the University of Wisconsin–Milwaukee. In 2005, she received her doctoral degree from the Graduate Center of the City University of New York. Her doctoral dissertation was titled "The Piano Chamber Music of Maurice Ravel." Additionally, she studied with Rita Sloan, Joseph Kalichstein among others.

== Awards ==
Ohno was the winner of the German National Youth Competition Jugend musiziert in 1986, the 1992 E. Nakamichi Piano Competition in Aspen, the 1994 Indiana University Piano Competition and won top prizes at the prestigious Fischoff and Coleman Chamber Music Competitions.

== Style ==
Ohno concertizes extensively as a soloist, recitalist and chamber musician in Europe, the United States, Japan and Taiwan.

She is on the faculty of Shobi University, Shobi Music College and J. F. Oberlin University In 2010, she released her first CD of piano music by Maurice Ravel (WWCC-7662). Her second CD features piano compositions by Robert Schumann. Both albums received critical acclaim and were awarded a "Special Selection" by Recording Arts Magazine (レコード芸術 特選盤). Her third album features the last 2 Sonatas by Franz Schubert.
