= Elizabeth Joanetta Catherine von Hagen =

Dutch classical composer

Elizabeth Joanetta Catherine von (van) Hagen (1750–1809) was a Dutch pianist, music educator and composer who lived and worked in the United States.

== Biography ==
She was born in Amsterdam and married Rotterdam composer, violinist and organist Peter Albrecht von Hagen. In 1774 the couple emigrated to Charleston, South Carolina, and had a son, Peter Albrecht von Hagen, Jr., in about 1780, followed by a daughter and another son. They moved to New York City and to Boston in 1796 where they worked as music teachers, composers, music publishers, performers and concert managers. Elizabeth von Hagen died in Suffolk County, Massachusetts.

== Works ==
Von Hagen composed works for piano and was known as a composer and arranger of theatrical music. Clear attribution of works within the Peter Albrecht von Hagen family has not been possible.
