= Carla Sandoval =

Chilean pianist of classical repertoire (born 1982)

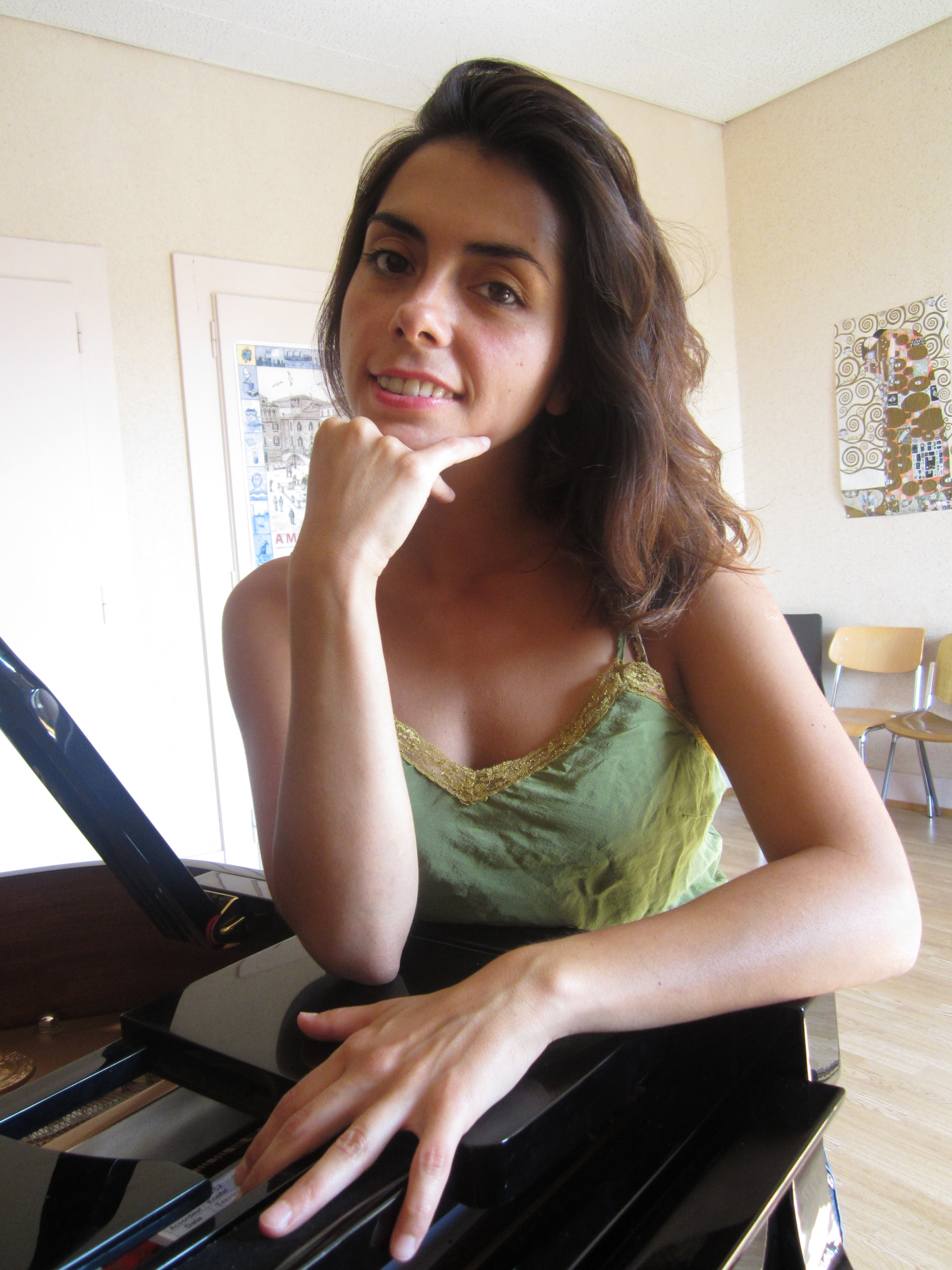
Carla Sandoval

Carla Sandoval (born 1982, Valdivia, Chile) is a Chilean pianist of classical repertoire.

Sandoval began playing the piano from a young age. She earned the academic degree Interprete superior de Piano con distinción máxima (Superior piano performer with highest honors) in the music institute of the Pontifical Catholic University of Chile. She later earned a Master of Arts in Music Performance, Piano in the Geneva University of Music with Elisabeth Athanassova. Then, she earned in the same establishment a Master of Arts HES-SO in musical pedagogy, with piano as major discipline. She studied under the pianist Nelson Goerner between the years 2009–2011.

She has given recitals in various countries like Chile, Switzerland, Spain, France and Germany and teaches the piano at the Conservatoire de Musique de Genève since 2007.

She was finalist in the 2007 Contest "Virtuoses du Futur" in Crans Montana, Switzerland. She also ventured into contemporary music composers premiering Chilean and European participation in the Festival of Contemporary Music in Santiago de Chile and the Contemporary Music Ensemble of the Haute Ecole de Musique de Genève.

She is currently performing in solo recital and chamber music.

== Awards ==
- First place and best performance of the joint work, "Claudio Arrau" Quilpué, Chile (1991) International Competition
- Second Place "Santa Cecilia", Chillan, Chile. (1992)
- First place, Category duo sonata, First Chamber Music Competition in Valdivia, Chile (2003).

== Sources ==
- Daniel Navarrete Alvear. Carla Sandoval. A promise fulfilled. El Diario Austral de Valdivia. pp. 16–17. Saturday December 25, 2010.
