= Indigenous music =

Music of indigenous ethnic groups

Indigenous music is a term for the traditional music of the indigenous peoples of the world, that is, the music of an "original" ethnic group that inhabits any geographic region alongside more recent immigrants who may be greater in number. The term therefore depends upon the political role an ethnic group plays rather than upon its strictly musical characteristics, for all further criteria (territory, race, history, subsistence lifestyle, etc.) defining indigenous peoples can also be applied to majority cultures.

Societies defined as, or defining themselves as, "indigenous" are found in every inhabited climate zone and continent of the world. Some important articles are:

- Music of Africa, especially the non-European, Asian or Arab-derived traditions
- Māori music of New Zealand
- Music of the Aborigines and Torres Strait Islanders of Australia
- Music of the indigenous peoples of Latin America and the Caribbean
- Native American music of the United States and Inuit, Métis and First Nation music of Canada
- Sámi music of Norway, Sweden, Finland, and Russia
- Music of South India
- Music of the republics of Russia
