= Olga Mihajlović =

Serbian pianist

Olga Mihajlović was a Serbian pianist and Professor of Piano at the Belgrade Music Academy.

== Teaching career ==
She had taught at the Belgrade Music Academy (later named Faculty of Music in Belgrade) from 1939 to 1978.
