= 2006 Valencia International Piano Competition Prize Iturbi =

Piano competition

XV Jose Iturbi International Piano Competition took place in Valencia, from September 14 to the 30th, 2006. The competition is held every two years and is a member of the Geneva World Federation of International Music Competitions. Pianist Josu De Solaun Soto was given the First Grand Prize, becoming the first Spanish pianist to be awarded such distinction in the 25 years of the competition's existence. The prize included over $25,000, recital and orchestral engagements and a recording contract.

== Jury ==
  - Joaquín Soriano (president)
  - Sulamita Aronovsky
  - Sergei Dorensky
  - Miguel Ángel Herranz
  - Jaime Ingram
  - Mi Kyung Kim
  - Natalie Michailidou
  - Fernando Puchol
  - Leslie Wright (substituting Jean-Bernard Pommier)
  - Oxana Yablonskaya

== Prizes ==
First Grand Prize	(Spain) Josu de Solaun	
Second Prize	(Russia) Valentina Igoshina	
Third Prize	(Russia) Andrei Yaroshinsky	
Fourth Prize	(France) Patrick Hemmerle	(Armenia) Sofya Melikyan
Fifth Prize	(Russia) Natalya Kuchaeva	
Sixth Prize	Void	
Best Valencian pianist	(Spain) Josu de Solaun	
Best Spanish pianist	(Spain) Josu de Solaun	
Best interpreter of Spanish music	(France) Patrick Hemmerle	(Armenia) Sofya Melikyan
Best interpreter of Spanish contemporary music	(Spain) Miguel Ángel Castro	(Russia) Philipp Kopachevsky
Best interpreter of a Beethoven concerto	(France) Patrick Hemmerle	
Best interpreter of a Chopin piece	(France) Patrick Hemmerle	

== Compositions commissioned for the competition ==
  - Joan Cerveró - Verdi
  - Carlos Fontcuberta - Après tout [ Performance by Miguel Á. Castro ]
  - Voro García Fernández - Etoiles filantes

== Competition Results (by Rounds) ==
=== First round ===
(Japan) Yukiko Akagi	(United States) Orlando Alonso	(United Kingdom) Cathal Breslin	(Romania) Catalina Butcaru	(Spain) Claudio Carbó
(Spain) Miguel Ángel Castro	(Spain) Josu de Solaun	(Bulgaria) Dora Deliyska	(France) Geraldine Dutroncy	(Ukraine) Anna Fedorova
(Finland) Sonja Fräki	(Russia) Nikolai Gangnus	(Bulgaria) Irina Georgieva	(France) Patrick Hemmerle	(Belgium) Dagmar Hofman
(South Korea) Hong Kook-hee	(South Korea) Hyung Sue-woon	(Russia) Valentina Igoshina	(Japan) Kyoko Kashii	(Greece) Marianna Katerelou
(South Korea) Kim Ji-youn	(Russia) Philipp Kopachevsky	(Russia) Natalya Kuchaeva	(Japan) Fuyuka Kusa	(South Korea) Lee Yoo-soon
(China) Lin Weichi	(Republic of Ireland) Maria McGarry	(Armenia) Sofya Melikyan	(Spain) Katia Michel	(Italy) Salvatore Monzo
(Japan) Yukako Morikawa	(Russia) Eleonora Morozova	(Spain) Inocencio Negrín	(Greece) Theodosia Ntokou	(Italy) Vincenzo Oliva
(Spain) Antonio Ortiz	(Russia) Natalya Osenchakova	(Italy) Stefania Passamonte	(Belarus) Ekaterina Popova	(Australia) Cameron Roberts
(Russia) Pavel Shatskiy	(Russia) Anna Solivieva-Drubich	(Israel) Inesa Sinkevych	(Japan) Shun Tominaga	(China) Wu Xiaofeng
(Russia) Andrei Yaroshinsky	(South Korea) Yoon Eun-kyung	(Serbia) Bojana Zdravković	(Ukraine) Denis Zhdanov	

=== Second round ===
(Japan) Yukiko Akagi	(United Kingdom) Cathal Breslin	(Spain) Claudio Carbó	(Spain) Miguel Ángel Castro	(Spain) Josu de Solaun
(Ukraine) Anna Fedorova	(Russia) Nikolai Gangnus	(France) Patrick Hemmerle	(Russia) Valentina Igoshina	(Russia) Philipp Kopachevsky
(Russia) Natalya Kuchaeva	(Japan) Fuyuka Kusa	(China) Lin Weichi	(Armenia) Sofya Melikyan	(Japan) Yukako Morikawa
(Spain) Inocencio Negrín	(Italy) Vincenzo Oliva	(Spain) Antonio Ortiz	(Australia) Cameron Roberts	(Russia) Pavel Shatskiy
(China) Wu Xiaofeng	(Russia) Andrei Yaroshinsky	(Serbia) Bojana Zdravković	(Ukraine) Denis Zhdanov	

=== Third round ===
(Japan) Yukiko Akagi	(Spain) Claudio Carbó	(Spain) Miguel Ángel Castro	(Spain) Josu de Solaun	(France) Patrick Hemmerle
(Russia) Valentina Igoshina	(Russia) Philipp Kopachevsky	(Russia) Natalia Kuchaeva	(Armenia) Sofya Melikyan	(Japan) Yukiko Morikawa
(Spain) Antonio Ortiz	(Russia) Andrei Yaroshinsky			

=== Semifinals ===
(Spain) Josu de Solaun (Beethoven's 3rd)	(France) Patrick Hemmerle (Beethoven's 1st)	(Russia) Valentina Igoshina (Beethoven's 4th)
(Russia) Natalya Kuchaeva (Beethoven's 5th)	(Armenia) Sofya Melikyan (Beethoven's 3rd)	(Russia) Andrei Yaroshinsky (Beethoven's 3rd)
Accompaniment: Valencia Orchestra. Yaron Traub, conductor.

=== Final ===
(Spain) Josu de Solaun (Rachmaninov's 2nd)	(Russia) Valentina Igoshina (Tchaikovsky's 1st)	(Russia) Andrey Yaroshinsky (Rachmaninov's Rhapsody)
Accompaniment: Valencia Orchestra. Yaron Traub, conductor.
