= Samvel =

Samvel (Armenian: Սամվել) is an Armenian name. It is the Armenian equivalent of Samuel. It may refer to:

- Samvel Aleksanyan (born 1968), Armenian oligarch, politician and parliamentarian
- Samvel Alumyan (1941–1987), Soviet Armenian violinist
- Samvel Aslanyan (born 1986), Russian handball player
- Samvel Babayan (born 1965), leader of the Dashink political party in Artsakh
- Samvel Babayan (born 1971), Uzbek football coach of Armenian descent
- Samvel Balasanyan (born 1954), Armenian politician and parliamentarian
- Samvel Danielyan (born 1971), Armenian Russian wrestler
- Samvel Darbinyan (born 1952), Armenian football coach
- Samvel Gasparov (1938–2020), Soviet/Russian film director and short story writer
- Samvel Gasparyan, Armenian weightlifter
- Samvel Gezalian (born 1970), Armenian ice dancer
- Samvel Grigoryan (1907–1987), Soviet Armenian poet and translator
- Samvel Karapetian (1961–2020), Armenian historian, researcher, and architecture expert
- Samvel Karapetyan (born 1965), Armenian Russian billionaire
- Samvel Karapetyan (born 1962), Armenian general
- Samvel Kocharyants (1909–1993), Soviet Armenian nuclear scientist
- Samvel Manukyan (born 1974), Armenian wrestler
- Samvel Melkonyan (born 1984), Armenian football midfielder
- Samvel Mkrtchyan (1959–2014), Armenian writer
- Samvel Mnatsyan (1990–2019), Armenian Russian ice hockey player
- Samvel Nikoyan (born 1957), Armenian politician and parliamentarian
- Samvel Petrosyan (born 1954), Armenian football manager
- Samvel Sevada (born 1949), Armenian artist, photographer and poet
- Samvel Shoukourian (born 1950), computer scientist, academician of NAS RA
- Samvel Shahramanyan (born 1978), Armenian politician and 5th President of Artsakh
- Samvel Ter-Sahakyan (born 1993), Armenian chess Grandmaster
- Samvel Tumanyan (born 1949), Armenian politician
- Samvel Yervinyan (born 1966), Armenian musician and composer
- Samvel, an Armenian novel by the writer Raffi

== See also ==
- Samuel (name)
