= George Enescu International Competition =

Music competition in Bucharest, Romania

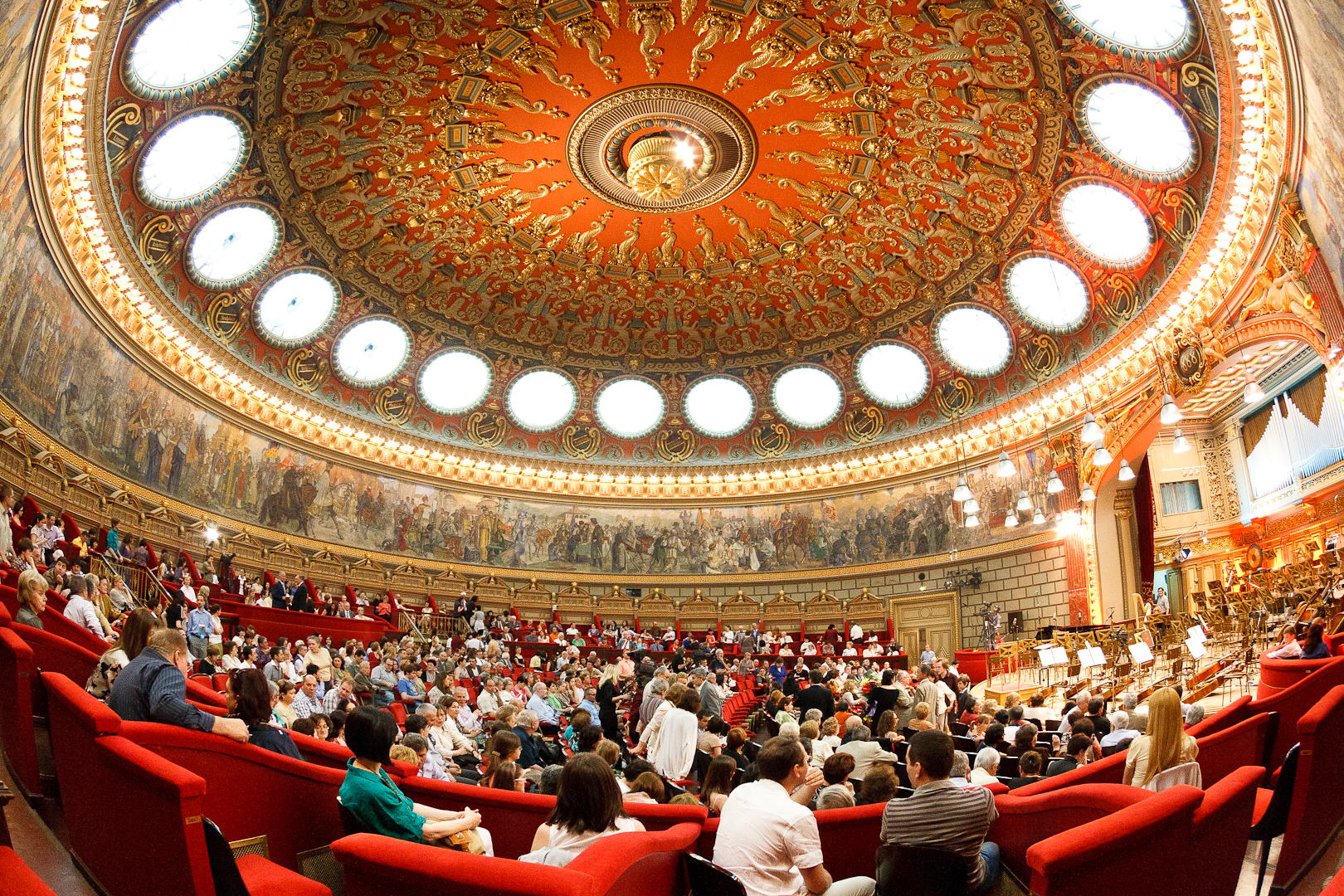
The Romanian Athenaeum in Bucharest, Romania, serves as one of the main venues in the George Enescu International Piano Competition.

The George Enescu International Competition is a music competition for young pianists, violinists, cellists and composers, that takes place in Bucharest, Romania. It has helped launch the careers of many musicians, and among its list of first-prize winners are pianists such as Radu Lupu, the winner in the 1967 edition. Other winners include Spanish pianist Josu De Solaun Soto, Russian pianists Elisabeth Leonskaja, in 1964, and Dmitri Alexeev, in 1970.

== Overview ==
The competition started in 1958, as part of the George Enescu Festival, and celebrated its first five editions (1958, 1961, 1964, 1967, and 1970) in what was then the Socialist Republic of Romania. It was considered, by the countries of the Eastern Bloc, one of the most prestigious music competitions. Jury members included famous musicians such as Claudio Arrau, Nadia Boulanger, Arthur Rubinstein, Magda Tagliaferro, Guido Agosti, Florica Musicescu, Dmitri Bashkirov, Carlo Zecchi, and Lazar Berman. Probably because of financial circumstances during Ceausescu's dictatorship, the competition was abandoned in 1970, though it resumed twenty-one years later.

The competition is a member of the World Federation of International Music Competitions in Geneva.

The competition and prize-giving ceremony has historically taken place in the Romanian Athenaeum, with the mayor always traditionally attending.

== Prize money ==
As of 2020 Cello, Violin and Piano prizes:

- First prize – €15.000
- Second prize – €10.000
- Third prize – €5.000

Composition prizes:

- Prize for symphonic music section – €10.000
- Chamber music section – €7.000
- Prize for originality – €5.000;

== Winners ==
=== Piano section ===
Top prize piano winners since the foundation of the competition in 1958
Year	1st	2nd	3rd
1958	(China) Ming-Qiang Li	(France) Michèle Boegner (Soviet Union) Mikhail Voskresensky (tie)	(Soviet Union) Dmitry Paperno
1961	Not awarded	(Israel) Arie Vardi (Romania) Théodore Paraskivesco (tie)	(China) Hong Teng
1964	(Soviet Union) Elisabeth Leonskaja	(France) André Gorog	(Romania) Gabriel Amiras
1967	(Romania) Radu Lupu (Soviet Union) Samvel Alumyan (tie)	(Romania) Dan Grigore	(Soviet Union) Anatol Ugorski
1970	(Soviet Union) Dmitri Alexeev	(United States) Mack McCray	(Romania) Radu Toescu
1991	(Romania) Daniel Goiți	(Romania) Viniciu Moroianu	(Romania) Luiza Borac
1999	Not awarded	Not awarded	Not awarded
2001	(Romania) Diana Ionescu	(Romania) Matei Varga	(Romania) Maria-Magdalena Pitu-Jokisch
2003	(Russia) Ilona Timchenko	Not awarded	(Romania) Razvan Dragnea (Russia) Evgeny Starodubtsev (tie)
2005	(Estonia) Irina Zahharenkova	(Russia) Evgeny Izotov	(France) Aimo Pagin
2007	(Russia) Eduard Kunz	(Russia) Evgeny Cherepanov	(United States) Christopher Falzone
2009	(Russia) Amir Tebenikhin	(Russia) Violetta Kachikian	(South Korea) Jongdo An
2011	Not awarded	(South Korea) Jeung-Beum Sohn	(Romania) Mihai Ritivoiu (Canada) Ilya Poletaev (tie)
2014	(Spain) Josu de Solaun Soto	(Russia) Ilya Rashkovsky	(Greece) Vassilis Varvaresos
2016	(Bulgaria) Victoria Vassilenko	(Japan) Takuma Ishii	(Chile) Danor Quinteros
2018	(Russia) Daria Parkhomenko	(Latvia) Daumants Liepins	(Russia) Alexander Panfilov
2020	(South Korea) Yeon-Min Park	(Romania) Adela Liculescu	(Poland) Marcin Wieczorek
2022	(Israel) Alexandra Segal	(Romania) George Todica	(Hong Kong) Chun Lam U
2024	(Ukraine) Roman Lopatynskyi	(Russia) Tatiana Dorokhova	(Russia) Evgeny Konnov
2026	(South Korea) Jeongwoo Lee	(China) Yiming Guo	(Taiwan) Pin-Hong Lin

=== Violin section ===
Top prize violin winners since the foundation of the competition in 1958
Year	1st	2nd	3rd
1958	(Romania) Ştefan Ruha (Soviet Union) Semen Snitkovski (tie)	(Romania) Varujan Cozighian	(Soviet Union) Evgheni Smirnov (United Kingdom) Ralph Holmes (Romania) Daniel Podlovski (tie)
1961	(Romania) Nina Beilina	(Romania) Daniel Podlovski	(Soviet Union) Igor Frolov
1964	(France) Claire Bernard	(Soviet Union) Alexander Melnicov	(Romania) Varujan Cozighian
1967	(Soviet Union) Zinovie Vinnikov	(Soviet Union) Bogodar Kotorovici	(Romania) Mariana Sârbu
1970	(Romania) Silvia Marcovici	(Soviet Union) Ruben Agaronian	(Soviet Union) Philippe Hirschhorn
1991	(Romania) Dan Claudiu Vornicelu	(Germany) Axel Strauss	(Romania) Bogdan Marius Zvorişteanu
1999	(Romania) Alexandru Tomescu	(Romania) George Cosmin Bănică (Romania) Remus Azoiţei (tie)	Not awarded
2001	(Socialist Federal Republic of Yugoslavia) Nemanja Radulovic	(Romania) George Cosmin Bănică	(Romania) Ştefan Horvath
2003	(Romania) Eugen Ţichindeleanu	(Romania) George Cosmin Bănică	(Israel) Nurit Stark (Russia) Saeys Frederieke (tie)
2005	(Ukraine) Valeriy Sokolov	(Hungary) Szalai Antal	(Romania) George Cosmin Bănică
2007	(Italy) Anna Tifu	(South Korea) Chun Harim	(Romania) Vald Stănculeasa
2009	(Poland) Jarosław Nadrzycki	(South Korea) Shin A-Rah	(Russia) Palitsyna Nadezda
2011	Not awarded	(Russia) Haik Kazazyan (Moldova) Alexandra Conunova (tie)	(Hungary) Szalai Antal
2014	(Romania) (Germany) Ştefan Tarara	(Russia) Feodor Rudin	(South Korea) Wonhee Bae
2016	(South Korea) Gyehee Kim	(South Korea) Donghyun Kim	(Kazakhstan) Erzhan Kulibaev
2018	Not awarded	(Italy) Vikram Sedona	(Italy) Giuseppe Gibboni
2020/21	(Romania) Valentine Şerban	(South Korea) Jaewon Wee	(Germany) Tassilo Probst
2022	(Romania) Maria Marica	(Romania) Ştefan Aprodul	(France) Gregorie Torossian
2024	(United States) (Japan) Mayumi Kanagawa	(South Korea) Hyeonjeong Lee	(Japan) Wakana Kimura
2026	(United States) Jayden King	(Italy) Francesco Papa	(South Korea) Eun Che Kim

=== Cello section ===
Top prize cello winners since 2011
Year	1st	2nd	3rd
2011	(China) Tian Bonian	(Romania) Valentin Răduțiu	(Israel) Michal Korman
2014	(South Korea) Eun-Sun Hong	(United States) Tony Rymer	(United States) Sarah Rommel
2016	(United States) Zlatomir Fung	(Russia) Anastasia Kobekina	(Spain) Mon Pue-Lee
2018	(Estonia) Marcel Johannes Kits	(China) Yibai Chen	(France) Stanislas Kim
2022	(South Korea) Jaemin Han	(Germany) Sebastian Fritsch	(Romania) Ştefan Cazacu
2022	(Luxembourg) Benjamin Kruithof	(Moldova) (Romania) Constantin Borodin	(Germany) Constantin Siepermann
2024	(Japan) Yo Kitamura	(Italy) Ettore Pagano	(United States) Haddon Kay
2026	(Switzerland) Samuel Niederhauser	(United States) Joshua Kováč	(South Korea) Sanghyeok Park

=== Composition ===
Composition prize winners for Symphonic and Chamber Music since 1991
Year	Symphonic Music	Chamber Music
1991	(Romania) Dan Dediu	(Italy) Massim Trotta (Australia) Michael Smetanin
2003	(Switzerland) Oliver Waespi	(Romania) Diana Rotaru (Romania) Vlad Maistorovici
2005	(Romania) Diana Rotaru (Switzerland) David Philip Hefti	(Moldova) Maria Ungueranu (South Korea) Kim Young-Guk
2007	(Japan) Sakai Kenji	(Hungary) Megyery Kristina
2009	(Hong Kong) Lam Lan-Chee	(China) Qian Shen-Ying
2011	(South Korea) Chang Eunho	(South Korea) Kwang-Ho Cho
2014	(Romania) Sebastian Androne	(Romania) Alexandru Murariu
2016	(China) Tian Tian	(Italy) Caterina Di Cecca
2018	(Romania) Alexandru Murariu	(South Korea) Jung Hoon Ham
2020/21	(New Zealand) Karlo Margetic	(South Korea) Young Jae Cho
2022	(South Korea) Shin Kim	(Italy) Leonardo Marino
2024	(Australia) Alexander Voltz	(Italy) Daniele Di Virgilio
2026	(China) Jinhan Xiao	(France) Adrien Sassier
