= Zeffman =

Zeffman is a surname. Notable people with the surname include:

- Henry Zeffman (fl. 2014), British journalist
- Oliver Zeffman (born 1992), British conductor
