= Four Pieces for Piano, Op. 119 (Brahms) =

1894 musical works by Johannes Brahms

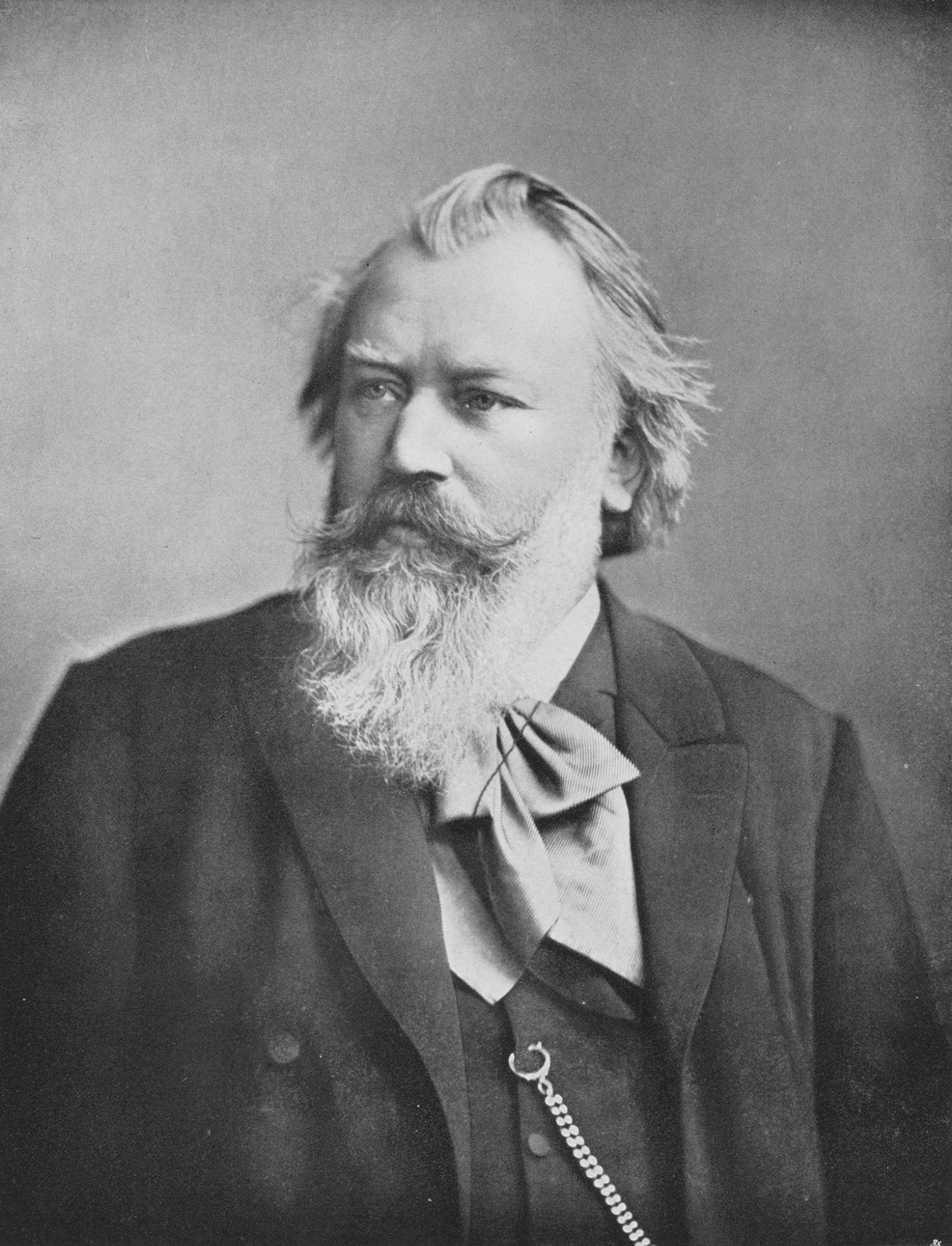
Portrait of Johannes Brahms in 1889

The Four Pieces for Piano (German: Klavierstücke) Op. 119, are four character pieces for piano composed by Johannes Brahms in 1893. The collection is the last composition for solo piano by Brahms. Together with the six pieces from Op. 118, Op. 119 was premiered in London in January 1894.

== Background ==
The Four Pieces for Piano were published in 1892 and 1893 along with three other collections of smaller piano pieces: Seven Fantasias Op. 116, Three Intermezzos Op. 117, and Six Pieces for Piano Op. 118.

Each of the first three pieces is called an intermezzo, and the last a rhapsody (the German spelling Rhapsodie is also common in English publications). The fact that Brahms originally intended the title ‘Capriccio’ for his earlier Rhapsody, Op. 79, No. 1, suggests that he used such terms rather loosely. ‘Intermezzo’ can be seen as an umbrella term under which Brahms could collect anything which he regarded as neither capricious nor passionate. He completed these pieces during his summer holiday in Bad Ischl, Upper Austria, in 1893, the first intermezzo being written in May and the following three pieces in June.

Since Brahms has combined these 20 character pieces in collections, he may have included some earlier compositions, and it is quite possible, although there is no definite proof, that some works—such as the E♭ major rhapsody—may have been conceived before 1892. Two earlier collections of smaller lyric piano pieces, Eight Pieces for Piano Op. 76, and Two Rhapsodies, Op. 79, date from 1871-79 (published 1879 and 1880 respectively).

== The pieces ==
=== 1. Intermezzo in B minor ===
The poetic mood of the first intermezzo from Op. 119 belies its vague title. In a letter from May 1893 to Clara Schumann, Brahms wrote:

I am tempted to copy out a small piano piece for you, because I would like to know how you agree with it. It is teeming with dissonances! These may [well] be correct and [can] be explained—but maybe they won’t please your palate, and now I wished, they would be less correct, but more appetizing and agreeable to your taste. The little piece is exceptionally melancholic and ‘to be played very slowly’ is not an understatement. Every bar and every note must sound like a ritard[ando], as if one wanted to suck melancholy out of each and every one, lustily and with pleasure out of these very dissonances! Good Lord, this description will [surely] awaken your desire!

Clara Schumann was enthusiastic and asked him to send the remaining pieces of his new work.

The words ‘melancholy’ and ‘with pleasure’ aptly describe the atmosphere evoked by the falling suspended arpeggios that open the piece. The middle section (bars 17–46) is in the relative key of D major, while the recapitulation returns to B minor.

=== 2. Intermezzo in E minor ===
The E minor intermezzo can be regarded as monothematic, although each recurrence of the theme is significantly transformed. The middle section and coda are in E major, the parallel major.

=== 3. Intermezzo in C major ===
No. 3, Intermezzo in C major
Recorded by Ossip Gabrilowitsch for the Welte-Mignon reproducing piano on July 4, 1905.

The length of the phrase is twelve bars, subdividing into two six-bar sections. The first six bars can certainly be heard as two three-bar units whereas the second six-bar section can rather be perceived as three times two bars. The second six-bar sub-phrase functions rhythmically as a giant hemiola.

This rhythmic gracefulness is opposed by the middle section of the piece. Two eight-bar phrases, subdividing into four-bar units, try to ‘correct’ the twelve-bar phrasing.

It is arguable that this piece is in binary form and the B section begins at bar 49 where new material appears.

=== 4. Rhapsody in E♭ major ===
Brahms's experiments with rhythm and phrase lengths are also apparent in the E♭ major rhapsody, which for 60 bars maintains five-bar phrases.

The grazioso second theme (starting bar 93) is constructed from eight-bar phrases that do not subdivide into four plus four, but into three plus two plus three.

The piece ends in E♭ minor, the parallel minor key to where it started (E♭ major). While it is not unusual to end a minor-key composition in the parallel major, it is much less common to find a piece ending in this manner. (See List of major/minor compositions.)
