= Ploiești Philharmonic Orchestra =

- Orchestra
- Founded: 1952
- Concert hall: Philharmonic "Paul Constantinescu"
- Website: www.filarmonicaploiesti.eu

The Ploiești Philharmonic Orchestra (Romanian: Filarmonica "Paul Constantinescu" Ploiești) is a Romanian orchestra based in Ploiești, Prahova County. The orchestra's home is the Paul Constantinescu Philharmonic, located in centre of Ploiești.

== History ==
The orchestra was founded in 1952. It was named after a well known composer, Paul Constantinescu.

=== Ploiești Philharmonic Orchestra today ===
Some of the names that had concerts in this hall: Igor Bezrodnii, Carlo Farina, Paavo Berglund, Renard Czajkovski, Michael Heize, Franco de Masi, Enzo Ferraris, Lee Sun Young, Maximino Zumalave, Daniil Safran, Li Ming Cean, Silvia Mercier, Viktor Eresko, Pavel Kogan, Ion Voicu, Stefan Ruha, Mihaela Martin, Lenuta Ciulei-Atanasiu, Gabriel Groitoru, Florin Croitoru, Valentin Gheorghiu, Dan Grigore, Mihaela Ursuleasa, Josu De Solaun Soto, Matthias Manasi, and Marin Cazacu.

The concert hall "Ion Baciu" is named after the conductor Ion Baciu. In Ploiești, Baciu organized first auditions, musical internships for students in the county, and national competitions, and was involved in community cultural activities. The orchestra became known internationally especially through the Violin Competition "Rodolfo Lipizer" in Gorizia (Italy), where for 18 years it accompanied the finalists. The Ploiești State Philharmonic Orchestra has also given concert tours in Germany, Luxembourg, Canada, Italy, France, South Korea, the Netherlands, Belgium, Greece, Spain, the Czech Republic and other countries.

The Ploiesti Philharmonic "Paul Cosntantinescu" held prestigious competitions as "Gala for Young Conductors", "Lory Walfish Piano Competition", "Eugenia Moldoveanu Vocal Contest", "Paul Constantinescu Competition", and was invited in the 2011-2012 editions into Contemporary Music Festival (SIMN) organized by Composers and Musicologists Union of Romania (UCMR).

Ploiesti Philharmonic Orchestra has various repertories from classical to modern music. Romanian modern and contemporary music can be often found in its programs. Works by composers like Tiberiu Olah, Anatol Vieru, Ştefan Niculescu, Dan Dediu, Viorel Munteanu, Sabin Pautza, Dan Buciu, Vasile Spătărelu, Irina Odăgescu-Țuțuianu, Carmen Petra Basacopol, Grigore Cudalbu and many others, were interpreted, some in first audition, in the Ploiesti Philharmonic Hall. George Enescu's creations are in repertoire of Ploiesti Philharmonic Orchestra played both nationally and internationally with a deep respect for the great Romanian composer.

== Music Directors and other artistic leaders ==
- present Ionescu Galați (Lead Conductor and Onorific Conductor)
- present Radu Postăvaru (Principal Conductor)
- present Ovidiu Bălan (Conductor)
- past Ion Baciu (Conductor)
- past Paul Popescu (Conductor)
- past Emanuel Elenescu (Conductor)
- past Charles Debie (Director)
- past George Petrescu (Director)
- past Horia Stănescu (Director)
