= Halina Czerny-Stefańska in memoriam International Piano Competition =

Polish piano competition

The Halina Czerny-Stefańska in memoriam is an international piano competition taking place in Poznań under the patronage of the Polish Ministry of Culture. Its first edition took place in September 2008.

== Prize Winners ==
Winners
Year
2008	Grand prize	1st prize	2nd prize	3rd prize (ex-a.)
	(Belarus) Olga Stezhko	(Poland) Przemysław Witek	(Poland) Radosław Sobczak	(Russia) Pavel Kolesnikov
				(South Korea) Jae-Kyung Yoo
				4th prize
				(Italy) Rinaldo Zhok
				5th prize
				(Russia) Anna Solovieva
				6th prize
				(France) Helene Tysman
