= Oliver Zeffman =

English conductor

Oliver George Zeffman (born October 1992) is a British conductor who launched and has curated the annual Classic Pride festival held at the Barbican Centre in London since 2023. The festival was Europe's first event of its type, highlighting music written by gay, lesbian and bisexual composers, and performed by LGBT musicians.

== Biography ==
Zeffman was born in London, United Kingdom. His brother is journalist Henry Zeffman. Oliver Zeffman began learning the violin aged four. He studied History and Russian at Durham University, during which he attended St. Petersburg Conservatory for one year. Zeffman founded his orchestra the Melos Sinfonia whilst still at school, later giving performances abroad. In 2017 he and the Melos Sinfonia gave the Russian premiere of George Benjamin's Written on Skin and then gave the Russian premiere of the same composer's Lessons in Love and Violence in 2019.

In 2020, during the COVID-19 lockdowns, Zeffman created Eight Songs from Isolation, commissioning composers including Thomas Adès and Nico Muhly to contribute songs that were performed by singers including Iestyn Davies and Sarah Connolly. It was released through Apple Music and Marquee TV. In 2021 Zeffman released Live at the V&A with violinist Viktoria Mullova and the Academy of St Martin-in-the-Fields on Apple Music and Marquee TV, and filmed in the Raphael Court of the Victoria and Albert Museum in London. During 2022 Zeffman continued his partnership with Apple Music with Music x Museums, a series of concerts in the Science Museum, Cutty Sark and British Library that were filmed and recorded for release in 2023 on Apple Music's Platoon label.

In 2023 Zeffman conducted the first Classical Pride concert by a major orchestra outside of the US, with the City of Birmingham Symphony Orchestra and soloists Pavel Kolesnikov, Samson Tsoy, Nicky Spence, Davóne Tines and Ella Taylor at the Barbican Centre.

In 2024 Zeffman curated a second Classical Pride festival, featuring a classical drag show judged by Monet X Change and Thorgy Thor, alongside opera singer Nicky Spence. At the Barbican Centre, Zeffman also conducted the London Symphony Orchestra playing work by composers including Aaron Copland, Cassandra Miller, Saint-Saëns, Tchaikovsky, Karol Szymanowski, and Jake Heggie.

In 2025 Zeffman curated a third Classical Pride festival, including for the first time an international performance at The Hollywood Bowl in Los Angeles where he conducted the Los Angeles Philharmonic Orchestra. The Barbican Centre hosted Voices of Joy and Sorrow, where Zeffman conducted the London Symphony Orchestra playing music by Jake Heggie, George Benjamin, Tchaikovsky and others. The concert featured soloists Jamie Barton and Cameron Shahbazi.
