= Radu Lupu =

Romanian pianist (1945–2022)

Radu Lupu CBE
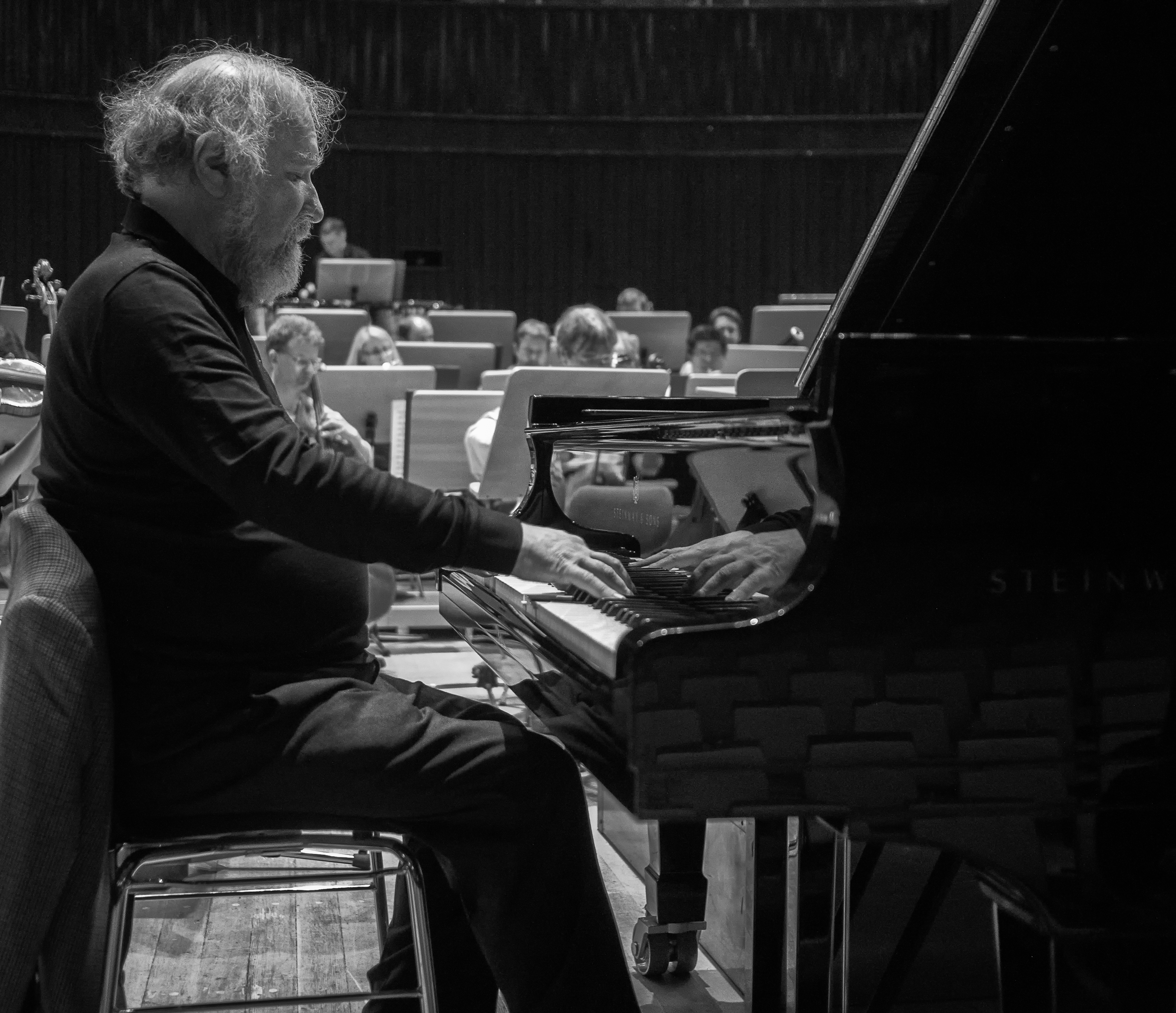
- Lupu in 2012
- Born: 30 November 1945; Galați, Romania
- Died: 17 April 2022 (aged 76); Lausanne, Switzerland
- Education: Bucharest Conservatory; Moscow Conservatory
- Occupation: Pianist
- Spouses: Elizabeth Wilson (m. 1971, divorced) Delia Bugarin (m. 1990) (Note: From an interview published in Clavier in 1992: "he is loath to speak about his personal life, including his recent marriage to a Romanian violinist [Delia Bugarin, a member of the Orchestre de Chambre de Lausanne]".)
- Awards: Franco Abbiati Prize (1989); Edison Award (1995); Grammy Award (1996); Franco Abbiati Prize (2006); Premio Internazionale Arturo Benedetti Michelangeli (2006)

Radu Lupu CBE (30 November 1945 – 17 April 2022) was a Romanian pianist. He was widely recognized as one of the greatest pianists of his time.

Born in Galați, Romania, Lupu began studying piano at the age of six. Two of his major piano teachers were Florica Musicescu (who also taught Dinu Lipatti), and Heinrich Neuhaus (who also taught Sviatoslav Richter and Emil Gilels). From 1966 to 1969, he won three major international piano competitions: the Van Cliburn International Piano Competition (1966), the George Enescu International Piano Competition (1967), and the Leeds International Pianoforte Competition (1969). These victories launched Lupu's international career, and he appeared with all of the major orchestras and at all of the major festivals and music capitals of the world.

From 1970 to 1993, Lupu made over 20 recordings for Decca Records. His solo recordings, which have received considerable acclaim, include works by Beethoven, Brahms, Grieg, Mozart, Schubert, and Schumann, including all of Beethoven's piano concertos, five piano sonatas and other solo works; the Grieg and Schumann piano concertos, as well as three major solo works of Schumann; nine piano sonatas, Impromptus and Moments musicaux of Schubert; various major solo works and the first piano concerto of Brahms; and two piano concertos of Mozart. His chamber music recordings for Decca include all of Mozart's sonatas for violin and piano with Szymon Goldberg; the violin sonatas of Debussy and Franck with Kyung Wha Chung; and various works by Schubert for violin and piano with Goldberg. He additionally recorded works of Mozart and Schubert for piano four-hands and two pianos with Murray Perahia for CBS Masterworks, Schubert songs with Barbara Hendricks for EMI, and works by Schubert for piano four-hands with Daniel Barenboim for Teldec. In addition, Lupu is also noted for his performances of Bartók, Debussy, Enescu, and Janáček, among other composers.

Lupu was nominated for two Grammy Awards, winning one in 1996 for an album of two Schubert piano sonatas. In 1995, Lupu also won an Edison Award for a disc of three major piano works of Schumann. Other awards won by Lupu include the Franco Abbiati Prize in 1989 and 2006, and the 2006 Premio Internazionale Arturo Benedetti Michelangeli award.

== Life and career ==
=== Early life and education ===
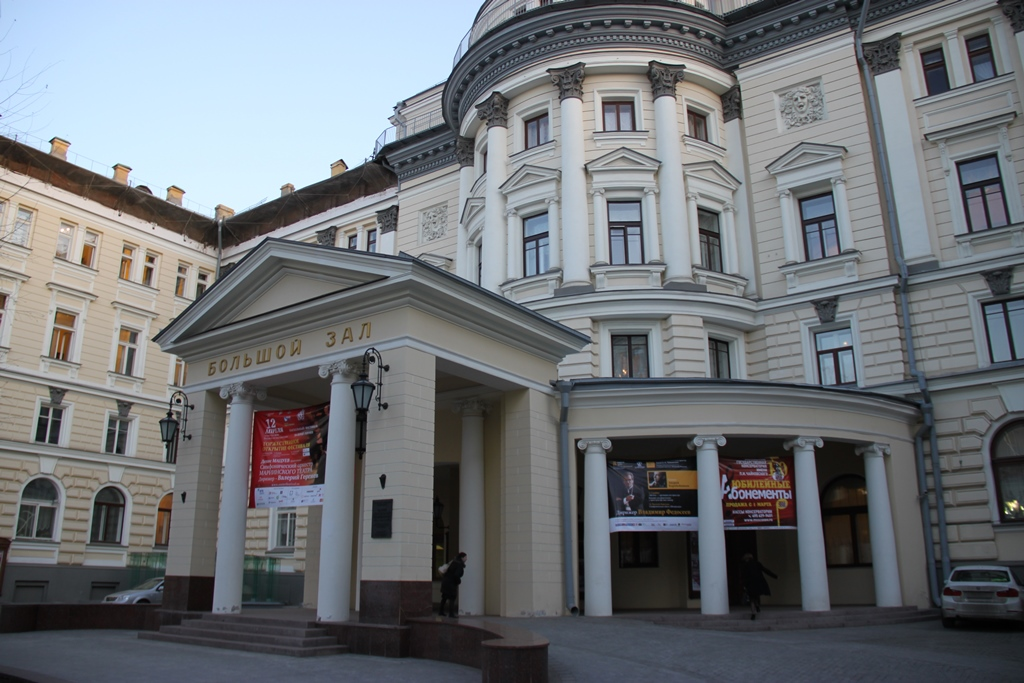
The Moscow Conservatory, where Lupu studied from 1961 to 1969

Lupu was born in Galați, Romania on 30 November 1945 to a Jewish family, the son of Meyer Lupu, an attorney, and Ana Gabor, a linguist. From his earliest days, Lupu "had always expressed himself by singing", and was given his first piano at the age of five. He began piano studies in 1951, as a six-year-old, with Lia Busuioceanu. He made his public debut in 1957, at age 12, in a concert featuring his own compositions. He told The Christian Science Monitor in 1970 that "from the very beginning I regarded myself as a composer. I was sure, and everybody else was sure, that one day I would become a famous composer". He gave up composing about four years later, saying that he thought he would be "much better as a pianist".

After completing high school in Galați, and graduating from the Popular School for the Arts in Brașov, where he studied harmony and counterpoint with Victor Bickerich, Lupu continued his piano studies at the Bucharest Conservatory (1959–1961) with Florica Musicescu (who also taught Dinu Lipatti) and Cella Delavrancea, while also studying composition with Dragos Alexandrescu. At age 16, in 1961, he was awarded a scholarship to the Moscow Conservatory, where he studied for seven years. In Moscow, he first studied with Galina Eguiazarova (a pupil of Aleksandr Goldenweiser) for two years, then with Heinrich Neuhaus (who also taught Sviatoslav Richter and Emil Gilels) and finally with his son, Stanislav Neuhaus. He graduated in 1969. Lupu was also a student of Maria Curcio, a student of Artur Schnabel.

In a 1981 interview, when asked about what types of influences his teachers had on him, Lupu answered that he thought of himself as more autodidactic: "My first teacher took me to every orchestral concert, and I am also grateful for what I learned in Moscow, but I think of myself, basically (in music anyway), as somebody who is more autodidactic. I took some from Furtwängler, Toscanini, everywhere ... more and more so since I left Moscow."

=== Early career ===
In 1965, Lupu was placed fifth at the International Beethoven Piano Competition in Vienna. (Note: Mr. Lupu, whose father is a lawyer and whose mother teaches French in high school, finished fifth at the recent Vienna International Beethoven Competition.) The following year, he won the first prize in the second Van Cliburn International Piano Competition; he also won special prizes for the best performance of a commissioned work (of Willard Straight's "Structure for Piano") and the best performance of a movement from the Aaron Copland Piano Sonata. In the finals, his performance of the first movement of Sergei Prokofiev's Piano Concerto No. 2 (Op. 16), a required piece, was described by Paul Hume of The Washington Post as "the most fiery and thunderous of any of the six finalists". In addition to the Prokofiev, he performed Beethoven's Piano Concerto No. 5 (Op. 73). Alicia de Larrocha, who was on the jury, declared Lupu a genius. "I did not expect it at all. I am just speechless," Lupu said after his victory. Shortly after the competition, in April 1967, Lupu made his debut at Carnegie Hall in New York City in a program of Beethoven, Schubert, and Chopin. However, Lupu reportedly turned down many of the other engagements that came with the prize, instead choosing to further his studies in Moscow.

A year after his Cliburn Competition victory, in 1967, Lupu won the first prize in the George Enescu International Piano Competition. Two years later, in October 1969, he won the Leeds International Piano Competition; he performed Beethoven's Piano Concerto No. 3 with the Royal Liverpool Philharmonic Orchestra under Charles Groves (Op. 37) in the final. The following month, in November 1969, Lupu made his solo debut in London; Joan Chissell of The Times wrote about his performance of the second movement of Beethoven's Piano Sonata No. 7 at the recital: "He brought what seemed like a lifetime's experience to its alternating desolation and pride. Never could music come nearer to speech."

In April 1970, Lupu made his first recording for Decca Records: Brahms' Rhapsody in B minor (Op. 79 No. 1) and Three Intermezzi (Op. 117), and Schubert's Piano Sonata in A minor (D. 784). He continued to record for the label for the following 23 years. In August 1970, the 24-year-old pianist made his debut at The Proms, performing Brahms' Piano Concerto No. 1 (Op. 15) with the BBC Symphony Orchestra conducted by Edo de Waart at the Royal Albert Hall. In November 1970, he made his first concerto recording for Decca, of the Beethoven Piano Concerto No. 3 with the London Symphony Orchestra conducted by Lawrence Foster; he also recorded Beethoven's 32 Variations in C minor (WoO 80).

Lupu's first major American appearances after his Leeds Competition victory were in February 1972 with the Cleveland Orchestra in the Brahms Piano Concerto No. 1 with Daniel Barenboim conducting at Carnegie Hall in New York City, and in October 1972 with the Chicago Symphony Orchestra in the Beethoven Piano Concerto No. 3 with Carlo Maria Giulini conducting. (Note: Lupu, 28, made a notable Chicago Symphony debut last season when he performed Beethoven's Third Piano Concerto under the direction of Carlo Maria Giulini on Oct. 5-6, 1972.) The performance of the Brahms with the Cleveland Orchestra and Barenboim was reviewed by Harold C. Schonberg, a Pulitzer Prize-winning music critic for The New York Times who had ten years prior notably lambasted the famous New York Philharmonic concert of 6 April 1962 where the same concerto was played by Glenn Gould with the New York Philharmonic conducted by Leonard Bernstein. Schonberg was also critical of the performance by Lupu and Barenboim, writing that not since the Bernstein–Gould performance "had there been such an interpretation" of the concerto, describing it as "willful, episodic and mannered, self-indulgent, capricious". However, he added that "yet through all the eccentricities came the feeling of two young musicians trying hard to get out of the rut and once in a while actually succeeding", but that "in future years this kind of approach may jell for them. Right now it does not come off."

=== Growing acclaim ===
Although Schonberg had been critical of Lupu's debut with the Cleveland Orchestra conducted by Barenboim in February 1972, he was far more enthusiastic about Lupu's performance in November 1972 of Beethoven's Piano Concerto No. 5 with the Royal Philharmonic Orchestra conducted by Lawrence Foster at Carnegie Hall, writing, in The New York Times, that

[H]is performance did much to redeem the impression he had made last season in the Brahms D minor concerto. Then he sounded mannered, finicky, artificial. This time he was a different pianist.

Schonberg added:

His proclamation in the cadenza-like opening was big and bold, featured by a penetrating though glassy tone. This set the stage for a fiery performance that was consistently interesting. It may have been banged out a bit, it may have been lacking in color resource, but it did have propulsion, and it did have ideas. And it had superb momentum aside from a few bad rhythmic groupings in the slow movement.

The following year, Lupu recorded the piano concertos of Schumann (Op. 54) and Grieg (Op. 16) with the London Symphony Orchestra conducted by André Previn, a recording described by Gramophone as "grandly commanding". In February 1974, Lupu performed a recital at Hunter College in New York, which was praised by Allen Hughes of The New York Times. Hughes declared Lupu "no ordinary pianist" and wrote about Lupu's performance of Schubert's Piano Sonata in B♭ major (D. 960).

During the Schubert, however, the audience's attentive silence was extraordinary. It was as though Mr. Lupu were employing some sort of alchemy to work a spell over everyone. That, indeed, is just about what he did, for he has that mysterious something that goes beyond technique, erudition and general musicality to reach into the sensibilities of listeners.

In November 1974, Lupu made his debut with the New York Philharmonic, performing Mozart's Piano Concerto No. 21 (K. 467) conducted by James Conlon. (Note: The orchestra's [1974–1975] regular subscription season ... will introduce two conductors in their Philharmonic debuts: One is Bernard Haitink, ... and the other is James Conlon ... Soloists scheduled to make Philharmonic debuts are ... Radu Lupu, ...) In 1975, Lupu debuted with the Concertgebouw Orchestra and gave the premiere of the André Tchaikowsky Piano Concerto, Op. 4 with the Royal Philharmonic Orchestra conducted by Uri Segal at the Royal Festival Hall. In 1976, Lupu recorded Brahms' 6 Klavierstücke (Op. 118) and 4 Klavierstücke (Op. 119), which was described by Stereo Review as "a glowing realization of what Brahms set down that leaves one at a loss for words and simply glad to have ears." In 1978, he gave his debut with the Berlin Philharmonic conducted by Herbert von Karajan at that year's Salzburg Festival. Reviewing a recital Lupu gave at Avery Fisher Hall in 1980, Andrew Porter of The New Yorker hailed Lupu as "a master of the most satisfying kind". By 1981 he had played with every major orchestra.

=== Remainder of the 20th century ===
In June 1982, Lupu made a critically acclaimed recording of Schubert's Impromptus (D. 899 & 935). John Rockwell wrote in The New York Times that Lupu's "singing tone here must be heard to be believed. Without belittling the other facets of Schubert's musical personality, he captures the composer's songful essence with a rare beauty – and, in so doing, he reaffirms once more the ability of present-day performers to do ample justice to the music of the past." In addition, Gramophone said about the recording:

To all eight pieces he brings insights all his own betokening acute awareness of the visionary in Schubert, while as piano playing pure and simple it could scarcely be lovelier in phrasing or tone. When first confronting this return to already over-recorded pieces my immediate reaction, I confess, was Why yet another? I now realize the catalogue would not have been complete without the viewpoint of so dedicated a Schubertian.

In 1989, Lupu was awarded the Franco Abbiati Prize by the Italian Critics' Association; he was awarded the prize again in 2006. In 1995, he won an Edison Award for his album of Schumann's Kinderszenen (Op. 15), Kreisleriana (Op. 16), and Humoreske (Op. 20) which was also nominated for a Grammy Award. In the Grammy Awards of 1995, he won a Grammy Award for Best Instrumental Soloist Performance (without orchestra) for his album of Schubert's Piano Sonatas in B♭ major (D. 960) and A major (D. 664).

=== 21st century ===
In 2006, Lupu was awarded the Premio Internazionale Arturo Benedetti Michelangeli and in 2016 was named a Commander of the Order of the British Empire (CBE) in the 2016 New Year Honours for services to music.

In June 2019, Lupu's agent announced that the pianist would retire from the concert stage at the end of the 2018–2019 season.

== Musical style ==
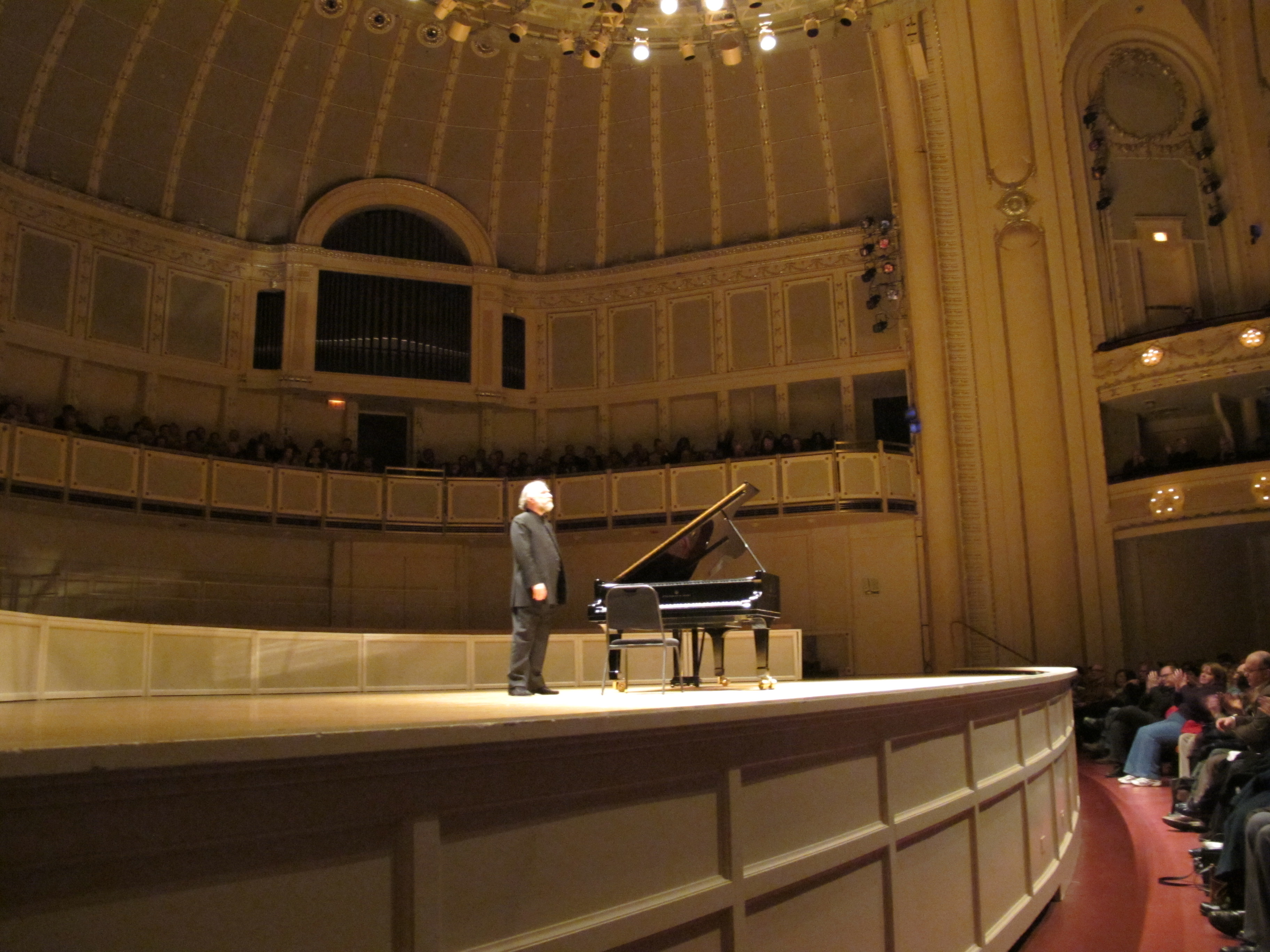
Lupu at Symphony Center in Chicago, 2010

Lupu used a regular, straight-backed chair at the piano as opposed to a standard piano bench. He told Clavier in 1981 that while sitting on a bench he tended to lean forward, raise his shoulders, become impossibly stiff and develop pains all over. He also said that he practiced with a chair at home and found it natural. Although Lupu was an admirer of the pianism of Arthur Rubinstein and Vladimir Horowitz, he named Mieczysław Horszowski as having the largest influence on his playing, saying that Horszowski "speaks to me like no one else". Lupu's initial approach to new music was to read it away from the piano, saying that he "reads more easily away from the instrument" and that "it is the only way to learn". Lupu said in regards to tone production that "everything in music comes from the head", adding: "If you have any concept of sound, you hear it in your inner ear. All you have to work for is to match that sound on the instrument. The whole balance, the line, the tone, is perceived and controlled by the head." He further described tone production as a "matching process for which [one] practices", and the physical contact of the keyboard as "a very individual thing determined by the color or timbre you hear and try to get, the piece you are playing, the phrase".

Lupu's playing garnered admiration not only from music critics, but also by fellow major artists. In a 2002 interview, Mitsuko Uchida said that "there is nobody on earth who can actually get certain range of colour, and also the control – don't underestimate this unbelievable control of his playing". Nikolai Lugansky said in an interview that Lupu "possesses the rare power of letting the music speak for itself", and András Schiff stated that Lupu had the "rare gift to illuminate anything that he plays with rare musical intelligence". Arcadi Volodos said he learned a great deal from extended talks with Lupu on Schubert sonatas, and Seong-Jin Cho named Lupu's recording of the Schubert Impromptus as one of his favourite records.

Other pianists who expressed admiration for Lupu or cited him as an inspiration in their music-making include Emanuel Ax, Daniel Barenboim, Leon Fleisher, Kirill Gerstein, Stephen Hough, Evgeny Kissin, Lang Lang, Robert Levin, Maria João Pires, Daniil Trifonov, and Yuja Wang. In addition, the conductor Yannick Nézet-Séguin cited Lupu as an inspiration while he was a piano student, saying that listening to recitals and recordings by Lupu "shaped my conception of sound from a very young age", and the cellist Steven Isserlis called him "one of the greatest artists I have ever heard or known".

== Repertoire and recordings ==
In the span of 23 years, Lupu made over 20 recordings for Decca Records. His first recording was made in the spring of 1970. Lupu's solo recordings, which have received considerable acclaim, include works by Beethoven, Brahms, Grieg, Mozart, Schubert, and Schumann. His solo recordings without orchestra include 5 Beethoven piano sonatas (Opp. 13, 27/2, 49, and 53), as well as Beethoven's two rondos for piano (Op. 51) and 32 Variations in C minor; Brahms' Piano Sonata No. 3 in F minor (Op. 5), Two Rhapsodies (Op. 79), Intermezzi (Op. 117), 6 Pieces for Piano (Op. 118) and 4 Pieces for Piano (Op. 119); nine piano sonatas of Schubert (D. 157, 557, 664, 784, 845, 894, 958, 959, 960) as well as the Impromptus (D. 899, 935) and Moments musicaux (D. 780); and Schumann's Humoreske (Op. 20), Kinderszenen (Op. 15) and Kreisleriana (Op. 16). His concerto recordings include the complete cycle of Beethoven piano concertos with the Israel Philharmonic Orchestra conducted by Zubin Mehta; the Brahms Piano Concerto No. 1 (Op. 15) with the London Philharmonic Orchestra conducted by Edo de Waart; the Grieg and Schumann piano concertos with the London Symphony Orchestra and André Previn; and two Mozart piano concertos (K. 414 and 467) with the English Chamber Orchestra conducted by Uri Segal. His chamber music recordings for Decca include all of Mozart's sonatas for violin and piano with Szymon Goldberg and various works by Schubert for violin and piano with Goldberg; the violin sonatas of Debussy and Franck with Kyung Wha Chung; the quintets for piano and winds of Beethoven (Op. 16) and Mozart (K. 452) with Han de Vries, George Pieterson, Vicente Zarzo, and Brian Pollard;. He additionally recorded works of Mozart and Schubert for piano four-hands and two pianos with Murray Perahia for the CBS Masterworks, two albums of Schubert songs with Barbara Hendricks for EMI, and a disc of works by Schubert for piano four-hands with Daniel Barenboim for Teldec.

In addition to the composers he has recorded, Lupu is also noted for his performances of Bartók, Enescu, and Janáček.

In 2024, the label Doremi began releasing a series of live recordings by Lupu. As of June 2024, the series consists of seven 2-CD sets. Although some of the repertoire overlaps with what Lupu recorded commercially, much of it greatly augments what was previously available. Vol. 2 includes recordings of Mozart's piano sonatas K. 310 and K. 545, Haydn's Andante and Variations in F minor and Piano Sonata No. 37 in D major, and Bartók's Out of Doors Suite. Vol. 3 presents Mozart's Piano Concerto No. 23 with Rudolf Kempe conducting and Beethoven's Choral Fantasy with Lawrence Foster as well as three solo piano pieces by Chopin, a composer Lupu never recorded commercially. It also includes works of a more modern vintage than found elsewhere in Lupu's output: the Piano Quintet of Shostakovich with the Gabrieli Quartet and the brief Humoresque of Rodion Shchedrin. Vol. 4 contains recordings of the Piano Sonata by Aaron Copland and another performance of Bartók's Out of Doors Suite. Vol. 5 includes recordings of Gershwin's Rhapsody in Blue and Piano Concerto in F with Dean Dixon as well as the Piano Concerto No. 2 by André Tchaikowsky, which was dedicated to Lupu, and another recording of Haydn's Piano Sonata No. 37 in D major. Vol. 6 includes Bach's Prelude & Fugue in B♭ minor from The Well-Tempered Clavier, Book 1, which represents the first available recording of Lupu playing Bach, along with more solo works by Mozart and Chopin. In addition to all these works new to Lupu's discography, the series includes alternative live recordings of many works by Mozart, Beethoven, Schubert, Franck, and Brahms.

In 2025, Decca released Radu Lupu: The Unreleased Recordings, a six-disc collection of unreleased studio sessions and radio tapes, dated between 1970 and 2002.

== Personal life ==
Lupu's first marriage was in 1971 to the cellist Elizabeth Wilson (born 1947), daughter of diplomat Sir Duncan Wilson. He lived in Lausanne, Switzerland, with his second wife Delia, a violinist in the Orchestre de Chambre de Lausanne. He had a son, Daniel.

For most of his career, Lupu often refused to grant interviews to the press out of "fear of being misunderstood or misquoted". His aversion to the press and publicity has prompted them to label him as "the reclusive Radu Lupu", with The Independent referring to him as a "woolly recluse" and "like someone dragged unwillingly into the concert hall but asked to leave his begging-bowl outside." In addition, Lupu usually did not allow radio broadcasts of his performances. In 1994, Chicago Tribune noted that Lupu's press kit then contained one single interview he granted to Clavier magazine in 1981. Other published interviews include a "conversation" that Lupu granted to Clavier in 1992 and an interview from 1975 that was aired on BBC Radio 3.

Lupu died in Lausanne, after a long illness, on 17 April 2022, aged 76.
