= Stephen Medcalf (director) =

British stage director (born 1958)

Stephen Medcalf (born 1958) is a British stage director, particularly known for his opera productions, both in the UK and abroad. He received the Italian music critics' prize, Premio Abbiati, for "Best Director" in 2005. Medcalf is married to the British soprano Susan Gritton.

== Life and career ==
Medcalf was born in Farnham Common, Buckinghamshire and attended the University of Nottingham where he read economic and social history. While at Nottingham he sang in the university's opera group chorus and directed a production of Gilbert and Sullivan's Ruddigore at the New Theatre. After graduation, he did further training as a stage director at the London Drama Studio. His first job was in stage management at the Royal Northern College of Music. He then worked at Glyndebourne Festival Opera which he describes as the place where he "learnt his craft and trade" working as an assistant director under Peter Sellars and Peter Hall. His first production for Glyndebourne as the original director was the 1994 Le nozze di Figaro which inaugurated the festival's new opera house and was later released on DVD.

From 1991 to 1997, Medcalf was Director of Productions at English Touring Opera, producing Don Giovanni, The Magic Flute, Orfeo ed Euridice, Rigoletto, Le nozze di Figaro, and L'elisir d'amore for the company. He married the soprano Susan Gritton in 1993, shortly after his production of L'elisir in which she sang the role of Adina. She has since sung leading roles in several of his productions including Tatyana in Grange Park Opera's 2013 Eugene Onegin. His original ETO production of L'elisir, which set the story in the American Mid-West, has subsequently been revived many times in Australia.

One of Medcalf's earliest productions in Italy was The Magic Flute for the Teatro Regio di Parma in 1995 conducted by John Eliot Gardiner. The production has since been revived at the Teatro Lirico di Cagliari, Teatro Regio di Parma, and the Palau de les Arts Reina Sofía in Valencia, Spain. Medcalf went on to direct new several more new productions in Italy, notably A Village Romeo and Juliet (Teatro Lirico di Cagliari 2002), The Queen of Spades (La Scala, Milan 2005), Manon Lescaut (Teatro Regio di Parma 2005), and Falstaff (Teatro Farnese, Parma 2011). He was awarded the 2005 Premio Abbiati for "Best Director" for The Queen of Spades at La Scala.

Medcalf was resident producer on the Opera Programme of the Guildhall School of Music and Drama from 1991 to 2004 where he focused the programme's public performances on rarely performed works, such as the British premieres of Donizetti's Il giovedi grasso and Martinů's Ariane. He has since returned Guildhall as a guest director, directing Almeida's Spinalba in 2010 and the British and European premiere of Ned Rorem's chamber opera, Our Town in 2012.

=== Opera productions ===
Opera productions directed by Stephen Medcalf include:

- Mascagni, Il piccolo Marat, 1992, Wexford Festival Opera
- Mozart, Le nozze di Figaro, 1994, Glyndebourne Festival Opera (inaugural performance of the new Glyndebourne opera house)
- Rimsky-Korsakov, May Night, 1995, Wexford Festival Opera
- Delius, A Village Romeo and Juliet, 2002, Teatro Lirico di Cagliari (Italian premiere)
- Tchaikovsky, The Queen of Spades, 2005, La Scala (Premio Abbiati for Best Director)
- Puccini, Manon Lescaut, 2005, Teatro Regio di Parma
- Verdi, Falstaff, 2011, Teatro Farnese in Parma (first opera production in the 17th-century theatre in 200 years)
- Verdi, Aida, 2012, Royal Albert Hall
- Foroni, Cristina, regina di Svezia, 2013, Wexford Festival Opera (Irish premiere and only the second production in modern times)
- Donizetti, Viva La Diva, 2022, Buxton Festival
