= XIII George Enescu International Piano Competition =

XIII George Enescu International Piano Competition took place in Bucharest, Romania, from September 15 to 27, 2014. The competition is held every two years and is a member of the Geneva World Federation of International Music Competitions. There have been 13 editions since the founding of the competition in 1958, and previous winners include Radu Lupu, Elisabeth Leonskaja, and Dmitri Alexeev. Spanish pianist Josu De Solaun Soto was given the First Prize, becoming the first Spanish pianist to be awarded such distinction in the 56 years of the competition's existence. The prize included $20,000, and recital and orchestral engagements.

== Jury ==
- Jean-Claude Pennetier (president)
- Rolf-Dieter Arens
- Dana Borsan
- Philippe Dinkel
- Wolfgang Manz
- Andrey Pisarev
- Alan Weiss

== Prizes ==
- First Prize: Josu de Solaun.
- Second Prize: Ilya Rashkovsky.
- Third Prize: Vassilis Varvaresos.

== Competition Results (by Rounds) ==
=== First round ===
- Dmitry Ablogin
- Lilit Artemyan
- Lia Bibileishvili
- Evgeny Brakhman
- Sofya Bugayan
- Paul Coriolan Cartianu
- Vladislav Chepinoga
- Tatiana Chernichka
- Regina Chernychko
- Emily Chiang
- Daniel Dascalu
- Madalina-Claudia Danila
- Balázs Demény
- Cristian-Mihai Dirnea
- Timofey Dolya
- Sebastian Ene
- Cédric Gremaud
- Simeon Goshev
- Sang-Il Han
- Santa Ignace
- Sang-Wook Jung
- Tatiana Kachko
- Yoon-Jee Kim
- Peter Klimo
- Soshi Koyama
- Yu Mi Lee
- Adela Liculescu
- Dinu Alexandru Mihailescu
- Mamikon Nakhapetov
- Bogdan Marian Nicola
- Woogil Park
- Dmytro Pivnenko
- Mihkel Poll
- Ilya Rashkovskiy
- Shizuka Susanna Salvemini
- Aleksandr Shaikin
- Shizhe Shen
- Denys Shramko
- Coral Solomon
- Josu De Solaun Soto
- Nozomu Sugawara
- Jenna Sung
- Ryutaro Suzuki
- Paris Tsenikoglou
- Tomoya Umeda
- Aurelia Visovan
- Asuna Yamanaka
- Yui Yoshioka
- Yelena Zorina
- Kirill Zvegintsov

=== Second round ===
- Evgeny Brakhman
- Tatiana Chernichka
- Daniel Dascalu
- Sang-Il Han
- Peter Klimo
- Adela Liculescu
- Woogil Park
- Dmytro Pivnenko
- Ilya Rashkovskiy
- Shizuka Susanna Salvemini
- Josu De Solaun Soto
- Vassilis Varvaresos
- Aurelia Visovan

=== Third round ===
(At the Romanian Athenaeum)

- Evgeny Brakhman
- Adela Liculescu
- Woogil Park
- Ilya Rashkovskiy
- Shizuka Susanna Salvemini
- Josu De Solaun Soto
- Vassilis Varvaresos

=== Fourth round ===
(At the Romanian Athenaeum, with the George Enescu Philharmonic Orchestra and Justus Frantz, conductor)

- Ilya Rashkovsky - Sergei Rachmaninov: Concerto for piano and orchestra nº3.
- Josu De Solaun Soto - Piotr Ilyich Tchaikovsky: Concerto for piano and orchestra nº1
- Vassilis Varvaresos - Piotr Ilyich Tchaikovsky: Concerto for piano and orchestra nº1

== See also ==
- History of the George Enescu International Piano Competition/Previous Winners
