= Alexander Voltz =

Australian composer

- Born: 13 April 1999 (age 27); Toowoomba, Queensland, Australia
- Education: Brisbane Boys' College; University of Queensland (BMus, BA)
- Occupations: Composer; Writer
- Organization(s): Quadrant; Australian Monarchist League
- Political party: Liberal Party of Australia

Alexander Donald Kenneth Voltz (born 13 April 1999) is an Australian composer and writer. He is also known for his political stance as a monarchist. In 2024, Voltz won the Symphonic Category of the George Enescu International Competition for his orchestral work Dunrossil Elms.

== Education ==
Voltz was born in Toowoomba, Queensland and grew up in Brisbane. He attended Brisbane Boys' College and later studied composition, history and writing at the University of Queensland, where he graduated with both a Bachelor of Music with Honours (First Class) and a Bachelor of Arts. He studied composition with Robert Davidson, Cathy Likhuta and Nicole Murphy. His mentors have included Brenton Broadstock and Brett Dean.

== Career ==
Voltz's music has been performed and supported by the London Festival of Contemporary Church Music, Melbourne Symphony Orchestra, Opera Queensland, Australian Youth Orchestra, Ensemble Offspring, Flinders Quartet and others. He is twice a semi-finalist in the composition division of the Bartók World Competition.

In 2021, Voltz independently produced his first opera, Edward and Richard: The True Story of the Princes in the Tower. He was also commissioned as part of the Australian National Academy of Music's The ANAM Set, which he described as "a census of contemporary Australian art music".

In 2022, Voltz served as Emerging Composer-in-Residence with Camerata – Queensland's Chamber Orchestra, was a recipient of the Australian Broadcasting Corporation's Composer Commissioning Fund, and placed second in the Harlow Chorus' 2022 Young Composer Competition. The following year, he commenced as the founding Music Editor of Quadrant. For his music pages in Quadrant, he has interviewed, amongst others, James MacMillan, Brett Dean, Errollyn Wallen, Samuel Andreyev, Titus Engel, and Alexander Briger. He has also written for The Spectator Australia, Australian Financial Review, The Critic and other publications. Voltz is a regular columnist for News24 (formerly Sky News Australia).

In 2024, Voltz won the Symphonic Category of the 19th George Enescu International Competition for his orchestral work Dunrossil Elms. The competition's jury consisted of, among other composers, Magnus Lindberg, Jennifer Higdon and Pascal Dusapin.

== Monarchism ==
Voltz is the National Spokesperson for the Australian Monarchist League. Following the death of Queen Elizabeth II, he appeared across national Australian media outlets, presenting the League's perspectives. In 2024, he was the League's principal spokesperson during King Charles III and Queen Camilla's tour of Australia.

Voltz directed The Queen's Platinum Jubilee Concert, Australia's largest musical tribute during the Platinum Jubilee of Elizabeth II.
