= Second Van Cliburn International Piano Competition =

1966 American competition

The Second Van Cliburn International Piano Competition took place in Fort Worth, Texas from September 26 to October 9, 1966.

Romanian pianist Radu Lupu won the competition, while Barry Lee Snyder and Blanca Uribe earned the silver and bronze medals.

== Jurors ==
  - (United States) Howard Hanson (chairman)
  - (France) Joseph Benvenuti
  - (Germany) Reimar Dahlgrun
  - (Colombia) Guillermo Espinosa
  - (Hungary) József Gat
  - (Romania) Valentin Gheorghiu
  - (Iceland) Árni Kristjánsson
  - (Hungary) Lili Kraus
  - (Spain) Alicia de Larrocha
  - (Belgium) Jean Mahaim
  - (England) Gerald Moore
  - (England) Boyd Neel
  - (United States) Ezra Rachlin (local chairman)
  - (United States) Claudette Sorel
  - (Poland) Margerita Trombini-Kazuro
  - (United States) Beveridge Webster
  - (Austria) Friedrich Wührer

== Results ==
Contestant	R1	SF	F
(Brazil) Marco Antonio Abissamra			
(United States) Francisco Aybar			
(France) Henri Barda			
(United States) Peter Basquin			
(Austria) Rudolf Buchbinder			5th
(United States) Carl Michael Cave			
(United States) Monique Charland			
(United States) Renée Chevalier			
(South Korea) Theresa Chung			
(United States) Barbara Crouse			
(Japan) Michiko Fujinuma			
(United States) Larry Graham			
(United States) Uga Grants			
(United States) Linda Greer			
(United States) Thomas Hrynkiw			
(Canada) Leslie Jones			
(United States) Larry Keenan			
(United States) Allen Kindt			
(Germany) Benedikt Köhlen			6th
(United States) Margaret Lacy			
(United States) Edward Lee			
(United States) Barry Lee Snyder			Silver medal
(Germany) Christopher Lieske			
(Philippines) María Luisa López Vito			4th
(United States) Karyl Louwenaard			
(Cuba) Henry Lowinger			
(Romania) Radu Lupu			Gold medal
(Argentina) Dante Medina			
(Bulgaria) Milena Mollova			
(United States) David Northington			
(Argentina) Eduardo Olcese			
(Canada) Shirley Pethes			
(United States) Joy Pottle			
(United States) Richard Reber			
(United States) Janet Roberts			
(United States) Pamela Ross			
(Mexico) José Sandoval			
(United States) Peter Schaaf			
(France) Catherine Silie			
(Canada) Robert Silverman			
(United States) Susan Smeltzer			
(United States) Tim Strong			
(Argentina) Ana María Trenchi			
(Colombia) Blanca Uribe			Bronze medal
(Brazil) José Flavio Varani			
(Japan) Yuko Yamaguchi			
