= The Queen's Platinum Jubilee Concert =

Brisbane, Australia 2022 music concert

- The concert's official logo
- Venue: St John's Cathedral, Brisbane, Australia
- Date(s): 6 August, 2022
- Guests: Quentin Bryce
- Website: platinumjubileeconcert.org

The Queen's Platinum Jubilee Concert was an Australian concert held on 6 August 2022 at St John's Cathedral, Brisbane that celebrated the Platinum Jubilee of Elizabeth II, Queen of Australia. The concert was directed by composer Alexander Voltz and organist Andrej Kouznetsov.

The concert featured the choirs of St John's Cathedral, Brisbane and St Andrew's Cathedral, Sydney, as well as Kouznetsov and the John Coulton Brass, performing works by Australian and British composers, including William McKie, Samuel Sebastian Wesley, George Frideric Handel, Herbert Howells, Hubert Parry, Richard Mills, Judith Weir, Brenton Broadstock, Thomas Hewitt Jones, Charles Villiers Stanford, and Alexander Voltz.

Quentin Bryce opened the concert. The concert's proceeds were donated to Australian Red Cross, to support Australians battling emergencies.

== Concert ==
=== Programme ===
The concert's programme comprised music from Elizabeth II's wedding and coronation, as well as royal works and works from the Anglican repertory. It also included a number of Australian and world premieres. Voltz and Kouznetsov described it as a "musical cross-section".

The premiere of Brenton Broadstock's Remember Them, which sets John McCrae's 'In Flanders Fields' and Laurence Binyon's 'For the Fallen' for unaccompanied choir, was notably dedicated to Prince Philip, Duke of Edinburgh, and also all the victims of war, terror, poverty and disease throughout Elizabeth II's reign. Broadstock wrote in the score: "This piece is intended to remember and honour those fallen in battle, but it could also be used to remember those who have fallen victim to the COVID-19 pandemic".

The full programme included:

- Alexander Voltz
  - Fanfare for the Platinum Jubilee of Elizabeth II (world premiere)
- Peter Dodds McCormick
  - 'Advance Australia Fair'
- William McKie
  - We wait for thy loving-kindness, O God
- Samuel Sebastian Wesley
  - Thou wilt keep him in perfect peace
- George Frideric Handel
  - Zadok the Priest
- Herbert Howells
  - Behold, O God, our defender
- Hubert Parry
  - I was glad
- Richard Mills
  - Epithalamium
- Judith Weir
  - I love all beauteous things (Australian premiere)
- Brenton Broadstock
  - Remember Them (world premiere)
- Thomas Hewitt Jones
  - In Our Service
- Charles Villiers Stanford
  - Te Deum from Service in B-flat, Op. 10
- Anon.
  - 'God Save The Queen'
- Alexander Voltz
  - Dei gratia regina (world premiere)

Originally, the programme advertised the 'Fanfare for the Wedding of Princess Elizabeth' from Two Royal Wedding Fanfares by Arnold Bax, but the work was withdrawn on the day of the concert following copyright concerns. It was replaced instead with the Australian National Anthem, 'Advance Australia Fair'.

The concert ran for about 120 minutes and included a short interval.
