= Samvel Alumyan =

Samvel Alumyan (Armenian: Սամվել Ալումյան; 1941 – 1987) was a Soviet-Armenian classical pianist, winner of the George Enescu International Piano Competition in 1967 (a prize shared ex-aequo with Radu Lupu). He was a student of Yakov Flier at the Moscow Conservatory (graduated in 1966), later becoming his assistant. He was a frequent collaborator of violinist Leonid Kogan, with whom he toured and recorded. During his years teaching at the Moscow Conservatory, one of his students was pianist Ksenia Knorre, daughter of Vera Gornostayeva, and mother of pianist Lukas Geniušas.
