= Daniel Goiți =

Romanian pianist

Daniel Goiți (born on 5 of August 1968 in Reșița) is a Romanian pianist and First Prize Winner of the prestigious George Enescu International Piano Competition, in its 1991 Edition, the first edition after the fall of Communism in Romania and also the first edition since 1970. Since his 1991 competition victory, he maintains an international performing career. He has performed as a soloist with prestigious orchestras in the USA, England, France, Italy, Germany, Austria, Greece, Japan, and Israel. He is a graduate of the Gheorghe Dima Music Academy in Cluj-Napoca, Romania where he is currently Professor of Piano and Head of the Piano Department.
