= Nagino Maruyama =

- Born: 26 September 1999; Toyoake, Aichi, Japan
- Genres: Classical music
- Occupation: Pianist
- Instrument: Piano

Nagino Maruyama (born September 26, 1999) is a Japanese classical pianist from Aichi Prefecture, Japan. She rose to international fame by becoming the youngest contestant ever when she participated in XVII International Chopin Piano Competition in 2015.

== Career ==
Maruyama's first major competition was at Osaka International Music Competition (ja:大阪国際音楽コンクール) in 2009 where she finished 1st place in the concerto section. She entered CRR de Paris (fr:Conservatoire à rayonnement régional de Paris) at the age of 12, and studied under the supervision of Olivier Gardon and Jean-Marc Luisada. After this turning point, she won several competitions, such as the "Concours International de Piano" created by Claude Kahn for classical pianists in 2013, Piano Talents Concorso Milan 2014 and Flame Competition 2014.

Maruyama has performed at several music festivals in Europe, such as in 2015 at Brussels, Belgium and music festival of Olivier Messiaen's piano works at Banyuls, France in 2017. She performed in the Weill Recital Hall at Carnegie Hall in the same year.

In parallel with her activities as a pianist, Maruyama entered the Conservatoire de Paris in 2016, admitted unanimously as she finished first in her class, with support of a special scholarship sponsored by Affiliated High School of Tokyo College of Music and Rohm Music Foundation. She entered École Normale de Musique de Paris to widen the range of her music in 2018 and graduated in 2019 in just one year. At the same time, she graduated from bachelors course of the Conservatoire de Paris and entered the masters course in 2019. She then went on to complete a PhD in 3e cycle diplôme artiste d'interpréte piano classique of the Conservatoire de Paris in 2023.

She re-entered the world classical music scene with her second prize in the Campillos International Piano Competition. She participated in various competitions and won many of them in 2024. In particular, she won both the Italian and German competitions at the Palma dOro International Piano Competition, and her musicality was widely recognized in Europe.
