= Maria Teresa Naranjo =

Mexican virtuoso pianist and teacher

Maria Teresa Naranjo Ochoa (1931, Tuxpan, Jalisco – 2007, Madrid) was a Mexican virtuoso pianist and teacher.

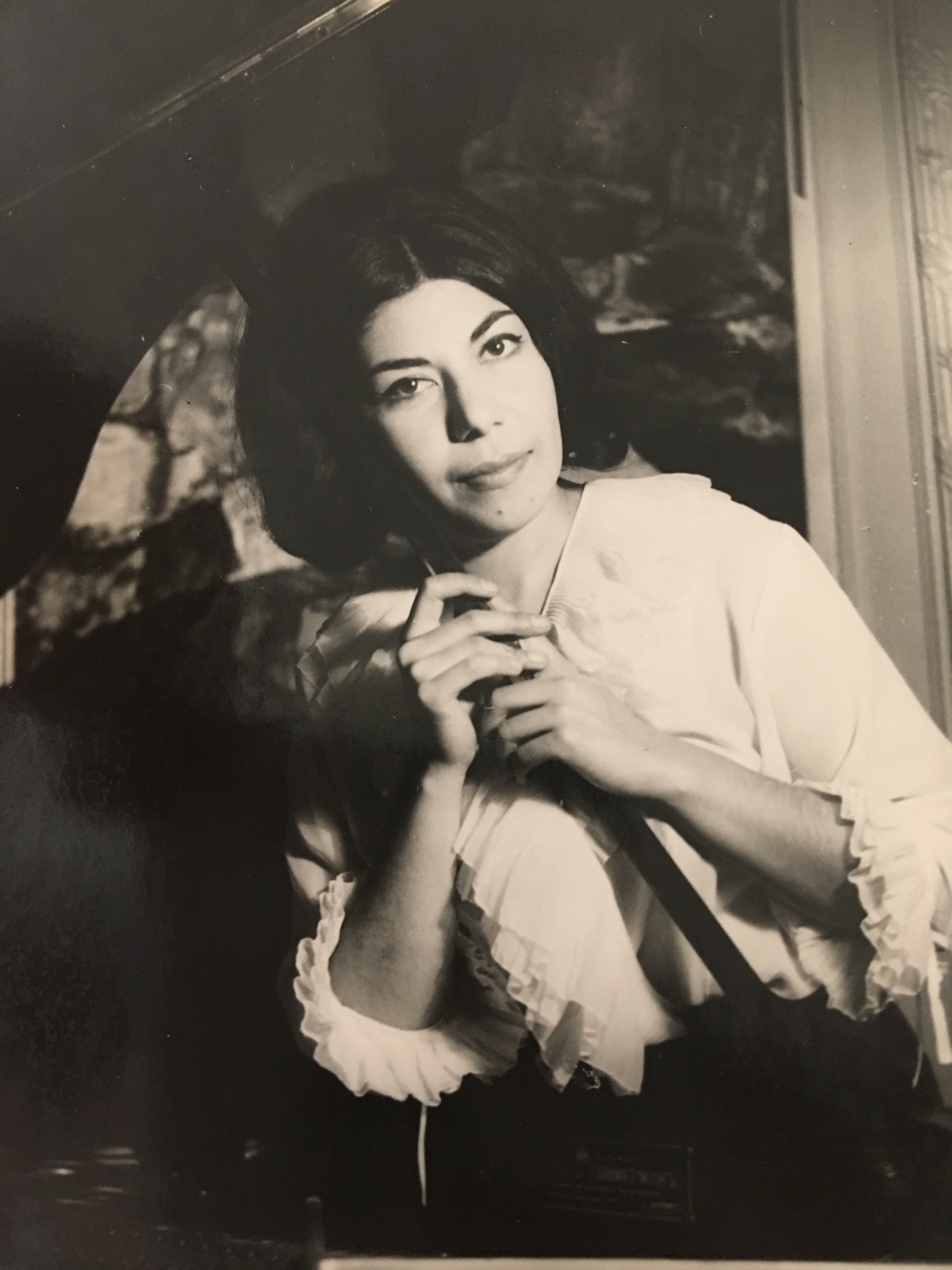
Mexican virtuoso classical pianist Naranjo Ochoa

== Life ==
After initial studies in Guadalajara (with Manuel de Jesús Aréchiga and Áurea Corona), and in Mexico City’s Conservatorio Nacional de Música (with Joaquín Amparán Cortés, Carlos Vazquez, and Guillermo Salvador), she moved to Paris in 1963, where she became a foremost student of legendary French-Brazilian pianist Magda Tagliaferro and of her assistant, French-Canadian pianist Christiane Sénart (1916-2010).

In 1977, she moved permanently to Madrid, where she lived for the next 30 years, until her death in 2007, and where she performed, taught privately and became a faculty member of the Madrid Royal Conservatory, and later of the Conservatorio Profesional de Música Amaniel (founded in 1987). As a pedagogue, she is widely known for having been one of the main teachers of Spanish virtuoso pianist Josu de Solaun Soto.

During her performing career, she played as concerto soloist with all of the main Mexican orchestras, under the batons of Iosif Conta, Leslie Hodge, Alejandro Kahan, Abel Eisenberg, Helmut Goldmann, Eduardo Mata, José Guadalupe Flores, Kenneth Klein, Hugo Jan Huss, Salvador Contreras, Francisco Orozco, José Rodríguez Frausto, Manuel de Elías, Luis Ximénez Caballero, and Arturo Javier González, among many others, playing concerti by Mozart, Beethoven, Mendelssohn, Brahms, Franck, Rachmaninov, Gershwin, Halffter, Albéniz, and Ponce. In Guadalajara, she was a frequent guest at the historic Teatro Degollado as well as a frequent concerto soloist with the Orquesta Filarmónica de Jalisco, which named her principal soloist, a position created for her, in order to be the main pianist engaged to play as concerto soloist with the orchestra.

In 1959 she won an important national competition held by the Conservatorio Nacional de Música, playing both Felix Mendelssohn’s and Manuel M. Ponce’s concerti at the Palacio de Bellas Artes in Mexico City. In 1960, she also won the National Chopin Competition, held by Canal Once (Mexico) (TV Channel 11) in collaboration with the Polish Embassy (2nd prize winner was the now famous conductor Enrique Bátiz), a prize that launched her international career. As a recitalist and chamber musician, she toured the United States, Europe, and the former USSR, participating actively with the OPIC (Organismo de Promoción Internacional de Cultura) and frequently representing Mexico at the International Rostrum of Composers in Paris, showcasing many contemporary Mexican works for piano, in particular those by Carlos Chávez, Alfredo Carrasco, Hermilio Hernández and José Pablo Moncayo.

Her interpretations of the French, Spanish (especially Albéniz, De Falla, and Mompou), Brazilian (Villa-Lobos), and Mexican repertoire (Chávez, Ponce, Villanueva, Carrasco, Moncayo), were highly praised by the press.

The famous Spanish composer Rodolfo Halffter considered her “the finest Mexican pianist of her generation”.

== Bibliography ==
- Diario ABC, March 4, 1970, Madrid, SPAIN
- Diario ABC, February 12, 1982, Madrid, SPAIN
- Program Notes, Conciertos de Mediodía, Fundación Juan March, June 25, 1984, Madrid, SPAIN
- The Laredo Times, October 31, 1961, and November 19, 1961, Laredo, TX, USA
- “Atisbos”, November 13, 1961, México City, MEXICO
- El Heraldo, May 25, 1961, Chihuahua, MEXICO
- El Informador, January 22, 1961, Guadalajara, MEXICO
- El Occidental, January 21, 1961, Guadalajara, MEXICO
