= Sofya Melikyan =

Armenian pianist

Sofya Melikyan Սոֆյա Մելիքյան
- Born: 11 February 1978 (age 47); Yerevan, Armenian SSR, Soviet Union
- Genres: Classical
- Occupation: Pianist
- Instrument: Piano

Sofya Melikyan (Note: Armenian: Սոֆյա Մելիքյան, romanized: Sofya Melikʻyan) (born 11 February 1978) is an Armenian pianist, born in Yerevan.

To date, Melikyan toured throughout Spain, Germany, France, Russia, Canada, Armenia, Japan, Australia, Italy, Serbia and the U.S. She appeared as a soloist with the Armenian Philharmonic Orchestra, Radio and Television Symphony Orchestra of Spain, Cordoba Symphony Orchestra, Valencia Symphony Orchestra, New Europe Chamber Orchestra, Philharmonic Orchestra of Andalucía, among others.

Melikyan's performances have been broadcast at National Radio and Television of Spain, National Radio and Television of Armenia, National Radio of Catalonia, Chicago WFMT Radio Station, Muzzik French Television Station, New York WXQR Radio Station, among others. Melikyan has also released two CDs featuring the music of Haydn, Schumann, Rachmaninoff, Albeniz, Dutilleux and Khachaturian.

Sofya Melikyan has been awarded First Prize and a Prize for outstanding Music Talent at the Marisa Montiel International Piano Competition in Linares, First Prize at the Ibiza International Piano Competition in Spain, First Prize for Music Interpretation awarded by “Amigos del Colegio de España” Association in Paris. She has also received top and special prizes at the 15th Jose Iturbi and Maria Canals International Competitions in Spain.

Recent and upcoming performance highlights include tours in Japan, Australia, Canada, Europe and USA; appearances at Great Lakes Chamber Music Festival with violist Kim Kashkashian; European tour with Sima Trio; concerto appearances with the Armenian Philharmonic Orchestra, and Radio and Television Orchestra of Spain.

Sofya Melikyan completed her studies at the Royal Conservatory of Madrid with Joaquin Soriano, École Normale de Musique de Paris with Ramzi Yassa and Manhattan School of Music in New York where she was a scholarship student of Solomon Mikowsky. Other pianists who have mentored her are Brigitte Engerer, Galina Eguiazarova and Elena Tatulyan.
