= Szczepan Kończal =

Polish classical pianist (born 1985)

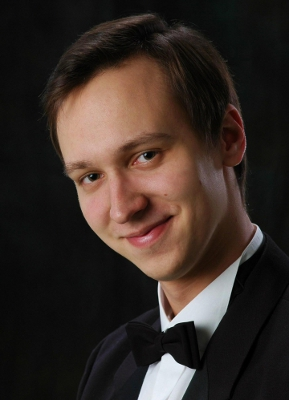

Szczepan Kończal (Polish pronunciation: ʂtʂɛpan kɔɲtʂal) (born on 27 May 1985, in Katowice, Poland) is a Polish classical pianist who has won prizes in many international music competitions held in more than a dozen countries.

== Education ==
Kończal graduated with the highest distinction (Primus inter pares medal) from the Karol Szymanowski Academy of Music in Katowice, where he studied under Prof. Józef Stompel's guidance. He has participated in masterclasses with such artists as Krystian Zimerman, Peter Donohoe, Dang Thai Son, Alexander Korsantia, Joan Havill, Bernard Ringeissen, John Perry, Andrzej Jasiński, Lee Kum-Sing, Victor Merzhanov.

== Competitions ==
Kończal has been a prize-winner of several piano competitions: 16th Vianna da Motta International Music Competition (5th prize and special award for the best interpretation of the mandatory work, Lisbon, Portugal, 2007; WFIMC), 11th UNISA International Piano Competition (6th prize, Pretoria, South Africa, 2008; WFIMC), 4th Tbilisi International Piano Competition (3rd prize, Georgia, 2009; WFIMC), 2nd International Piano Competition Spazio Teatro (1st prize and special award, Milan, Italy, 2010), 1st Luciano Luciani International Piano Competition (1st prize, Laurignano, Italy, 2011), 3rd Ella Philipp International Piano Competition (1st prize, Timișoara, Romania, 2011), Campillos International Piano Competition (3rd prize, Spain, 2009), 9th Concours Grieg – International Competition for Pianists (2nd prize and two special awards, Oslo, Norway, 2008). Finalist of the Tallinn International Piano Competition (Estonia, 2006), triple laureate of the National Frederick Chopin Piano Competitions in Warsaw in 2003, 2004 and 2005, semi finalist of the 15th International Frederick Chopin Piano Competition in Warsaw (2005; WFIMC). Earlier, he was awarded 1st prizes in seven international and national piano competitions for youth, as well as 2nd prize in the 7th Takasaki International Art and Music Competition (Japan, 2001).

== Festivals ==
Kończal participated in the 60th International Chopin Festival in Duszniki-Zdrój (2005), the 1st Warsaw Chopin Festival (2005), the 2nd Rubinstein Piano Festival in Łódź (2011), the 39th Festival of Polish Piano Art in Słupsk (2005), the 13th Festival New Year Music Celebrations in Tbilisi (Georgia 2010), the 14th Kuressaare Kammermuusika Päevad (Estonia, 2008), Festival Premiar a Excelência in Oeiras (Portugal, 2009), Festival La Grande Musica a Maso Spilzi in Folgaria (Italy, 2010) and in concert seasons: at the Boğaziçi University in Istanbul (Turkey, 2009), Serate Musicali and Rassegna Musicali – both in Milan (Italy, 2010).

== Scholarships ==
Kończal has received scholarships from: the Ministry of Culture and National Heritage on six occasions (1998, 2002, 2005, 2006, 2007, 2008), the Prime Minister of Poland (2002), the Hugo Kołłątaj Foundation (2003), the International Frederick Chopin Foundation (2003). During 1998-2004 he was supported by the Polish Children's Fund. In 2010 he became a laureate of the national program Młoda Polska (prestigious scholarship given by the Minister of Culture).

== Performances ==
Kończal has performed with such orchestras as: Sinfonia Varsovia, Silesian Philharmonic, Toruń Symphony Orchestra, Beethoven Academy Orchestra, Estonian National Symphony Orchestra, Orquesta Gulbenkian, Turkish Presidential Symphony Orchestra, Banatul Philharmonic of Timișoara, Chamber Orchestra of South Africa and such conductors as: Antoni Wit, Tadeusz Strugała, Michał Klauza, Szymon Bywalec, Jerzy Swoboda, Marcin Nałęcz-Niesiołowski, Andres Mustonen, Mitsuyoshi Oikawa, Jüri Alperten, Heiko Mathias Förster, Per Sigmund Thorp, Péter Csaba, Gheorghe Costin, Arjan Tien.

He has appeared at many venues in Poland, Italy, Portugal, Spain, Turkey, Germany, Belgium, England, Norway, the Czech Republic, Slovakia, Ukraine, Lithuania, Estonia, Romania, Georgia, Kyrgyzstan, South Africa, Japan and Canada.

In 2010 he toured Turkey (May) and England (June).
