= VII Iowa International Piano Competition =

The VII Iowa Piano Competition took place in Sioux City, Iowa, on March 7, 8 and 9th, 2013. Originally started as an annual event in 2005, the Iowa Piano Competition is, since 2011, held every two years. Competitors range in age from 18 to 35 years old. Applications from all over the world were submitted by the competitors (CD recording of their playing) and judged by a preliminary judging panel. 12 pianists were selected (as were 7 alternates), and were invited for the three live stages at Sioux City's famed Orpheum Theatre. The first round consisted of a solo recital. The second round consisted of a chamber music performance with members of the Rawlins Piano Trio, violinist Eunho Kim and cellist Marie-Elaine Gagnon. The final round consisted of a performance of a Beethoven concerto with the Sioux City Symphony Orchestra, conducted by Ryan Haskins. The competition awarded a total of $14,000 in prize money.

== Jury ==
  - Douglas Humpherys
  - Marian Hahn
  - Arthur Greene

== PRIZES ==
  - FIRST PRIZE ------ Wayne Weng
  - SECOND PRIZE ------------- Josu De Solaun Soto
  - THIRD PRIZE ---------------- Julia Siciliano
  - Fourth prize ------- Shen Lu
  - Fifth prize ----------------------- Jee In Hwang
  - Sixth prize ----------------------- Emily Chiang

== Competition Results (by Rounds) ==
=== First Round (Solo Round) ===
  - Moye Chen
  - Emily Chiang
  - Hui Shan Chin
  - Jennifer Chu
  - Josu De Solaun Soto
  - Maxwell Foster
  - Jee In Hwang
  - Hanchien Lee
  - Lu Shen
  - Julia Siciliano
  - Wayne Weng
  - Xixi Zhou

=== Second Round (Chamber Music Round) ===
  - Emily Chiang
  - Josu de Solaun Soto
  - Jee In Hwang
  - Lu Shen
  - Julia Siciliano
  - Wayne Weng

Trio performances with Rawlins Trio members Eunho Kim, violinist and Marie-Elaine Gagnon, cellist

=== Final Round (Concerto Round) ===
  - Wayne Weng --- Ludwig van Beethoven: Concerto for piano and orchestra nº5
  - Josu de Solaun Soto --- Ludwig van Beethoven: Concerto for piano and orchestra nº3
  - Julia Siciliano --- Ludwig van Beethoven: Concerto for piano and orchestra nº4

== See also ==
Sioux City Symphony Orchestra. Ryan Haskins, conductor.
