= Campillos International Piano Competition =

Annual piano competition held in Spain

The Campillos International Piano Competition (Spanish: Concurso Internacional de Piano de Campillos) is a Spanish annual professional piano competition held in Campillos, Málaga. It was founded in 2007.

As of the 16th competition (2022), the first prize winner was awarded €4,000.

== Winners ==
Year	1st prize	2nd prize	3rd prize
2007	(China) Li Chenyin	(Russia) Nikolay Shalamov	(France) Aimo Pagin
2008	(Ukraine) Marina Baranova	(Italy) Scipione Sangiovanni	(Cuba) Yenifert Prado
2009	(Russia) Alexander Yakovlev	(Russia) Ilya Rashkovsky (Romania) Arcadie Triboi	(Poland) Szczepan Konczal
2010	(Russia) Aleksei Yevgenyevich Chernov	(China) Lu Shen (Israel) Maria Yulin	(Italy) Sebastian Di Bin (Spain) José Ramón García Pérez
2011	(Ukraine) Stanislav Khristenko	(Russia) Nikolay Medvedev	(Taiwan) Hsu Ting-chia
2012	(Russia) Alexey Starikov	(Spain) Antonio Bernaldo de Quirós (Japan) Natsuko Nishimoto	(Belarus) Tamara Serikova
2013	(South Korea) Yedam Kim	(South Korea) Young-kyung Song (Germany) Katherina Treutler	(Spain) Pablo Martínez Martínez
2014	(Japan) Kazuya Saito	(Spain) Antonio Galera López (Germany) Katharina Gross	(Germany) Alica Müller
2015	(Kazakhstan) Samson Tsoy	(Russia) Svetlana Andreeva (Japan) Ryutaro Suzuki	(Japan) Yasuyo Segawa
2016	Not awarded	(South Korea) Christina Choi (South Korea) Joon Yoon	(Ukraine) Mariia Iudenko (Greece) Nefeli Mousoura
2017	(United Kingdom) Daniel Hyun-woo Evans	(Austria) Florian Feilmair	(Japan) Shotaro Nishimura
2018	(Lithuania) Rokas Valuntonis	(Georgia (country)) Mamikon Nakhapetov	(Uzbekistan) Tamila Salimdjanova
2019	(Japan) Mayaka Nakagawa	Not awarded	(Ukraine) Vasyl Kotys
2020	(Japan) Maria Eydman	(Ukraine) Maria Narodytska	(Ukraine) Illia Ovsharenko
2021	(Russia) Roman Kosyakov	(United Kingdom) Noah Zhou	(Hong Kong) Ho Lau Shing
2022	(South Korea) Jeongjin Kim	(Japan) Nagino Maruyama	(Ukraine) Danylo Saienko
2023	(South Korea) Shinyoung Lee	(Russia) Daria Vasileva	(South Korea) Miyeon Lee
2024	(United States) Charles Berofsky	(China) Wenjia Geo (Russia) Philipp Lynov	Not awarded
