= Anna Tifu =

Italian classical violinist

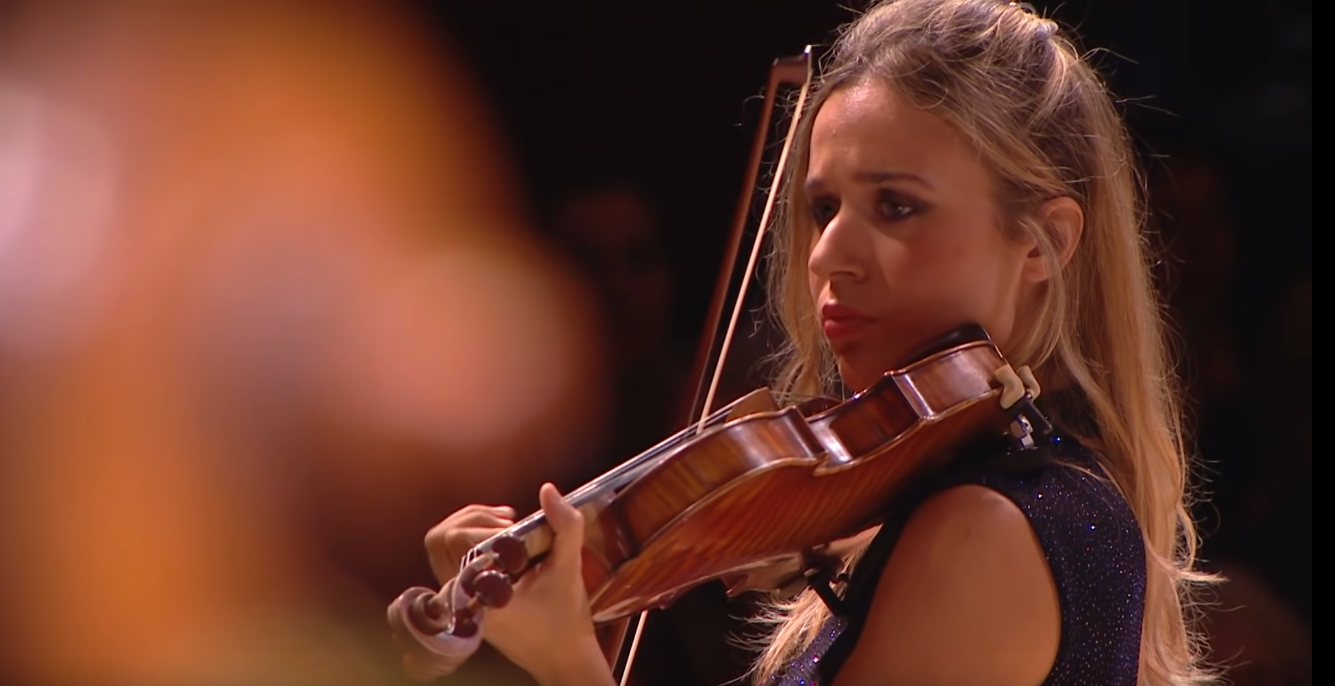
- Anna Tifu in concert - 2020
- Born: Cagliari, Italy
- Education: Curtis Institute of Music
- Occupation: Classical violinist
- Awards: George Enescu International Competition
- Website: www.annatifu.com

Anna Tifu is an Italian classical violinist who has made an international career. She won the George Enescu International Competition in 2007.

== Career ==
Anna Tifu was born to a Romanian father and Italian mother in Cagliari. She began playing the violin at age six, taught by her father. She appeared first as a soloist at age eleven with the Orchestre National des Pays de la Loire. A year later, she played Bruch's Violin Concerto No. 1 at La Scala in Milan. She won the Vittorio Veneto competition in 1994, the Viotti-Valsesia competition in 1998, and the international Marcello Abbado competition in 1999. She studied at the Academy Walter Stauffer in Cremona with Salvatore Accardo, and at Academy Chigiana in Siena, graduating in 2004. She won a scholarship of the Mozart Gesellschaft of Dortmund, and studied at the Curtis Institute of Music in Philadelphia with Shmuel Ashkenazy, Pamela Frank and Aaron Rosand.

Tifu plays a 1739 Carlo Bergonzi "Mischa Piastro", on loan from the foundation Pro Canale of Milan. Previously she played the 1716 Antonio Stradivari "Marèchal Berthier" ex Napoleon, on loan from the same foundation. She has appeared with orchestras and chamber ensembles, such as the Orchestra Nazionale della RAI di Torino, the Orchestra dell'Accademia Nazionale di Santa Cecilia, the Orchestra della Fondazione Arena di Verona, the Orchestra del Teatro La Fenice di Venezia, the Simon Bolivar Orchestra of Venezuela, the Dortmunder Philharmoniker, the George Enescu Philharmonic Orchestra, the National Radio Orchestra of Romania and the Munich Chamber Orchestra, with conductors including Gustavo Dudamel, Yuri Temirkanov, Mikko Franck, Ezio Bosso, Christoph Poppen and Justus Frantz.

In 2007, Tifu won the George Enescu International Competition. She played Paganini's Second Violin Concerto with the Stuttgarter Philharmoniker, conducted by Marc Piollet, at the Stuttgart Liederhalle in 2017. In 2018, she opened the season in Paris, with the Orchestre philharmonique de Radio France, conducted by Mikko Franck. In February 2020, she performed concerts in Turkey with the Tekfen Philharmonic, conducted by Aziz Shokhakimov, including Chausson's Poème and Ravel's Tzigane. In October 2020, she played Mendelssohn's Violin Concerto with the Nordwestdeutsche Philharmonie, conducted by Yves Abel. A reviewer noted her constant interaction with the conductor, unstrained virtuosity, and warmth and temperament in the first cadenza.

Tifu recorded Prokofiev's Sonata for Two Violins, Op. 56, with Pavel Berman in 2010, and Tzigane for Warner Classics with pianist Giuseppe Andaloro in 2017.

She served on the jury of the Sanremo Music Festival 2014, and on the jury of the Paganini Competition in 2018.
