= Franco Abbiati Prize =

Italian classical music award

The Franco Abbiati Prize (Italian: Premio Franco Abbiati della critica musicale italiana) is an annual award that has been presented by the National Association of Music Critics in Italy since 1980. Named after the Italian musicologist Franco Abbiati, past winners of the award have included Claudio Abbado, Daniel Barenboim, Leonard Bernstein, Myung-whun Chung, Valery Gergiev, Carlo Maria Giulini, Sergiu Celibidache, John Eliot Gardiner, Leonidas Kavakos, Carlos Kleiber, Evgeny Kissin, Radu Lupu, Zubin Mehta, Arturo Benedetti Michelangeli, Seiji Ozawa, Wolfgang Sawallisch, Esa-Pekka Salonen, Pierre Boulez, Riccardo Muti, Maurizio Pollini, András Schiff, Grigory Sokolov, Jeffrey Tate, Alpesh Chauhan, Arcadi Volodos, and Krystian Zimerman, among many others.
