= I European Union Piano Competition =

The I European Union Piano Competition took place in Prague and Ostrava from June 24–29, 2009, as part of the cultural program accompanying the Czech Presidency of the Council of the European Union. It was jointly organized by the International Dvořák Society and European Piano Teachers Association (EPTA). The purpose of the competition was to deepen the cultural integration of the member states and to find the most promising young pianist of the European Union. The selection of the candidates (first round) was provided with the help of embassies, Ministries of Culture, EPTA organizations, and leading European music schools and institutions. Only candidates delegated from those authorities were accepted to participate, one candidate for each EU country. A total of 27 pianists were accepted to the Semi-final Round in Prague, which consisted of a 60-minute piano recital, performed at the Nostitz Palace. Four finalists where then chosen to perform with one of the leading Czech orchestras, the Janáček Philharmonic Orchestra (formerly known as the Czech Radio Orchestra), in a concert broadcast by both Czech Television and Czech Radio. Pianist Josu de Solaun Soto was given the First Prize and Audience Prize. The prize included a cash award and a string of recital and orchestral engagements.

== Jury ==
  - Radoslav Kvapil (president)
  - Justas Dvarionas
  - Diane Andersen
  - Walter Groppenberger
  - Peep Lassmann
  - Malcolm Troup

== Prizes ==
  - First Prize ------ Josu de Solaun Soto
  - Second Prize ------------- Matej Arendárik
  - Finalist Diploma (ex-aequo) ------- Fiachra Garvey ----- Raul Peixoto Da Costa
  - Audience Prize (by vote)------------------------------------------------------------ Josu de Solaun Soto

== Competition results (by rounds) ==
=== First round ===
After a three-month-long screening process, 27 pianists were selected to participate, one candidate for each EU country. The selection of candidates for this first round was provided with the help of Ministries of Culture and other organizations.

=== Semi-final round ===
June 24–27, Nostitz Palace, Prague

  - Andreas Eggertsberger
  - Rafael Theissen
  - Victoria Vassilenko
  - Eleni Mavromoustaki
  - Ladislav Dolezel
  - Kristoffer Nyholm Hyldig
  - Maksim Stsura
  - Maija Vaisanen
  - Nairi Badal
  - Felix Wahl
  - Maria Stratigou
  - Istvan Lajko
  - Fiachra Garvey
  - Ruta Birzule
  - Sonata Alsauskaite-Mikule
  - Jean Muller
  - Alexei Galea
  - Nicolas van Poucke
  - Raul Peixoto da Costa
  - Ivan Fercic
  - Matej Arendarik
  - Josu de Solaun Soto
  - Peter Friis Johansson
  - Mishka Rushdie Momen

=== Final round ===
June 29, Great Hall, Culture Palace, Ostrava

  - Josu de Solaun Soto --- Sergei Rachmaninov: Concerto for piano and orchestra nº3
  - Fiachra Garvey --- Sergei Rachmaninov: Rhapsody on a Theme by Paganini
  - Matej Arendarik --- Antonín Dvořák: Concerto for piano and orchestra
  - Raul Peixoto da Costa --- Frédéric Chopin: Concerto for piano and orchestra nº1

Janáček Philharmonic Orchestra. Theodore Kuchar, conductor.

== See also ==
- Josu De Solaun Soto
