= Nefeli Mousoura =

Nefeli Mousoura Νεφέλη Μούσουρα
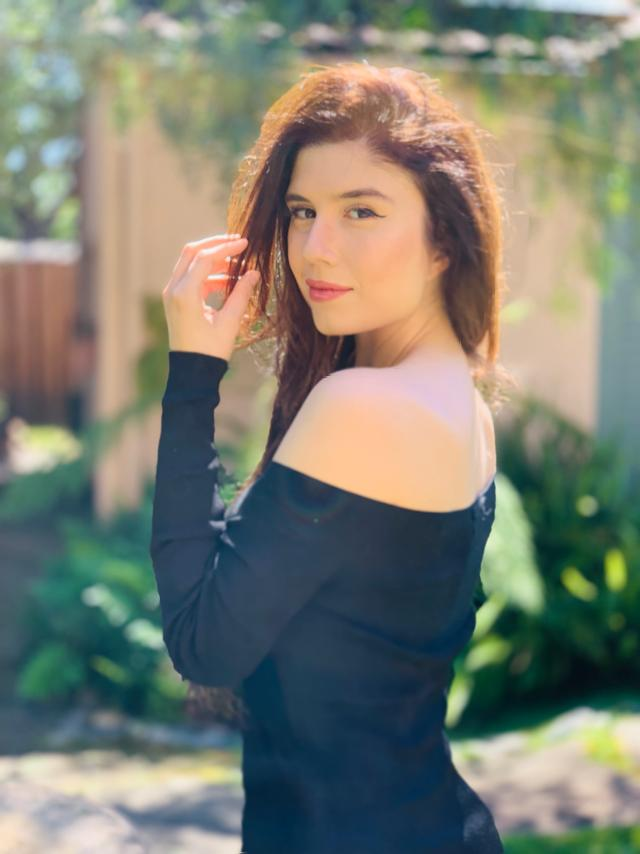

Background information
- Born: 1988 or 1989 (age 36–37)
- Instrument: Piano
- Website: https://www.nefelimousoura.com/

Nefeli Mousoura (Greek: Νεφέλη Μούσουρα; c. 1989–1988) is a Greek classical pianist.

== Biography ==
She graduated with a Bachelor of Arts and a Master of Arts in Piano Solo Performance with highest Distinction from the Mozarteum University of Salzburg, after receiving scholarships from the Onassis Foundation and the Gina Bachauer International Music Association. Among her teachers were Imre Rohmann and Rolf Plagge. She also has a Bachelor of Arts in Musicology from the National and Kapodistrian University of Athens. She began piano lessons at age four.

Mousoura's repertoire focuses on the First Viennese School and the Romantic music of the 19th century.

Her appearances include concerts and master classes in China, Russia, the United States and Europe.

== Prizes and awards ==
- 2005, Competition of Greek Ministry of Culture: First Prize
- 2009, Academy of Athens Piano Prize, which has been a subject in major Greek news media
- 2010, Andros International Piano Competition: First Prize
- 2014, Gina Bachauer Prize
- 2016, Campillos International Piano Competition: Third Prize, which has been a subject on major Greek news media

== Notable performances ==
- 2016, live recital for the Third Programme of the Hellenic Broadcasting Corporation
- 2017, tribute recital to Rena Kyriakou at the Athens Concert Hall
- 2018, national TV broadcast of a concerto performance with the Greek National Symphony Orchestra for the Hellenic Radio and Television 2 of the Hellenic Broadcasting Corporation aired also in 2019
- 2018, tribute recital to Claude Debussy at the Athens Conservatory’s Aris Garoufalis Concert Hall
- 2019, recital given in Greece to ambassadors and other members of the diplomatic missions of Austria, China, the Czech Republic, Georgia, Germany, Italy, Japan, Kazakhstan, Luxembourg, Moldova, Montenegro, the Palestinian Authority, Romania and Ukraine
- 2019, debut recital at the prestigious Salzburger Festspiele. Her participation in the Festival has been a subject of major Greek media, including an announcement by the Greek newspaper Το Πρώτο Θέμα, a live interview by the Greek TV network ANT1 and a review by the Greek newspaper Τα Νέα, which was also featured at the printed newspaper headlines
