= Yibai Chen =

Chinese concert cellist

Yibai Chen (born 2001, Chinese: 陈亦柏) is a Chinese concert cellist. He is the second prize winner of the Queen Elisabeth Competition in Brussels, Belgium in 2022 and fifth prize winner of the Tchaikovsky International Competition in Moscow, Russia in 2019.

== Biography ==
Chen started cello at the age of five studying Meijuan Liu at the affiliated elementary School of Shanghai Conservatory of Music. He studied with Liu until 2016 where he moved to Berlin to study under Danjulo Ishizaka at the Berlin University of the Arts. Chen later obtained his bachelor's at the university in 2019. As of, Chen is student at Hochschule für Musik in Basel, Switzerland continuing his studies with Ishizaka.

Chen currently plays on a cello made circa 1780-1800 by Giuseppe I Guadagnini.

== Awards ==
- 2018: Second prize, George Enescu International Competition
- 2018: Third prize, Lutoslawski International Cello Competition
- 2019: Fifth prize, Tchaikovsky International Competition
- 2022: Second prize, Queen Elisabeth Competition
