= Maximino Zumalave =

Spanish orchestra conductor and pianist

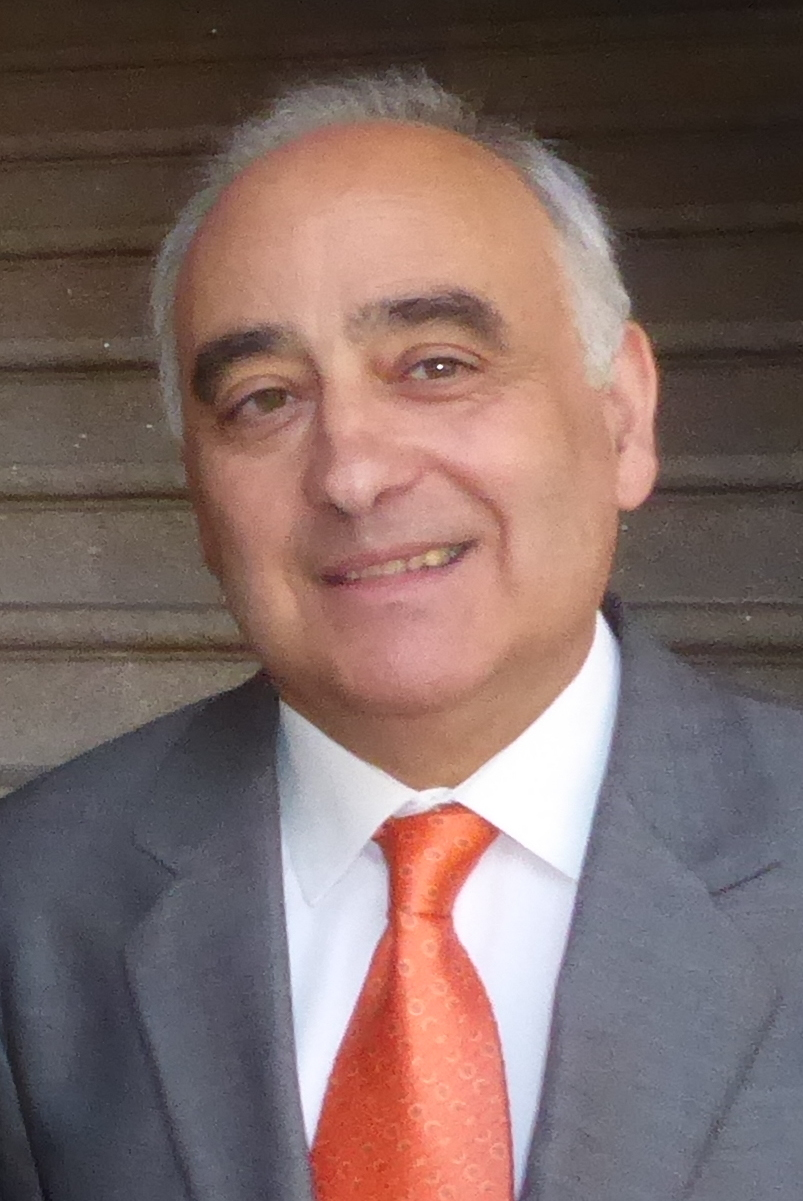
- Born: 22 January 1956 (age 70); Santiago de Compostela, España
- Citizenship: Spanish
- Occupations: Conductor and Pianist
- Awards: Medalla Castelao (2008) Premio Cultura Galega de Música (2016)
- Website: www.maximinozumalave.com/biografia_en.html

Maximino Zumalave (born 22 January 1956 in Santiago de Compostela) is a Spanish orchestra conductor and pianist.

== Education ==
Maximino Zumalave graduated in Marine Biology, piano, and conducting. He studied in Santiago de Compostela, Madrid, Vienna and Stuttgart with Angel Brage, Guillermo González, Rosa Sabater, John Eliot Gardiner and Helmuth Rilling.

== Career ==
=== Conductor ===
Maximino Zumalave founded the Royal Philharmonic Orchestra of Galicia, sharing the joint artistic direction with Helmuth Rilling until the year 2000. He is currently the Principal Guest Conductor of the Royal Philharmonic Orchestra of Galicia and Joint Director of the School for Advanced Musical Studies in Santiago; he previously served as Principal Guest Conductor of the Galicia Symphony Orchestra and Principal Conductor of the Santiago University Choir and the Collegium Compostellanum.

He has conducted the Stuttgart Chamber Orchestra, the Bach-Collegium Stuttgart, the English Baroque Soloists, The English Chamber Orchestra, the Prague Symphony Orchestra, the Monteverdi Choir, the Choir of the Prague Philharmonic Orchestra, the Orchestra of the Sofia National Opera, the Brabants Orchestra Eindhoven, the National Orchestra of Lille, the Orkest van het Ossten, the Odense Symphony Orchestra, the Gächinger Kantorei and the Oporto Symphony Orchestra. He has worked with soloists of the stature of Tzimon Barto, Charlotte Margiono, María Bayo, Ernesto Bitetti, Veronique Gens, Alicia de Larrocha, Rudolf Buchbinder, Aldo Ciccolini, Wolfgang Holzmair, Josep Colom, Iris Vermillion, the Labéque sisters, Nicolaus Lahusen, Agustín Leon Ara, Joaquín Achúcarro, Valentin Gheorghiu, Anthony Rolfe Johnson, Gyorgy Sandor, Alicia Nafé, Joaquín Soriano, María Orán, and Frank Peter Zimmermann, amongst others.

He has performed in concert all over Europe with legendary mezzo Teresa Berganza.

In Spain, he has conducted the National Orchestra of Spain, the Madrid Symphony Orchestra, the City of Barcelona Symphony Orchestra, the Tenerife Symphony Orchestra, the Orchestra of the Principality of Asturias, the Queen Sofía Chamber Orchestra, the Royal Philharmonic Orchestra of Seville, the City of Granada Orchestra, the RTVE Choir and the Prince of Asturias Foundation Choir.

Outside of the field of classical music, he has collaborated in recordings and concerts with artists like the pop star Björk and the noted Celtic group Milladoiro (conducting the English Chamber Orchestra in the suite lacobus Magnus, recorded in London).

Zumalave conducted a pan-European choir of 90 young singers during a highly successful tour to commemorate Santiago de Compostela as European City of Culture 2000

In February 1995 he was inducted to the Royal Galician Academy of Arts. He also received the Castelao Medal in 2008 and the Premio da Cultura Galega in 2016.

=== Educator ===
As an educator, Zumalave frequently organizes massive didactic concerts and regular master classes as Chairman of Lyrical Theatre at the International Music University in Compostela. He once explained and conducted the Pastoral Symphony in front of nearly 14,000 students. He is also a member of the Neue Bachgesellschaft (New Bach Society) and procured for Santiago de Compostela the Spanish seat for the courses of the Internationale Bachakademie Stuttgart. Additionally, Zumalave is a professor of Symphonism at the Música en Compostela International University Courses of Spanish Music Interpretation and Information.

He has been invited in numerous occasions to participate as a member of the jury in many contests and international awards: President of the Jury of the 2003 edition of the Mariele Ventre awards for choirmasters in Bologna; President of the Jury of the Galician Music Awards 2002; President of the Jury of the International Piano Competition "Cidade de Ferrol" 2002 (and member of the jury in some of the previous editions); Member of the Jury of the "Andrés Gaos" composition awards (in several editions, the last one, the 5th, in 2003); Member of the Jury of the Auditorio de Galicia Composition Awards 2003; Member of the Jury for the selection of scholarship holders of the Foundation Pedro Barrié de la Maza in several occasions; Member of the jury for the selection of scholarship holders of the Delegation of A Corunna; Member of the commission of the Zuid-Nederlandse voor Hogeschool Muziek Maastricht; Member of the Jury of the 52º Concorso Polifonico Internazionale "Guido D' Arezzo" 2004.

== Musicianship ==
Maestro Zumalave conducted the presentation concert of the Stuttgart Chamber Orchestra during their first tour in Spain in 1988(broadcast live on Spanish television from the Teatro Real in Madrid). Journalist Ruiz Coca reviews in his paper Ya:

"the commitment of the musicians was complete and the results highly promising mainly judging by the flexible musicality with which the conductor faces the instrumental set... homogenous, sharpened and unanimous sound... the extraordinary quality of the playing served the clear concepts the maestro has of the scores (which he conducts from memory) ... the happiest moment occurred in the Romantic Serenade by Dvorak, which Zumalave led with natural fluidity and security."

Antonio Fernandez-Cid, another respected Spanish critic for newspaper ABC, wrote:

"His conceptual approach is serious, but his baton flies... maestro Zumalave obtained admirable pianissimi and shades of sound from his orchestra... joyful version of the precious Mozart Divertimento K 138, and later a multitude of colours and detail in the Dvorak Serenade... Great success, culminated at the end of the concert with the beautiful Mozart Divertimento K 136, and after a standing ovation, with a short romantic page of L'Arlesíenne, sung very well by the mesmerised orchestra".

Of another remarkable concert, his presentation at the Auditorio Nacional in Madrid, Enrique Franco, music critic from El País, wrote:

"With a not at all populist or easy program, full of risky choices, maestro Zumalave made his debut conducting the National Orchestra of Spain. He is a sensible musician of great responsibility, a virtue made patently obvious in his interpretations of the Villa-Rojo premiere, and in Rachmaninov's Second, the latter an excellent version, the most detailed and conceptually transparent of the evening, and one which was rewarded by the public with a deserved standing ovation."

== Recordings ==
- Milladoiro: Iacobus Magnus, Ochestral Suite. The English Chamber Orchestra / Galicia Symphony Orchestra (in the piece "No cabo da viaxe"). Maximino Zumalave (director)
- Rodrigo Romani: "Albeida". The City of Prague Symphonic Orchestra. Maximino Zumalave (director)
- Amancio Prada : "Rosas a Rosalia". Royal Philharmonic Orchestra of Galicia, Maximino Zumalave (director).
- Musica Gallega. Stuttgart Chamber Orchestra, Maximino Zumalave (director). Herwig Zach (violin)
