= Aimo Pagin =

French pianist (born 1983)

Aimo Pagin is a French pianist, born in 1983. He trained under Rena Shereshevskaya (Strasbourg Conservatory), Dominique Merlet (Conservatoire de Paris) and Leon Fleisher (Peabody Institute). Pagin was prized at the 2005 Enescu Competition, and subsequently won the XI Premio Pianistico di Napoli. He has also been prized at the 2007 Cidade de Ferrol (2nd to Evgeny Starodubtsev) and Campillos (3rd prize) international competitions, both in Spain.

Pagin has performed internationally as a soloist and a chamber musician. In addition, he has served regularly as an accompanist for his mother, Silvia Marcovici.

Pagin played in Bucharest with the Philharmonic instead of Radu Lupu in March 2009 and was invited to play at the Tonhalle Zürich by David Zinman.
