= Diana Ionescu =

Romanian pianist

Diana Ionescu (born 1981 in Câmpina, Romania) is a Romanian pianist and First Prize Winner of the prestigious George Enescu International Piano Competition, in its 2001 Edition. She began studying the piano with Sanda Bobescu, a professor at the National Music Academy in Bucharest. She was also a pupil of Olga Szell at the Georges Ensecu Institute. She then entered Dan Grigore’s class at Bucharest’s National Music University, from which she graduated in 2003. She later trained under the guidance of Joan Havill at the Guildhall School of Music and Drama in London. She regularly performs in Europe and has given concerts in Romania, various other European countries (Austria, Belgium, Great Britain and Switzerland), Russia, Japan and the United States. She has recorded for Radio Bucharest, Radio France, Radio de la Suisse Romande, Russian National Radio and Romanian television.
