= Henry Zeffman =

British journalist

- Born: 1994 (age 31–32)
- Education: University of Oxford (BA)
- Occupation: Journalist
- Employer: BBC News
- Title: BBC Chief Political Correspondent
- Predecessor: Nick Eardley

Henry Zeffman is a British journalist, born 1994 working for BBC News, since 2023 as their Chief Political Correspondent. He was formerly employed by The Times as a political editor.

== Education ==
Zeffman was privately educated at Highgate School in London. He studied philosophy, politics and economics (PPE) at the University of Oxford where he was an organ scholar at Brasenose College, Oxford, and served as president of the junior common room in 2014, graduating in 2015 with an upper-second-class honours Bachelor of Arts degree.

=== Awards and honours ===
Zeffman won the 2015 Anthony Howard Award for Young Journalists, and Young Journalist of the Year at the 2019 National Press Awards.

== Personal life ==
Zeffman's brother Oliver Zeffman is a conductor, and his sister studied law. The pianist Solomon Cutner was a relative.

Media offices
Preceded by Nick Eardley	Chief Political Correspondent: BBC News; 2023–Present	Succeeded by Incumbent
