= Franco Abbiati =

Italian musicologist (1898–1981)

Franco Abbiati (14 September 1898 – 22 January 1981) was an Italian musicologist.

Abbiati was born in Bergamo. He studied composition at the musical high school in Turin. He worked as a music critic for the Corriere della Sera for thirty-six years.

The Franco Abbiati Prize is named after him.
