= Silvia Marcovici =

Romanian musician (born 1952)

Silvia Marcovici (born 30 January 1952) is a Romanian classical violinist.

Born in Bacău, Romania, to a Jewish family, she studied at the Conservatory in Bucharest. Her international debut was at the age of sixteen when she performed in The Hague under Bruno Maderna. In 1969, she won the second grand prize in the Marguerite Long-Jacques Thibaud Competition in Paris (nobody won the first one) as well as the special prize of Rainier III, Prince of Monaco. In 1970, she was the winner of the first prize in the George Enescu Competition in Bucharest. In 1972, she was invited by Leopold Stokowski to play the Glazunov Violin Concerto with the London Symphony Orchestra at the Royal Festival Hall, recorded by Decca.

Her discography includes Debussy, Franck, Fauré sonatas for Aurophon-Classics, the Sibelius Violin Concerto with Neeme Järvi and the Gothenburg Symphony for BIS. Also, the Tchaikovsky, Brahms, Beethoven, Saint-Saëns and Bruch 1st violin concertos and the Lalo Symphonie Espagnole with various orchestras, collected on a set of Doremi CDs.

She performs frequently in South and North America, Japan, Middle East and all over Europe Marcovici has been productive in chamber music. She appears often in recitals with famous pianists, and recently also with her son Aimo Pagin, himself a pianist.

She lives in Strasbourg (France) and Graz (Austria) where she is a professor at the University of Music and Performing Arts of Graz.
