= Josu de Solaun Soto =

Josu De Solaun
- Josu De Solaun, New York 2006

Background information
- Born: October 27, 1981 (age 44); Valencia, Spain
- Genres: Classical
- Occupations: Pianist
- Website: http://www.josudesolaun.com

Josu de Solaun (born October 27, 1981) is a Spanish-American classical music pianist, composer and conductor. He is also a solo piano free improviser, playing solo improvised piano recitals, as well as a published poet and a published composer. He holds citizenships from both Spain and the United States. In 2019 he was given the title of Officer of Cultural Merit, a state decoration, by Klaus Iohannis, president of Romania. In both 2021 and 2023 he was awarded an International Classical Music Awards (ICMA) Award, once for chamber music and once for solo playing.

== Biography ==
He is winner of the First Prize at the XIII George Enescu International Piano Competition, the First Prize at the I European Union Piano Competition held in Prague, and the First Grand Prize at the XV José Iturbi International Piano Competition. He is the first and only pianist from Spain to have ever been awarded the coveted prizes in the more than 30 and 50 years of their existence (the Iturbi and Enescu Competitions, founded in 1981 and 1958). From 1999 to 2019 he resided in the United States, until 2014 in New York City, and is a graduate of the Manhattan School of Music, from which he holds a Bachelor of Music, Master of Music and Doctorate in Musical Arts, and where his main teachers were Nina Svetlanova and Horacio Gutiérrez. He studied chamber music with violinist Isidore Cohen. From 2014 to 2018 he was Professor of Piano at Sam Houston State University. Since 2019 he resides in Madrid, Spain. In Spain, until the age of 17, his main teacher was Mexican pianist Maria Teresa Naranjo Ochoa.

He has performed as a soloist with orchestras such as the Spanish National Orchestra, Mariinsky Theatre Orchestra, Moscow Chamber Orchestra, Philharmonic Orchestra of Fenice, George Enescu Philharmonic Orchestra, National Symphony Orchestra of Colombia, RTÉ Concert Orchestra, Ploiești Philharmonic Orchestra, Transylvania State Philharmonic Orchestra, Janáček Philharmonic Orchestra, Moravian Philharmonic, Mexico City Philharmonic Orchestra, RTVE Symphony Orchestra, Moldova State Philharmonic Orchestra, Banatul Philharmonic of Timișoara, Orquesta Sinfónica de Galicia, Orquesta de Valencia, City of Granada Orchestra, Orquesta Filarmónica de Málaga, Bilbao Orkestra Sinfonikoa, Sioux City Symphony Orchestra, and under conductors such as Giancarlo Guerrero, Justus Frantz, Rumon Gamba, Gheorghe Costin, JoAnn Falletta, Constantine Orbelian, Ilarion Ionescu-Galaţi, Christian Badea, Theodore Kuchar, Erik Nielsen, Paul Daniel, Enrique García Asensio, Jean-Claude Casadesus, Laurence Equilbey, Rossen Milanov, Yaron Traub, Alexis Soriano, Miguel Ángel Gómez Martínez and Ramón Tebar.

== Recordings ==
He has recorded for Naxos Records, Audite, and IBS Classical, including the complete works for piano by George Enescu.

== Prizes ==
Year	Competition	Prize
2006	XV José Iturbi International Piano Competition (Valencia, Spain)	1st Prize
2009	Young Concert Artists (YCA) International Auditions (New York, United States)	2nd Prize
2009	I European Union Piano Competition (Prague/Ostrava, Czech Republic)	1st Prize
2013	VII Iowa International Piano Competition (Sioux City, Iowa, United States)	2nd Prize
2014	XIII George Enescu International Piano Competition (Bucharest, Romania)	1st Prize
