= Samson Tsoy =

Kazakh pianist

Samson Tsoy (born 24 October 1988) is a Kazakh pianist.

He was born in Kazakhstan, and moved to Russia in 1996. He trained at the Moscow Tchaikovsky Conservatory, and the Royal College of Music in London. As of 2024 he lives in London.

He won first prize at the 2015 Campillos International Piano Competition.

He often performs with his partner Pavel Kolesnikov.
