= Dora Deliyska =

Bulgarian concert pianist

- Born: 1980 (age 45–46); Pleven, Bulgaria
- Genre: Classical music
- Occupation: Pianist
- Years active: 1989–present

Dora Deliyska (Bulgarian: Дора Делийска; born 1980) is a Bulgarian concert pianist residing in Vienna, Austria.

== Biography ==
Deliyska was born in Pleven, Bulgaria in 1980. Beginning piano lessons at the age of five, she performed her first public concert four years later at nine.

Deliyska studied at the Oxana Yablonskaya Piano Institute in Castelnuovo di Garfagnana (Tuscany), Italy from 2008 to 2009. Since then, she has obtained a master's degree in performance from the prestigious University of Music and Performing Arts in Vienna (Universität für Musik und darstellende Kunst Wien) where she studied under Noel Flores, Jürg von Vintschger and Stefan Vladar.

== Discography ==
- 2009: Franz Liszt: Klavierwerke (Gramola 98853)
- 2010: Frédéric Chopin Franz Liszt: Balladen und Walzer (Gramola 98899)
- 2012: Doppelgänger: Franz Liszt Franz Schubert (Gramola 98931)
- 2013: Franz Schubert: Klavierwerke (Gramola 98969)
- 2014: Caprice Viennoise – Kreisler, Brahms, Ravel, Enescu. Luka Kusztrich (Violine), Dora Deliyska (Klavier) (CAPRICCIO)
- 2014: Meeresstille – letzte Sonaten. Beethoven, Schubert (Gramola 99018)
- 2014: Robert Schumann, Kreisleriana, Kinderszenen und Paganini-Etüden 3/1/2 (Gramola 99058)
- 2015: Danzas. Greg Anderson, Béla Bartók, Astor Piazzolla, Igor Stravinsky, Alberto Ginastera. Dora and friends. With Luca Monti (Klavier), Nora Romanoff-Schwarzberg (Viola), Yury Revich (Violine), Florian Willeitner (Violine), Georg Breinschmid (Bass) (Gramola 99099)
