= Samvel Tumanyan =

Armenian politician

Member of the National Assembly of Armenia
- In office 1999–2003

Personal details
- Born: 25 February 1949 (age 77) Yerevan, Armenia
- Party: People's Party; National Unity
- Education: Yerevan State University

Samvel Tumanyan (born 25 February 1949) is an Armenian politician. He attended Yerevan State University. Tumanyan served as a People's Party and National Unity member of the National Assembly of Armenia from 1999 to 2003. He was awarded the Order of Friendship of Peoples in 1986.
