= Samvel K. Shoukourian =

Armenian Computer scientist and engineer (born 1950)

- Born: August 18, 1950 (age 76); Yerevan
- Education: Yerevan Polytechnic Institute
- Occupations: Computer science and engineering

Samvel K. Shoukourian (Armenian: Սամվել Շուքուրյան, born August 18, 1950, in Yerevan) is an Armenian Computer scientist and engineer. Doctor of Science in Physics and Mathematics (1990), Professor (1993), academician of National Academy of Sciences of Armenia (1996),

== Biography ==
Samvel K. Shoukourian was born in Yerevan in the family of doctor, RA Honored Scientist Kim Shoukourian. In 1972 he graduated from Yerevan Polytechnic Institute. In 1972-1993 he worked at the Yerevan Computer Research and Development Institute, meanwhile, since 1977, at Yerevan State University. 1993-2007 he was the Head of the Chair of Algorithmic Languages, since 2007 - Head of the Department of Information Systems and Information Systems of the Information Technologies Research and Education Center. He has been Chief Scientific Advisor and Development Director in different international companies. Since 2000, he is directing the Department of Embedded Test and Repair at Virage Logic Corporation (USA) and since 2010, the same department at Synopsys, Inc (USA).

The main topics of his current research interests include testing of electronic devices and systems, formal models of distributed systems, information technologies and architectures for multimedia virtual environments.

== Awards ==
- Acknowledgment of Prime Minister of Armenia, 2009
- Silver Medal of the Exhibition of National Economic Achievement of the USSR, 1986
- RA state award, 2013
