= Rhapsodies, Op. 79 (Brahms) =

Piano pieces by Johannes Brahms

The Rhapsodies, Op. 79, for piano were written by Johannes Brahms in 1879 during his summer stay in Pörtschach, when he had reached the maturity of his career. They were inscribed to his friend, the musician and composer Elisabeth von Herzogenberg. At the suggestion of the dedicatee, Brahms reluctantly renamed the sophisticated compositions from "Klavierstücke" (piano pieces) to "rhapsodies".

Rhapsody in B minor – Op. 79 No. 1
Performed by Muriel Nguyen Xuan

Rhapsody in B minor – Op. 79 No. 1
Performed by Peter Bispham

- No. 1 in B minor. Agitato is the more extensive piece, with outer sections in sonata form enclosing a lyrical, nocturne-like central section in B major and with a coda ending in that key.
- No. 2 in G minor. Molto passionato, ma non troppo allegro is a more compact piece in conventional sonata form.

In each piece, the main key is not definitely established until fairly late in the exposition.
