= Pavel Kolesnikov =

Russian pianist

Pavel Kolesnikov (Па́вел Коле́сников) (born 25 February 1989) is a Russian pianist and chamber musician.

== Life ==
Born in Novosibirsk, Kolesnikov, the son of scientists, began learning the piano and violin at the age of six. In 2004, at the age of 15, he went to the Novosibirsk State Conservatory, where he studied with Mary Lebenzon until 2007. Later, he continued his piano studies at the Moscow State Conservatory with Nikolai Lugansky. He has also taken part in master classes with Dmitri Bashkirov, Stephen Kovacevich, Emile Naumoff, Renaud Capuçon, Christian Frank, Mario delli Ponti and has performed in Italy, Spain, Great Britain, Poland and Germany. He lives in London which he describes as a 'perfect place for himself' with his partner, Kazakh pianist Samson Tsoy. The couple are also regular duet concert partners.

Kolesnikov has won several first prizes at various competitions, including the "Concours de Piano" in Andorra (2001), the "Gilels Piano Competition" in Odessa (2006) and the "Delia Steinberg Piano Competition" in Madrid. He has won prizes at more than 15 international competitions including the Honens International Piano Competition in 2012. In 2005 and 2006 he took part in the "Casalmaggiore International Festival" in Italy, in the Verbier Festival (2007, 2009) and at the international youth music festival "ArsLonga" in Moscow. In 2007, he was awarded the "Young Talent of Russia" in Moscow. In October 2011, Kolesnikov won the third prize and the audience prize at the international Kissinger Klavierolymp piano competition.
