= Six Pieces for Piano, Op. 118 (Brahms) =

1893 set of piano pieces by Johannes Brahms

No. 2: Intermezzo in A major
Performed by Carlos Gardels

No. 3: Ballade in G minor

No. 6: Intermezzo in E♭ minor
Nos. 3 & 6: digital piano capture

Johannes Brahms's Six Pieces for Piano, Op. 118, were completed in 1893 in Bad Ischl and published with a dedication to Clara Schumann. The set was the penultimate of Brahms's published works.

The pieces are frequently performed. Like Brahms's other late keyboard works, Op. 118 is more introspective than his earlier piano pieces, which tend to be more virtuosic in character. The six pieces are:

1. Intermezzo in A minor. Allegro non assai, ma molto appassionato
2. Intermezzo in A major. Andante teneramente
3. Ballade in G minor. Allegro energico
4. Intermezzo in F minor. Allegretto un poco agitato
5. Romanze in F major. Andante
6. Intermezzo in E♭ minor. Andante, largo e mesto
