= Three Intermezzi for piano, Op. 117 (Brahms) =

1892 piano pieces by Johannes Brahms

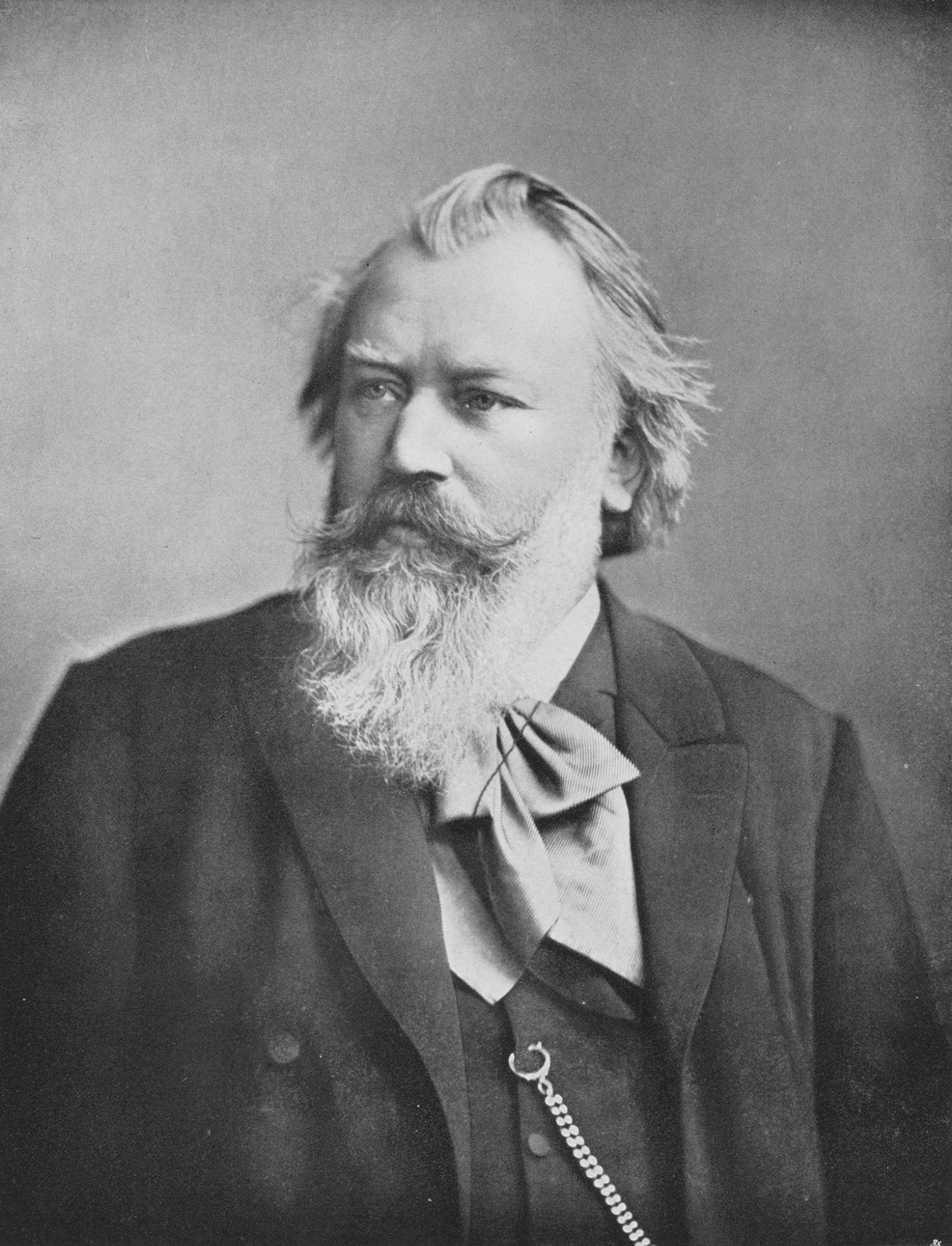
Brahms in 1889

The Three Intermezzi for piano, Op. 117, are a set of solo piano pieces composed by Johannes Brahms in 1892. They show Brahms's interest in lullaby; in particular, Brahms told a friend that they were "three lullabies of my grief". They consist of:

1. Intermezzo in E♭ major. Andante moderato
2. Intermezzo in B♭ minor. Andante non troppo e con molto espressione
3. Intermezzo in C♯ minor. Andante con moto

The first intermezzo is among Brahms's most popular piano compositions. It is prefaced in the score by two lines from an anonymous Scottish ballad, "Lady Anne Bothwell's Lament", translated to German by Johann Gottfried Herder:

Schlaf sanft mein Kind, schlaf sanft und schön!
Mich dauert’s sehr, dich weinen sehn.

Original:
Baloo, my babe, lie still and sleep;
It grieves me sore to see thee weep.

== History ==
1. Andante moderato

2. Andante non troppo e con molto espressione

3. Andante con moto

Brahms composed the three Intermezzi of Opus 117 in the summer of 1892 while staying in Bad Ischl. In June of that year he asked his friend, the musicologist Eusebius Mandyczewski, to send him manuscript paper so that Brahms could "properly sketch" the three pieces. In September 1892 Clara Schumann learned of the pieces' existence from her student Ilona Eibenschütz and wrote to Brahms requesting he send them to her. He sent her the completed pieces on 14 October 1892.

== Reception ==
These character pieces were described by the critic Eduard Hanslick as "monologues". Brahms's biographer Walter Niemann calls them "thoroughly personal and subjective", striking a "pensive, graceful, dreamy, resigned, and elegiac note".

To Niemann, the middle section of the second intermezzo seems to portray a "man as he stands with the bleak, gusty autumn wind eddying round him".
