= Joaquín Soriano =

Spanish pianist

Joaquín Soriano (born in León, 1941 died 26 July 2025) was a Spanish pianist.

Trained in Valencia, he was a disciple of Vlado Perlemuter at the Conservatoire National de Paris. He won the 1965 Viotti Competition in Vercelli and the XI Premio de Jaén (1966); an international concert career ensued.

Soriano holds a professorship at the Madrid Conservatory since 1972 and is the José Iturbi Competition's artistic director. He is a member of the Real Academia de Bellas Artes de San Fernando since 1988, and has been decorated with the Medalla de Oro al Mérito en las Bellas Artes and the Ordre des Arts et des Lettres.

== Bibliography ==
- Joaquín Soriano, en la Academia de Bellas Artes - El País, November 6, 1988
- Boletín Oficial del Estado - January 13, 1998
- Fundación Juan March
