= Poplawski =

Poplawski, Popławski (feminine: Popławska; plural: Popławscy) or Poplavsky is a Polish surname. Notable people include:

- Artur Popławski (1860–1918), Polish chess master
- Joe Poplawski (born 1957), Canadian football receiver
- Jan Ludwik Popławski (1854–1908), Polish publicist and politician
- Nikodem Popławski (born 1975), Polish theoretical physicist
- Radosław Popławski (born 1983), Polish long-distance runner
- Richard Poplawski (born 1986), the perpetrator of the 2009 shooting of Pittsburgh police officers
- Robert Poplawski (1886–1953), French law professor
- Stanislav Poplavsky (1902–1973), a general in the Soviet and Polish armies
- Mykhailo Poplavskyi (born 1949), Ukrainian singer and politician
