= Svenska Dagbladet =

Swedish newspaper

- Svenska Dagbladet front page, 10 June 2011
- Type: Daily newspaper
- Format: Tabloid
- Owner: Schibsted
- Editor-in-chief: Lisa Irenius
- Founded: 18 December 1884; 141 years ago
- Political alignment: Independent Moderate Party (liberal conservative)
- Language: Swedish
- Headquarters: Västra Järnvägsgatan 21, Stockholm
- Circulation: 164,900 (2017)
- ISSN: 1101-2412
- Website: www.svd.se

Svenska Dagbladet (Swedish: [ˈsvɛ̂nːska ˈdɑ̂ːɡˌblɑːdɛt], "The Swedish Daily News"), abbreviated SvD, is a daily newspaper published in Stockholm, Sweden.

== History and profile ==
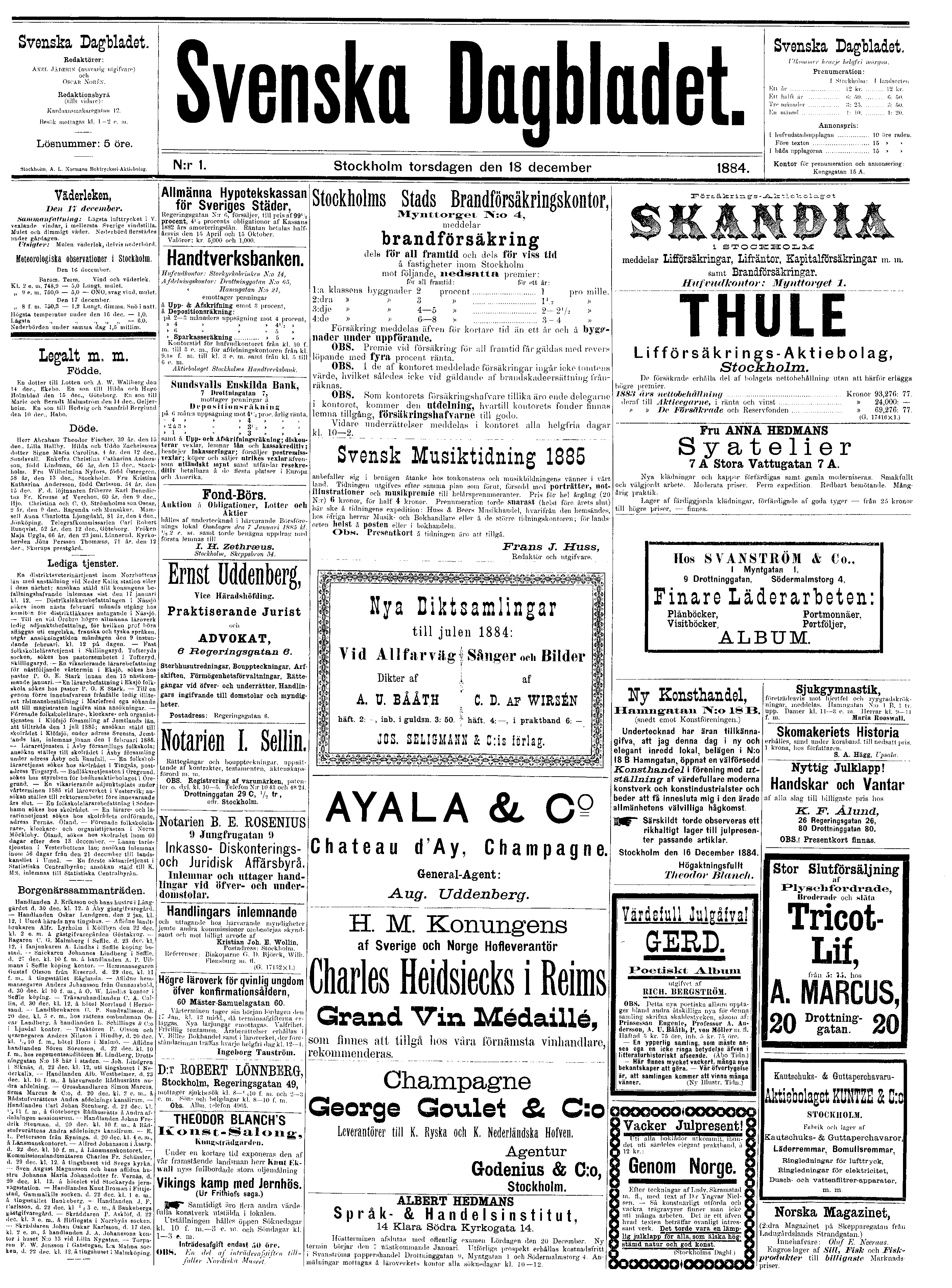
Front page of the first issue of Svenska Dagbladet (18 December 1884)

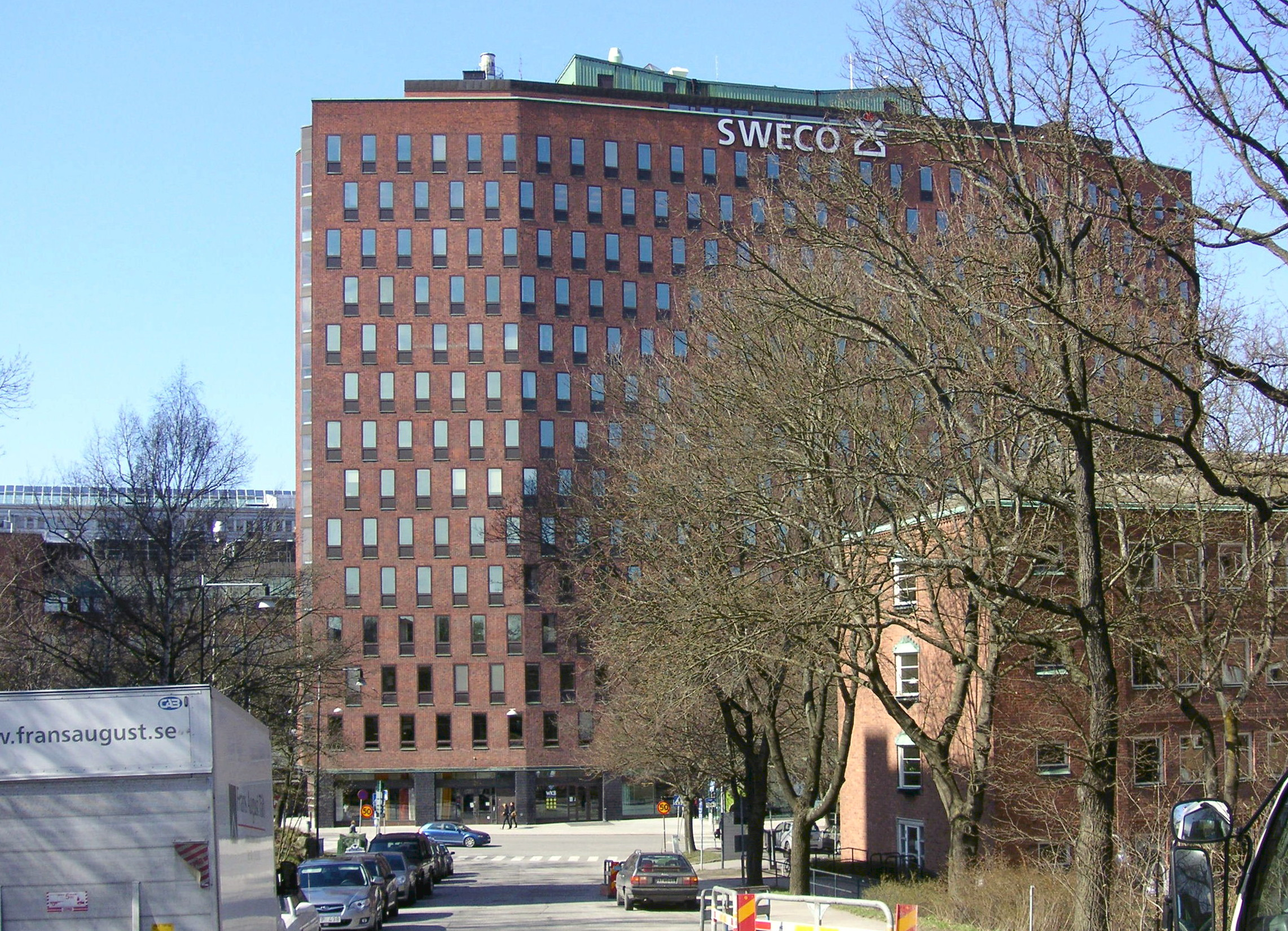
Anders Tengbom, building for Svenska Dagbladet in Stockholm

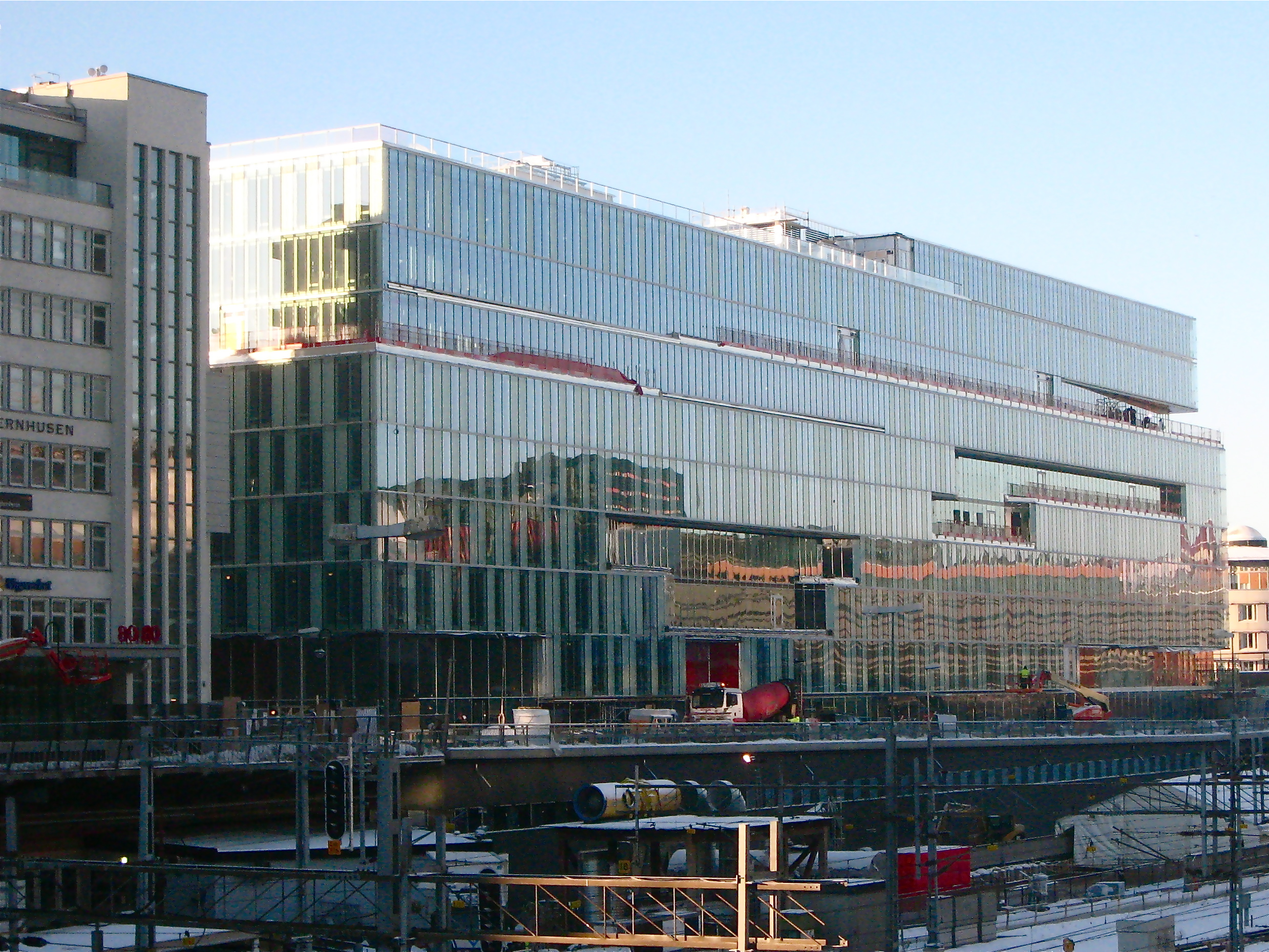
Kungsbrohuset: Buildings in the Norrmalm district

The first issue of Svenska Dagbladet appeared on 18 December 1884. During the beginning of the 1900s the paper was one of the right-wing publications in Stockholm. Ivar Anderson is among its former editors-in-chief who assumed the post in 1940. The same year Svenska Dagbladet was sold by Trygger family to the Enterprise Fund which had been established by fourteen Swedish businessmen to secure the ownership of the paper.

The paper is published in Stockholm and provides coverage of national and international news as well as local coverage of the Greater Stockholm region. Its subscribers are concentrated in the capital, but it is distributed in most of Sweden. The paper was one of the critics of the Prime Minister Olof Palme, and in December 1984 it asked him to resign from the office following his interview published in Hufvudstadsbladet.

Svenska Dagbladet is owned by Schibsted which purchased it in the late 1990s. The stated position of the editorial page is "independently moderate" (oberoende moderat), which means it is independent but adheres to the liberal conservatism of the Moderate Party. Despite this position, the paper is also regarded as conservative.

In November 2000 Svenska Dagbladet changed its format from broadsheet to tabloid. In 2005 the paper started a Web portal for business news as a joint venture with Aftonbladet.

Since 1925 Svenska Dagbladet has awarded an individual sportsperson or a team the Svenska Dagbladet Gold Medal at the end of each year.

As the only other Swedish morning newspaper to aspire to full national and international coverage, Svenska Dagbladet is the chief rival of Dagens Nyheter.

Anna Careborg was appointed acting CEO and Editor-in-chief in January 2019, taking over from Fredric Karén, who is now working with Torstar Group, owners of the Toronto Star, in Canada.

Careborg took over fully as new CEO and Editor-in-chief of Svenska Dagbladet in October 2019.

== Circulation ==
The circulation of Svenska Dagbladet was 185,000 copies in 2003. The paper had a circulation of 187,100 copies on weekdays in 2005. Among Swedish morning newspapers, Svenska Dagbladet had the third largest circulation with 195,200 copies in 2007 after Dagens Nyheter and Göteborgs-Posten. In 2008 Svenska Dagbladet had a circulation of 123,383 copies. The circulation of the paper was 185,600 copies in 2011. It was 159,600 copies in 2012 and declined to 143,400 copies in 2013.

== Staff ==
- Gunilla Asker, appointed CEO of Svenska Dagbladet (2009)
- Cordelia Edvardson, Jerusalem correspondent for Svenska Dagbladet from 1977 to 2006
- Carolina Neurath, economic journalist
- Märta Lindqvist, film critic
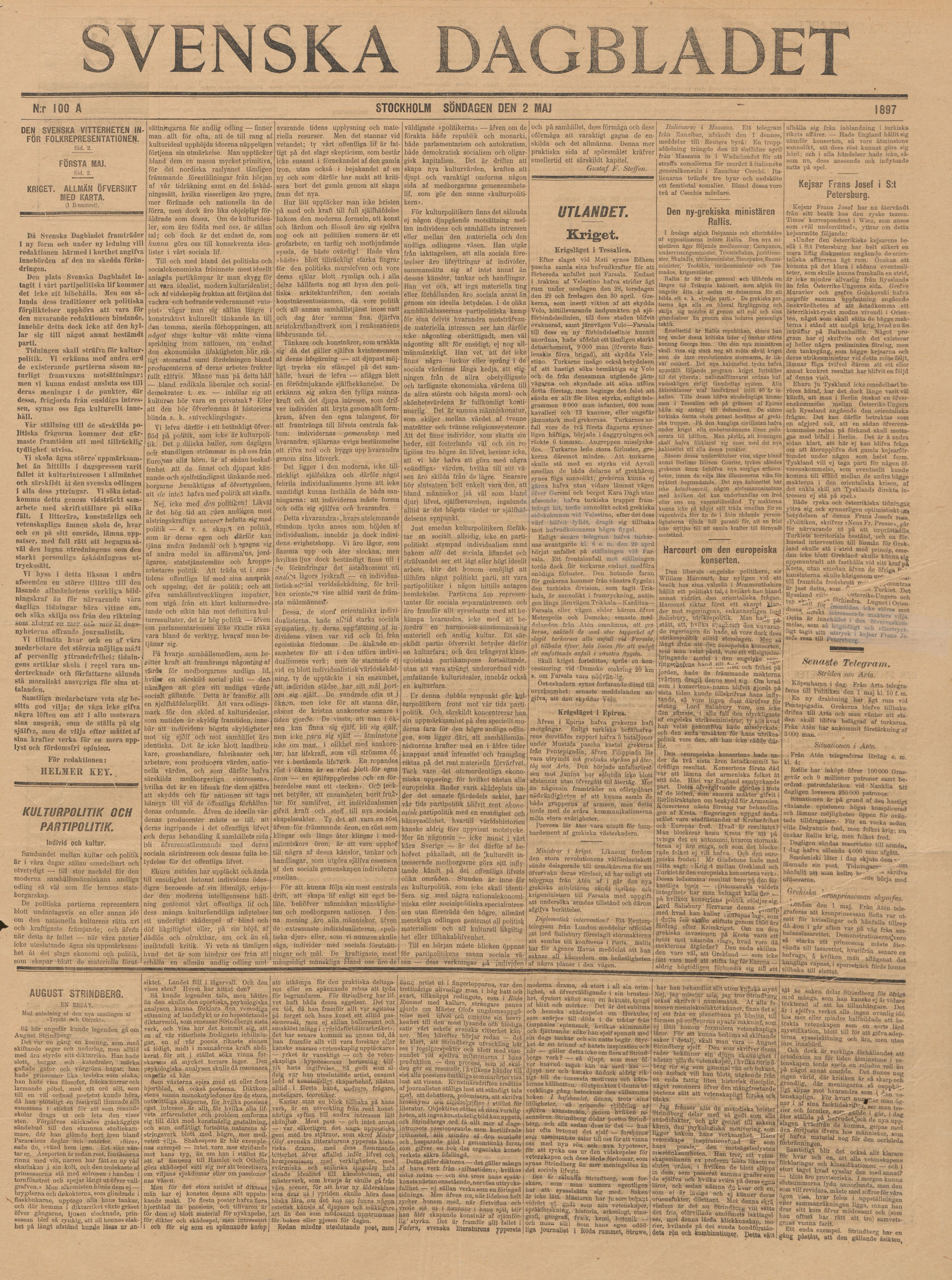
Svenska Dagbladet, Sunday, 2 May 1897. The first issue under new management, new format and new header. The first page contains signed contributions by Helmer Key (1864–1939), Gustaf F. Steffen (1864–1929) and Oscar Levertin (1862–1906).

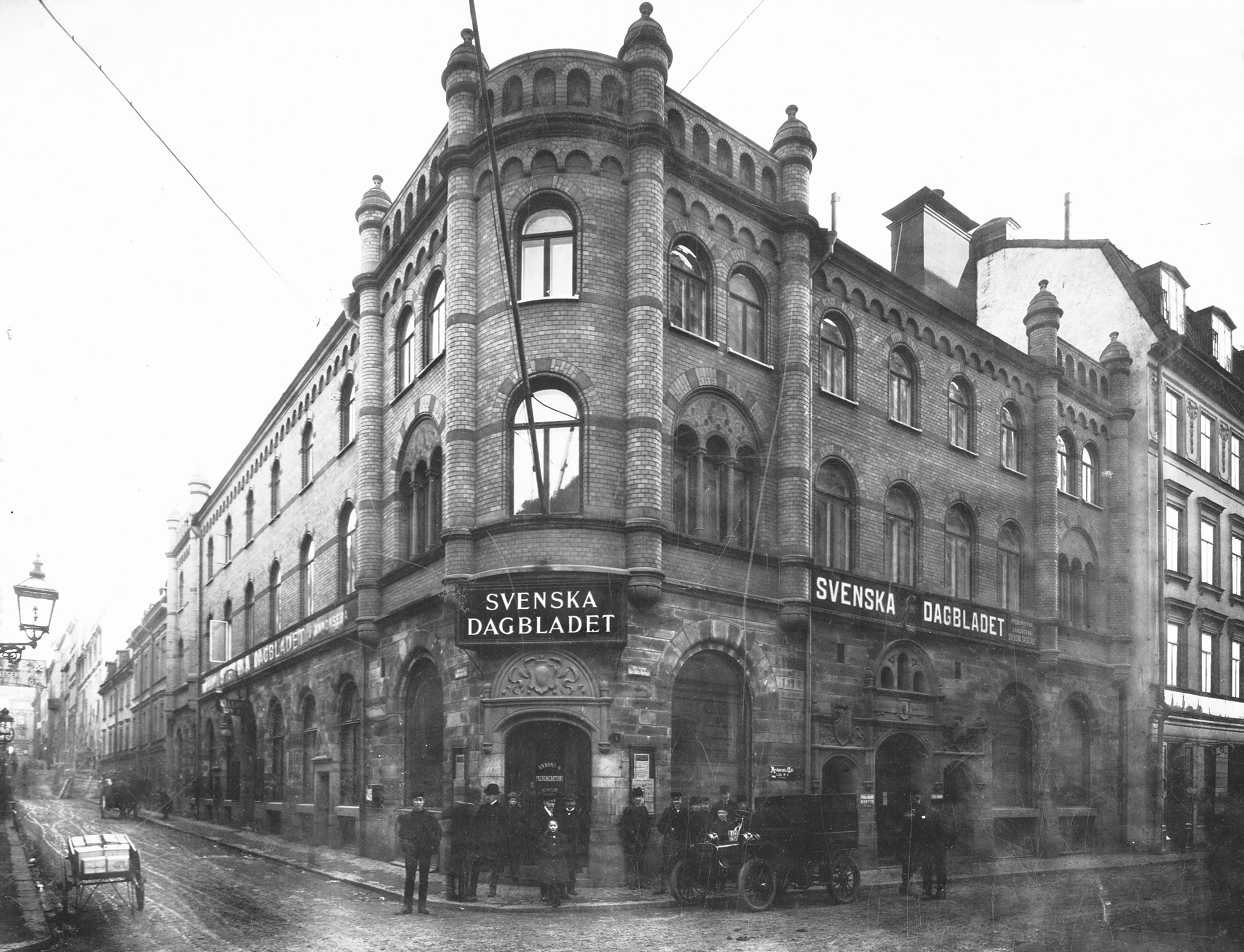
Svenska Dagbladet's editorial house at Karduansmakargatan 13 / Klara Södra Kyrkogata in the Loen block. Architects Ullrich & Hallquist. Year built 1897

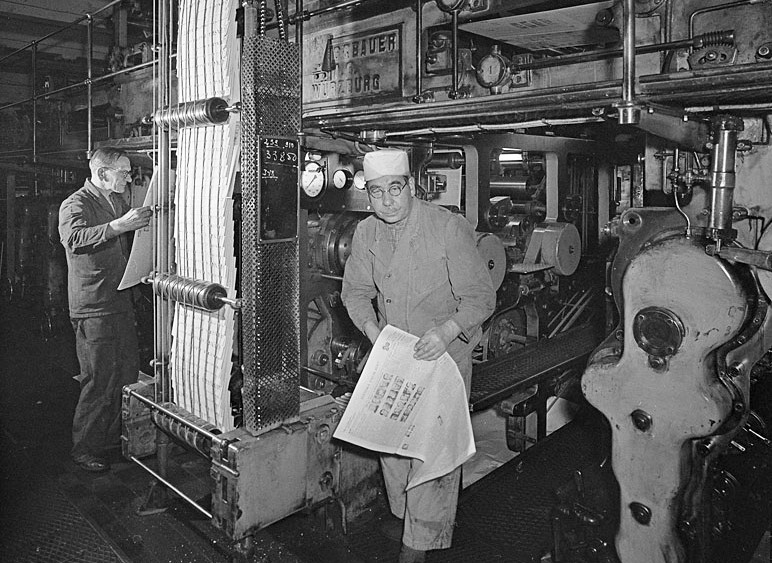
Svenska Dagbladets printing shop at Karduansmakargatan in Klarakvarteren in 1951

== See also ==
- List of Swedish newspapers
- Svenska Utlandstidningen
