= Palais Rohan =

Palais Rohan may refer to:

- Palais Rohan, Bordeaux
- Palais Rohan, Strasbourg
