= Jean Michel Larrasket =

French professor and engineer

Jean-Michel Larrasket
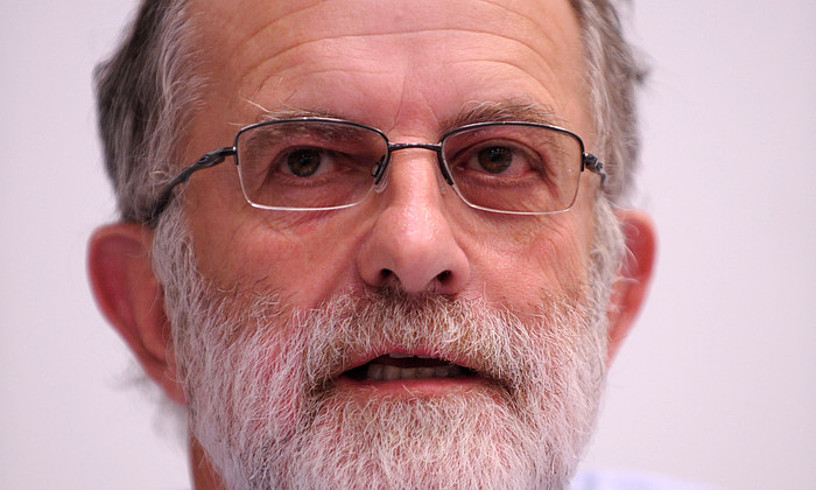
- In 2018
- Born: Jean-Michel Larrasquet; 22 May 1950; Paris, France
- Died: 19 March 2018 (aged 67); Bayonne, France
- Education: Mondragon University. University of Pau and Pays de l'Adour. University of Toulouse
- Occupations: Engineer and academic

Jean-Michel Larrasket (Basque: Larrasket, French: Larrasquet) (22 May 1950 – 19 March 2018), was a French professor and engineer, as well as vice president for the French Basque Country in the Basque Studies Society. He was a promoter of several projects for the social and economic development of the French Basque Country, and he was also one of the founders of the Eticoop cooperative that promotes entrepreneurship in this geographical area.

== Biography ==
Larrasket's parents were from the town of Barcus in Zuberoa, and consequently Larrasket always kept a close relationship with the town. He studied engineering in Toulouse and at the beginning of the 80s he started as a professor at the IUT in Bayonne. Ten years later he became a professor at the ESTIA School (School of Advanced Industrial Technology of Bidarte and Biarritz) and in the school of Business of the Mondragón University. In his lasts years, before retiring, he was professor in the University of Pau and Pays de l'Adour.

He was also a member of the Basque Summer University, where in 1986 in Pamplona he delivered an inaugural speech with the title of "New technologies and Euskera in the northern Basque Country".

In 2012, he became vice president for the French Basque Country in the Basque Studies Society, a position he would hold until his death.
