= Itxaro Borda =

Basque writer

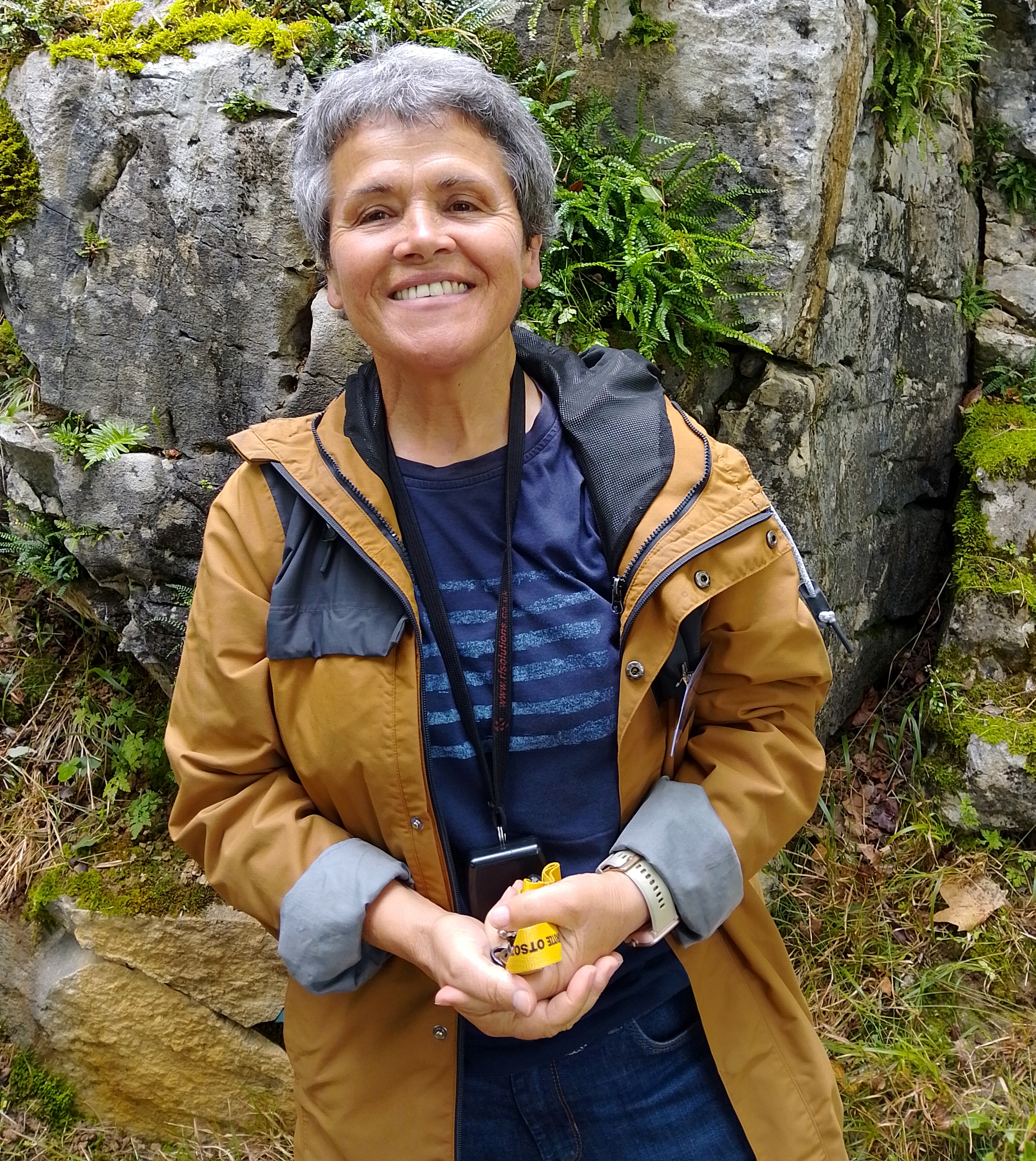
- Itxaro Borda (2024)
- Born: Itxaro Borda Xarriton; 29 March 1959 (age 67); Bayonne, France
- Education: University of Pau and the Adour Region
- Occupation: writer
- Writing career
- Genres: poetry; novels; essays; translations
- Notable work: 100% Basque
- Notable awards: Euskadi Prize

Itxaro Borda Xarriton (Bayonne, 29 March 1959) is a French writer in Basque language. In 2002, she was the recipient of the Euskadi Prize for her novel, 100% Basque.

== Early life and education ==
She spent her early life in the Lower Navarre village of Orègue.

She obtained a professional baccalaureate degree in agricultural at the Jean-Errecart high school in Saint-Palais, Pyrénées-Atlantiques. She later obtained a Diplôme d'études approfondies (diploma of advanced studies) in history at the University of Pau and the Adour Region.

== Career ==
She worked at the post office, for a time in Paris and then in Mauléon-Licharre, before relocating to Bayonne.

She published her first poem in 1974 in the magazine Herria. In 1981–82, she co-founded the Basque-French magazine Maiatz, with Lucien Etxezaharreta. It facilitated the publication of her first collection of poems, Bizitza nola badoan, in 1984.

In addition to poetry, she has written novels, articles and essays. She has translated works such as The Caucasian Chalk Circle by Bertolt Brecht into Basque. She has also written lyrics for songs.

=== Amaia Ezpeldoi ===
The best-known character in Borda's noir fiction work is Amaia Ezpeldoi, an atypical, rural, bisexual, and communication-challenged Souletine detective who first appears in the novel Bakean ützi arte, from 1994, and later in Bizi nizano munduan and Amorezko pena baño, both from 1996, forming a first trilogy. In these three works, she deals with Souletine themes, such as the gas industry or the production of esparto grass, as well as the socioeconomic and cultural situation of the French Basque Country. In 2004, she brought back this character in Jalgi hadi plazara, although the setting of this novel is Bilbao, Spain. In 2012, she published a fifth novel starring Ezpeldoi, Boga boga.

== Awards and honours ==
In 2002, she received the Premios Euskadi de Literatura prize in the "Basque-language literature" category for her novel % 100 basque.

== Selected works ==
=== Poetry collections ===
- Bizitza nola badoan (Tal y como va la vida); 1984, Maiatz
- Krokodil bat daukat bihotzaren ordez (Tengo un cocodrilo en lugar de un corazón); 1986, Susa
- Just love; 1988, Maiatz
- Bestaldean (Al otro lado); 1991, Susa
- Orain (Ahora); 1998, Susa
- Entre les loups cruels; 2001, Maiatz
- Hautsak errautsak bezain (El polvo al igual que la ceniza); 2002, Maiatz

=== Novels ===
- Basilika (La basílica); 1985, Susa
- Udaran betaurreko beltzekin (En verano con gafas negras); 1987, Ateka
- Bakean ützi arte (Hasta que nos dejen en paz); 1994, Susa
- Bizi nizano munduan (En el mundo que vivía); 1996, Susa
- Amorezko pena baño (Más que pena de amor); 1996, Susa
- %100 Basque (100% Basque); 2002, Susa
- Zeruetako Erresuma (El reino de los cielos); 2005, Susa
- Jalgi hadi plazara (Sal a la plaza); 2007, Susa
- Ezer gabe hobe (Mejor sin nada); 2009, Susa
- Boga boga; 2012, Susa

=== Essays ===
- Emakumeak idazle, 1984, Txertoa
- Hiruko, 2003, Alberdania
- Ces lieux qui nous racontent le Pays basque, 2018, Artza éditions

=== Translations ===
- Bertold Brecht. Kaukasiar kreazko borobila. 2006, Artezblai
- María Mercé Marçal (Poesía Kaiera). 2014, Susa

=== Narrations ===
- Entre les loups cruels, 2001, Maiatz (bilingual Basque and French)
