= Richard Chbeir =

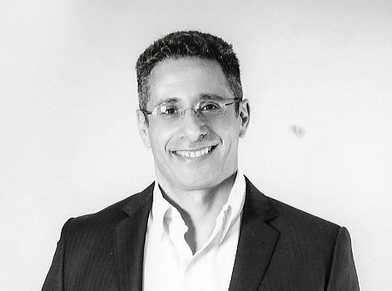
- Chbeir in 2020
- Education: University of Burgundy; Institut national des sciences appliquées de Lyon
- Scientific career
- Fields: Computer science Data management Data semantics
- Workplaces: University of Pau and the Adour Region

Richard Chbeir is a professor of computer science at the University of Pau and the Adour Region in France, where he leads the computer science laboratory called LIUPPA. He is the director of the Semantics & Privacy in Digital Ecosystems Research group (SPiDER). He is currently working on information and knowledge extraction.

Chbeir is the head of the OpenCEMS industrial chair and is the creator of the MEDES Conference.

Chbeir received his Ph.D. in computer science from the Institut national des sciences appliquées de Lyon in 2001 and got his habilitation degree in 2010 from the University of Burgundy.

== Selected publications ==
- Joe Tekli, Richard Chbeir, Agma J. M. Traina, Caetano Traina Jr.:SemIndex+: A semantic indexing scheme for structured, unstructured, and partly structured data. Knowl. Based Syst. 164: 378-403(2019)
- Irvin Dongo, Richard Chbeir: RiAiR: A Framework for Sensitive RDF Protection. J. Web Eng. 18(1-3): 43-96 (2019)
- Fekade Getahun, Richard Chbeir: Multi-Query Optimization on RSS Feeds. J. Data Semant. 7(1): 47-64 (2018)
- Elie Raad, Richard Chbeir, Albert Dipanda, Eliana J. Raad: Automatic rule generation using crowdsourcing for better relationship type discovery. Pervasive Mob. Comput. 36: 80-97 (2017)
- Elie Raad, Bechara al Bouna, Richard Chbeir: Preventing sensitive relationships disclosure for better social media preservation. Int. J. Inf. Sec. 15(2): 173-194 (2016)

== Published books ==
- Emergent Web Intelligence: Advanced Information Retrieval by Springer in 2010
- Emergent Web Intelligence: Advanced Semantic Technologies by Springer in 2010
- Security and Privacy Preserving in Social Networks by Springer in 2013
- Artificial Intelligence Applications and Innovations by Springer in 2015
- Advanced Internet Based Systems and Applications by Springer in 2009
- Signal Processing for Image Enhancement and Multimedia Processing Springer in 2008
