= Françoise Deslogères =

French ondist (1929–2020)

Françoise Deslogères (9 May 1929 – 20 September 2020) was a French ondist.

== Life and career ==
Françoise Deslogères was born in Boulogne-Billancourt on 9 May 1929. She studied music (harmony, piano) with Henri Challan, Geneviève Joy and Jeanne Blancard. She began working on the ondes Martenot in 1957 with inventor Maurice Martenot. In 1968 she founded a trio for ondes Martenot, piano and percussions, the Trio Deslogères. From 1971, she taught the ondes Martenot in Boulogne-Billancourt and at the Université de Pau et des Pays de l'Adour. Deslogères died in Boulogne-Billancourt on 20 September 2020, at the age of 91.

== Premieres ==
- De Voci (1958), Pièces de chair (1967) by Sylvano Bussotti
- Concerto (1966) by Raymond Depraz.
- Points de rencontre (1977) by Charles Chaynes

== Sources ==
- Alain Pâris: Dictionnaire des interprètes Bouquins/Laffont 1989 p. 320
