= University of Pau and the Adour Region =

Multi-site public university in France

Coordinates: 43°18′54″N 00°21′58″W

- Université de Pau et des Pays de l'Adour
- Motto: L'Université est une chance. Saisissons-la! (University is an opportunity. Let's take it!)
- Type: Public
- Established: 1970; 56 years ago
- Affiliations: Academy of Bordeaux
- President: Laurent Bordes
- Vice-president: Monique Luby-Gaucher; Nadiar Mekouar-Hertzbrg; Isabelle Bareille
- Faculty: 1017
- Administrative staff: 682
- Students: 13,841
- Doctoral students: 584
- Location: Université de Pau - 64000 Pau, France, Aquitaine Region (Pau, Bayonne, Mont de Marsan), Midi-Pyrénées Region (Tarbes), France
- Campus: Pau, Bayonne, Anglet, Tarbes (Hautes Pyrénées), Mont de Marsan (Landes)
- Website: http://www.univ-pau.fr/ (in French)

The University of Pau and the Adour Region (French: L'Université de Pau et des Pays de l'Adour, or UPPA) is a multi-site, public university located in southwestern France. Founded in 1972, it is based in Pau (département of Pyrénées-Atlantiques) but also in Anglet, Bayonne, Tarbes and Mont-de-Marsan in the Adour river basin. Coming administratively under the Academy of Bordeaux, it is the third largest university in southwestern France (after Bordeaux and Toulouse), with almost 14,000 students.

== Organisation ==
=== History ===
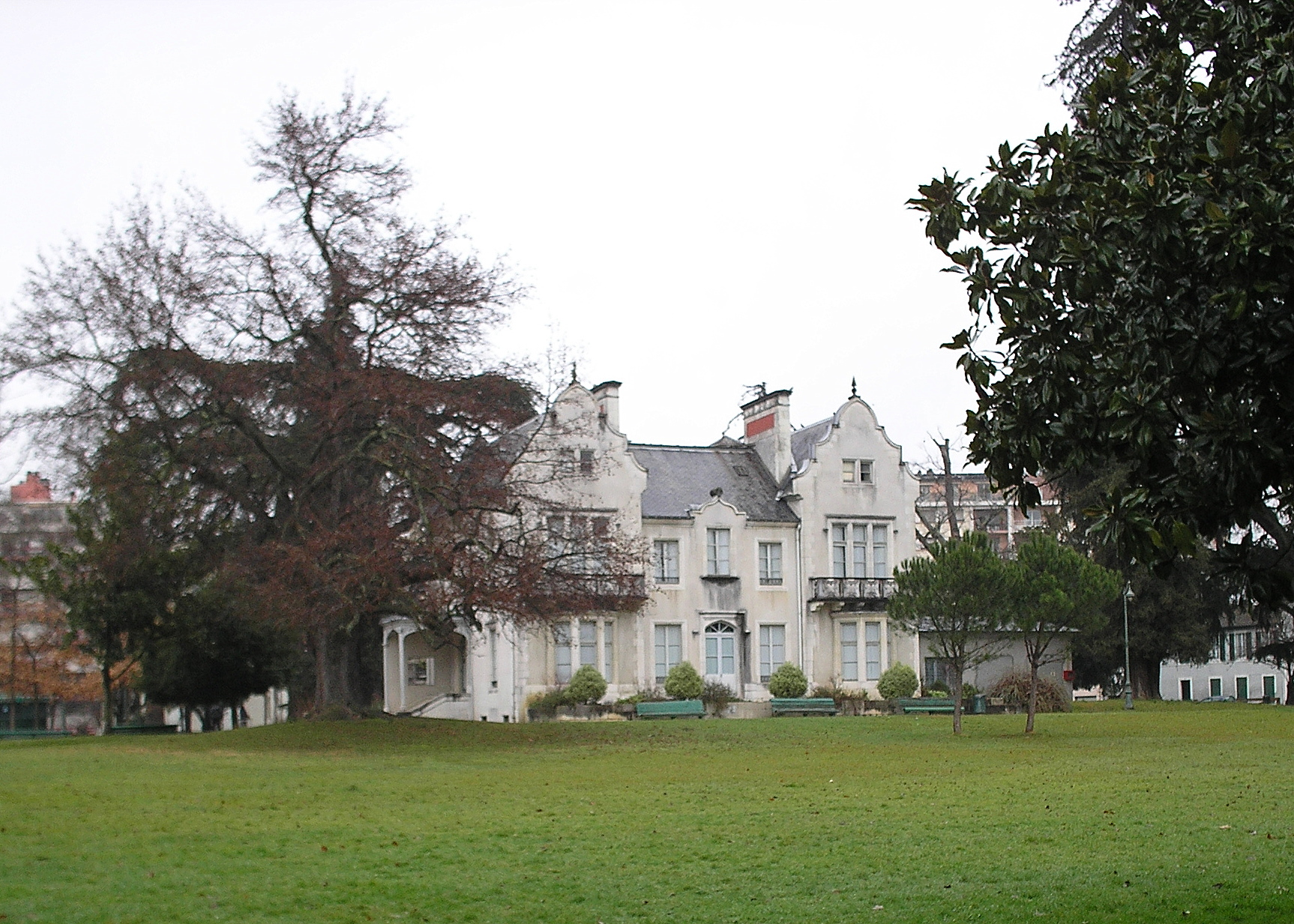
Villa Lawrence

The university was formally established in 1970. However, it can trace its origins back to 1549 when the Collège des Arts, an institute for the study of the humanities, was established in the royal town of Pau. More recently, the University of Bordeaux opened a branch in Pau in 1946 to teach legal subjects. This branch known as the Institut d'études juridiques et économiques was directed by Robert Poplawski. It was then located in Villa Lawrence in Pau town centre.

=== Presidents ===
The university has been led by the following presidents:

- 2021– : Laurent Bordes - mathematician
- 2012–2020 : Mohamed Amara - mathematician
- 2008–2012 : Jean-Louis Gout - mathematician
- 2004–2008 : Jean-Michel Uhaldeborde - economist
- 1998–2004 : Jean-Louis Gout - mathematician
- 1993–1998 : Claude Laugénie (1938–2008) - geographer; created the IRSAM and directed the Centre d'Initiation à l'Enseignement Supérieur Aquitaine-Outremer
- 1988–1993 : Jean-Louis Gout - mathematician
- 1982–1988: Franck Métras - chemist
- 1976–1982 : Daniel Levier - English studies
- 1973–1976 : Jean Deschamps (professeur) (1925-1998) - chemist
- 1970–1973 : Maurice Descotes (1923-2000) - novelist and literature specialist

== Academics ==
As the university has grown it has added more courses and reorganised its academic units. In 2018, the academic units were organised into three colleges:

- College of European and International Studies (EEI)
  - includes the Department of Interdisciplinary Studies at the Bayonne campus and the Institute of Enterprise Administration (IAE)
  - located on two campuses: Pau and Bayonne.
- College of Social Sciences and Humanities (SSH)
  - fusion of the Department of Letters, Languages, Human Sciences and Sport and the Department of Law, Economics and Management
  - located on two campuses: Pau and Tarbes.
- College of Sciences and Technologies for Energy and the Environment (STEE)
  - includes the Department of Sciences and Techniques, several specialist units and two University Institutes of Technology (IUT)
  - located on four campuses: Pau, Bayonne, Anglet et Mont-de-Marsan.

== Research ==
Research in the university is promoted in five thematic areas:

- Adapting coastal ecosystems, forests, mountains to make them more resilient
- Reconciling development, secure environment and preserved biodiversity
- Organising energy subsidiarity at territorial level.
- Questioning borders and taking up the challenge of differences.
- Representing and building the territories of the future.

For the period 2021–2026, research has been organised into a number of interdisciplinary centres located in each of the three Colleges:

- College of Social Sciences and Humanities (SSH)
  - ALTER - Arts/Languages : Transitions and Relations - UR 7504
  - ITEM - Identities, Territories, Expressions, Mobilities - UR 3002
  - MEPS - Laboratory of Movement, Equilibrium, Performance and Health - UR 4445
  - IFTJ - Institute of Research on Legal Transitions - UR
  - TREE - Energy and Environmental Transitions
- College of European and International Studies (EEI)
  - CDRE - Centre for Documentation and European Research - UR 3004
  - LIREM - Laboratory for Management Research - UR 4580
  - IKER - Centre for Basque Language and Text Research - UMR 5478
- College of Sciences and Technologies for Energy and the Environment (STEE)
  - ECOBIOP - Behavioral Ecology and Biology of Fish Populations - UMR 1224
  - IPREM - Institute of Analytical Sciences and Physical Chemistry for the Environment and Materials - UMR 5254
  - LFCR - Laboratory of Complex Fluids - UMR 5150
  - LIUPPA - Computer Science Laboratory - UR 3000
  - LMAP - Laboratory of Mathematics and their Applications - UMR 5142
  - NUMEA - Nutrition, Metabolism and Aquaculture - UMR 1419
  - SIAME - Laboratory of Mechanical and Electrical engineering - UR 4581

== Facilities ==
=== Pau campus ===
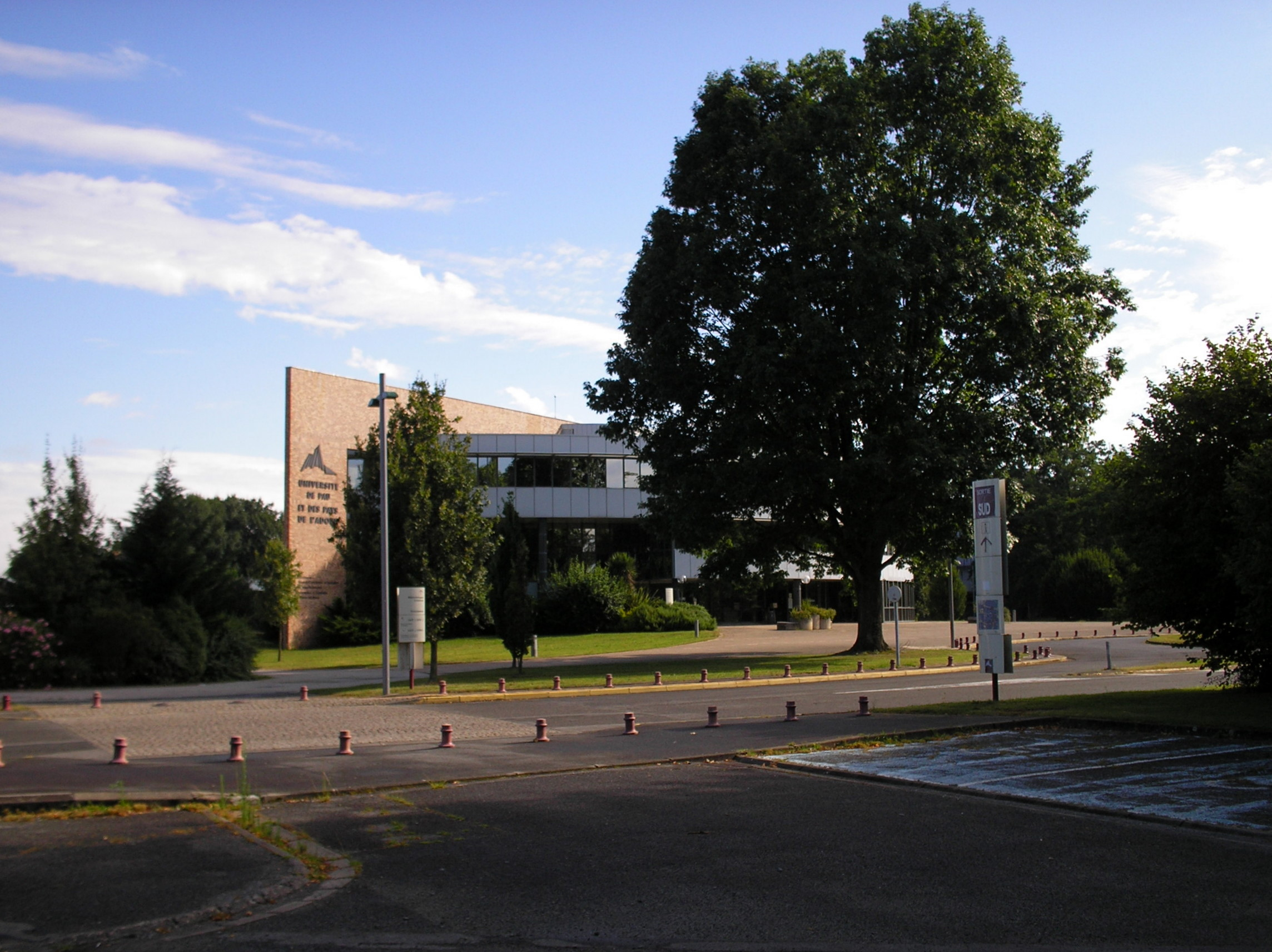
Présidence building viewed from a South-West position (parking sud)

The main campus of the university is located in a large park in the north of the city of Pau, about twenty minutes ride from the town centre, but within the urban limits. The President's office is located there in the Présidence (Presidency) semicircular building. The campus is bounded by Avenue de l'Université-Cours Léon Bérard-Boulevard Tourasse to the South, Avenue du Doyen Poplawski to the West, rue Audrey Benghozi and Boulevard Lucien Favre to the North and Allées Condorcet to the East.

There are facilities for all three colleges on the campus. the Ecole Nationale Supérieure en Génie de Technologies Industrielles (ENSGTI) and a School for Business Administration (Institut d'Administration des Entreprises) There are two specialised university libraries, one for the Sciences Department, the other common to the Law and Arts Departments.

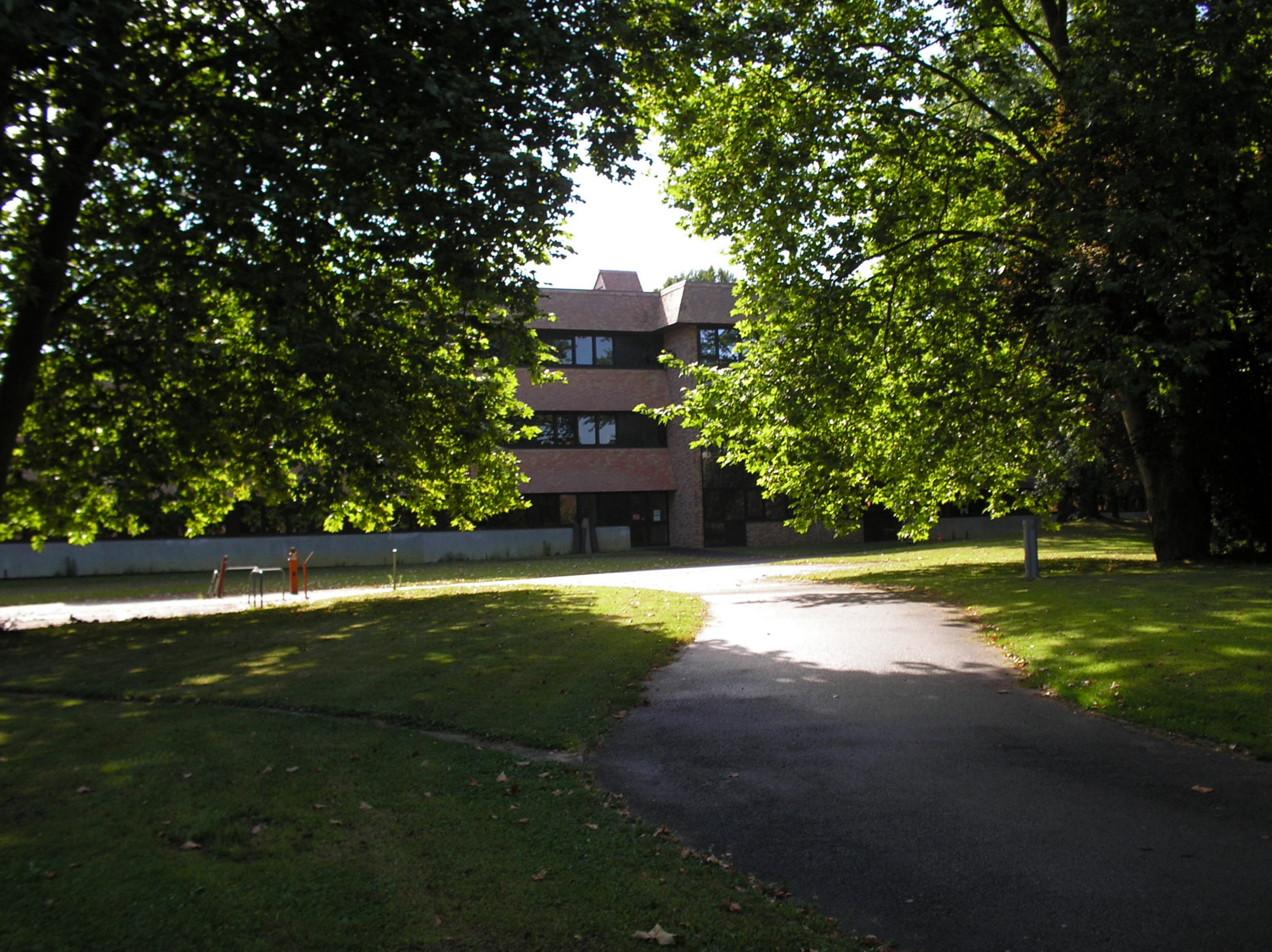
View of the rear of Department of Arts

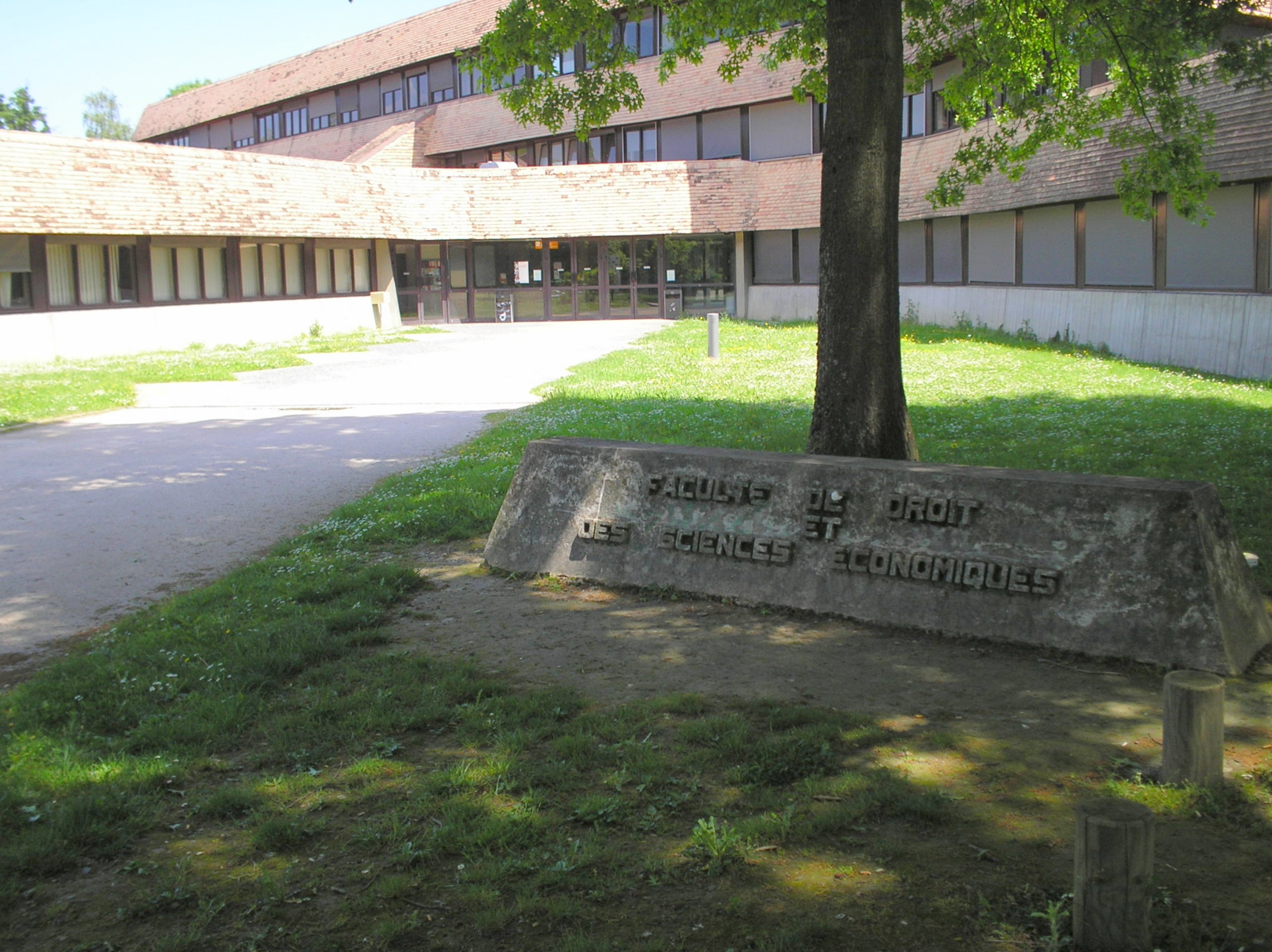
South-western entrance door to the department

The College of Social Sciences and Humanities is located in the north-western part of the Pau campus. To the south is a large lawn much appreciated by students during summer months. The department is lodged in an elaborate three storey building with amphitheatre-like classrooms grouped at the eastern corner of the complex. The inner infrastructure is made of unpainted supporting concrete walls with lighter separation painted plaster walls. The exterior roofing is made of small clay tiles. Brick is used for sculptural elements such as the well-like artificial space in the centre of the inner patio, as well as pebbles for floor decoration. Large glass bays are also used as separation elements. Certain features of the building have been given names. The pillar-shape archives room near the student secretary is called 'the lighthouse', the sculpture-like structure in the patio is called 'the well', and the underground part of the building is referred to as 'the cellar'. The coffee-machines place and the eaves of the building are popular meeting points. The concrete sign Faculté de Droit, d'Economie et Gestion serves as a bench in the shade of the trees. There is a nearby cafeteria called "L'Arlequin".

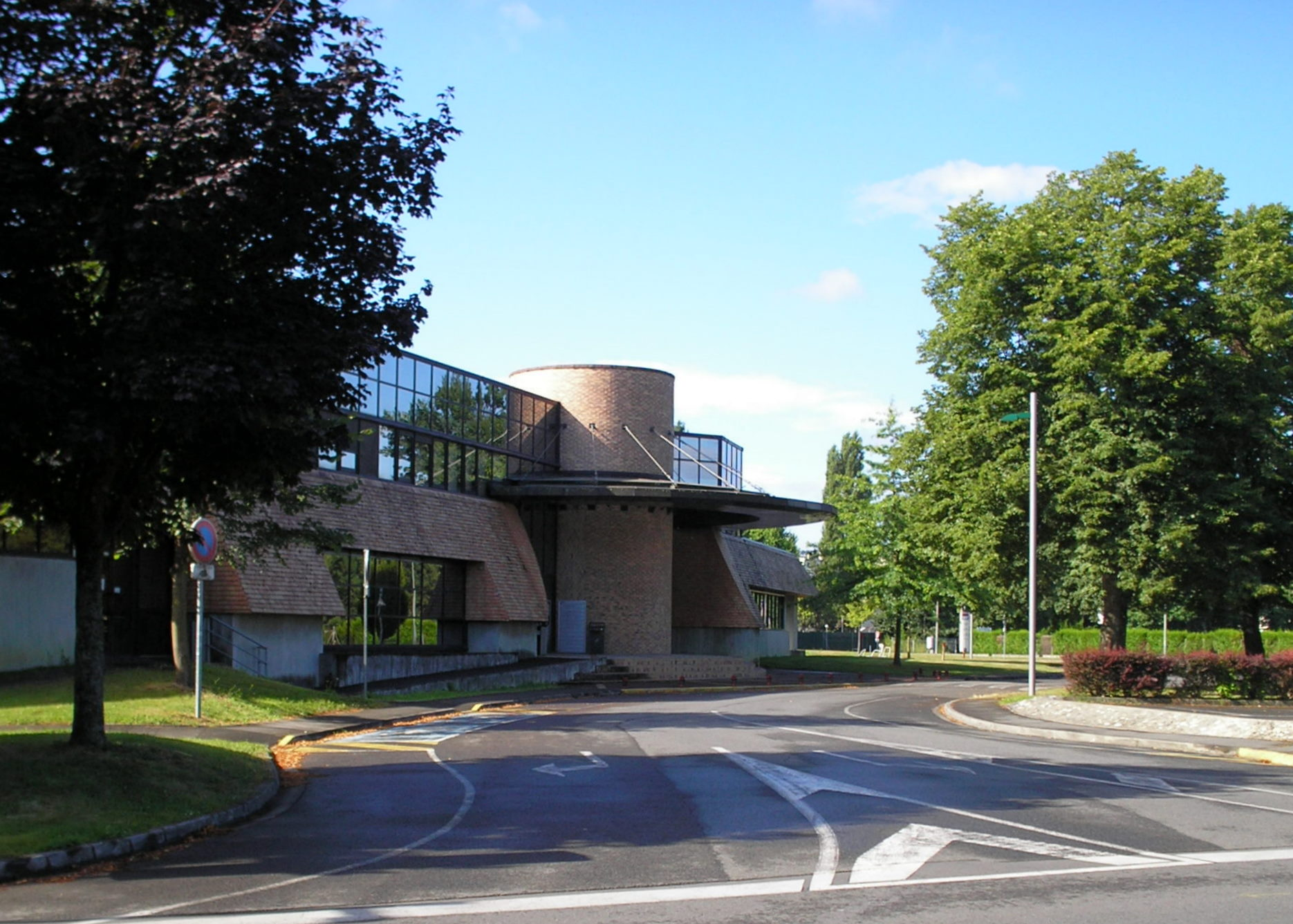
North-western entrance

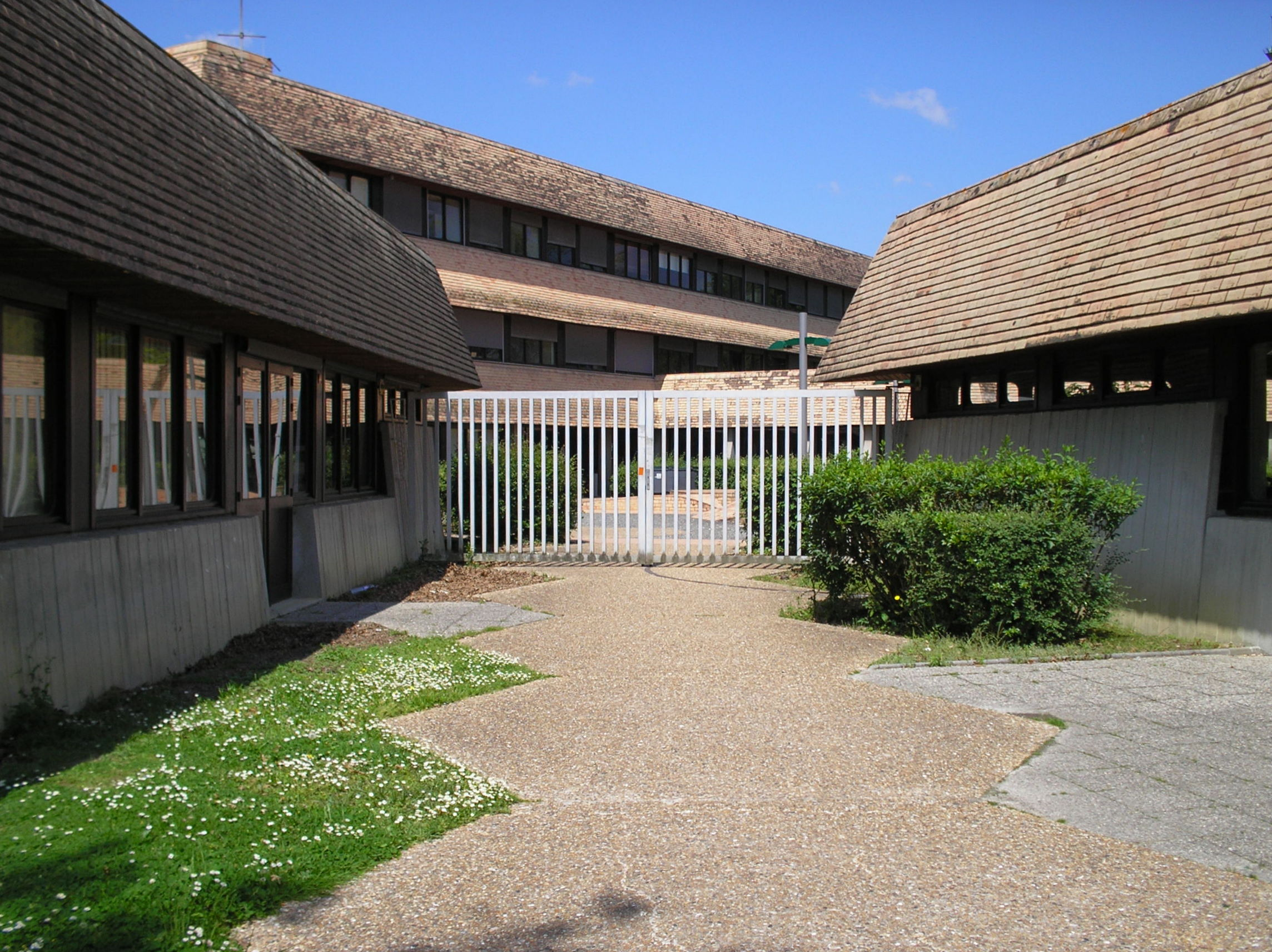
Southern entrance gate near "L'Arlequin" cafeteria

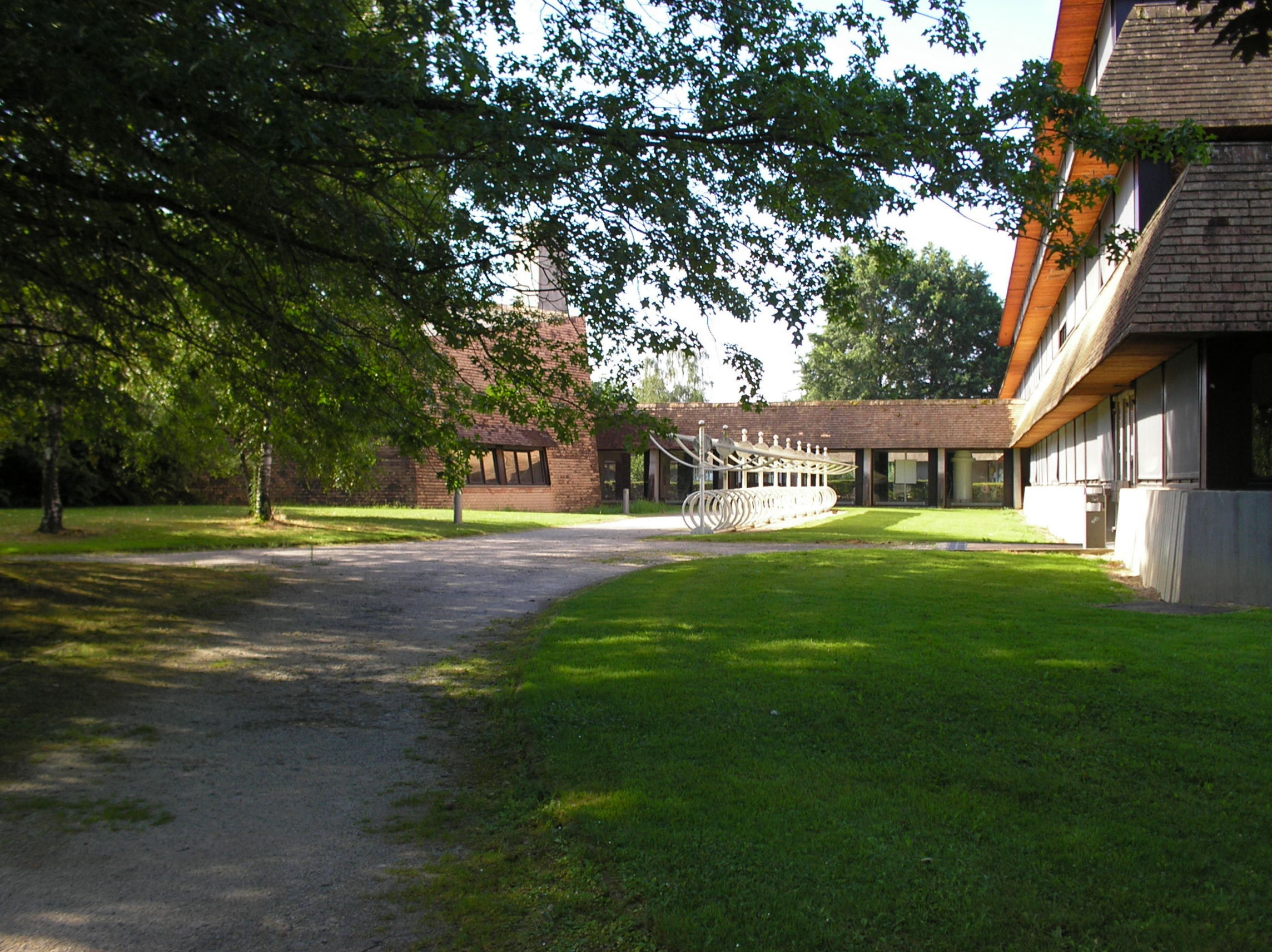
North-eastern entrance near bicycle stand

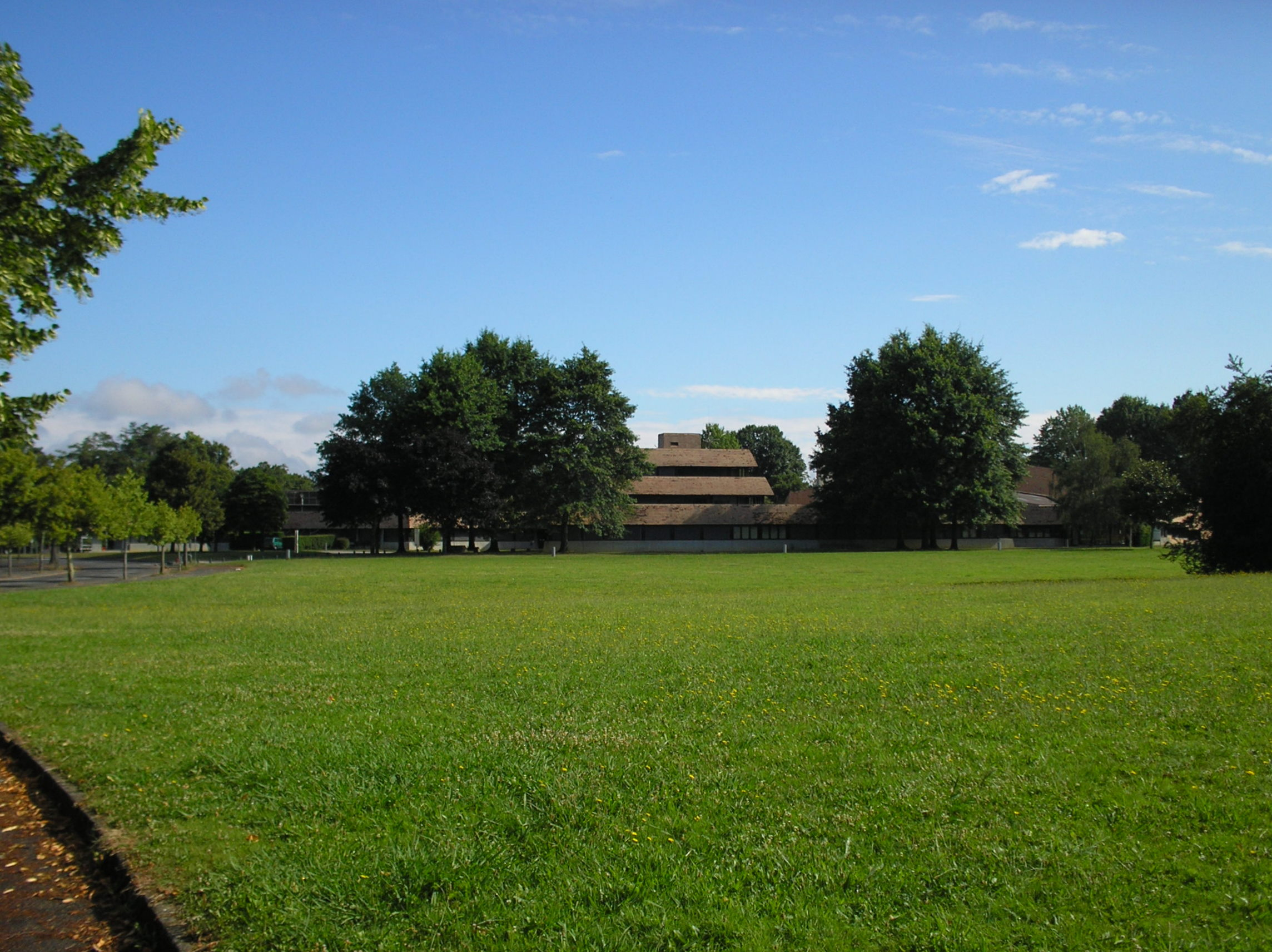
FDEG-IAE view from the lawn

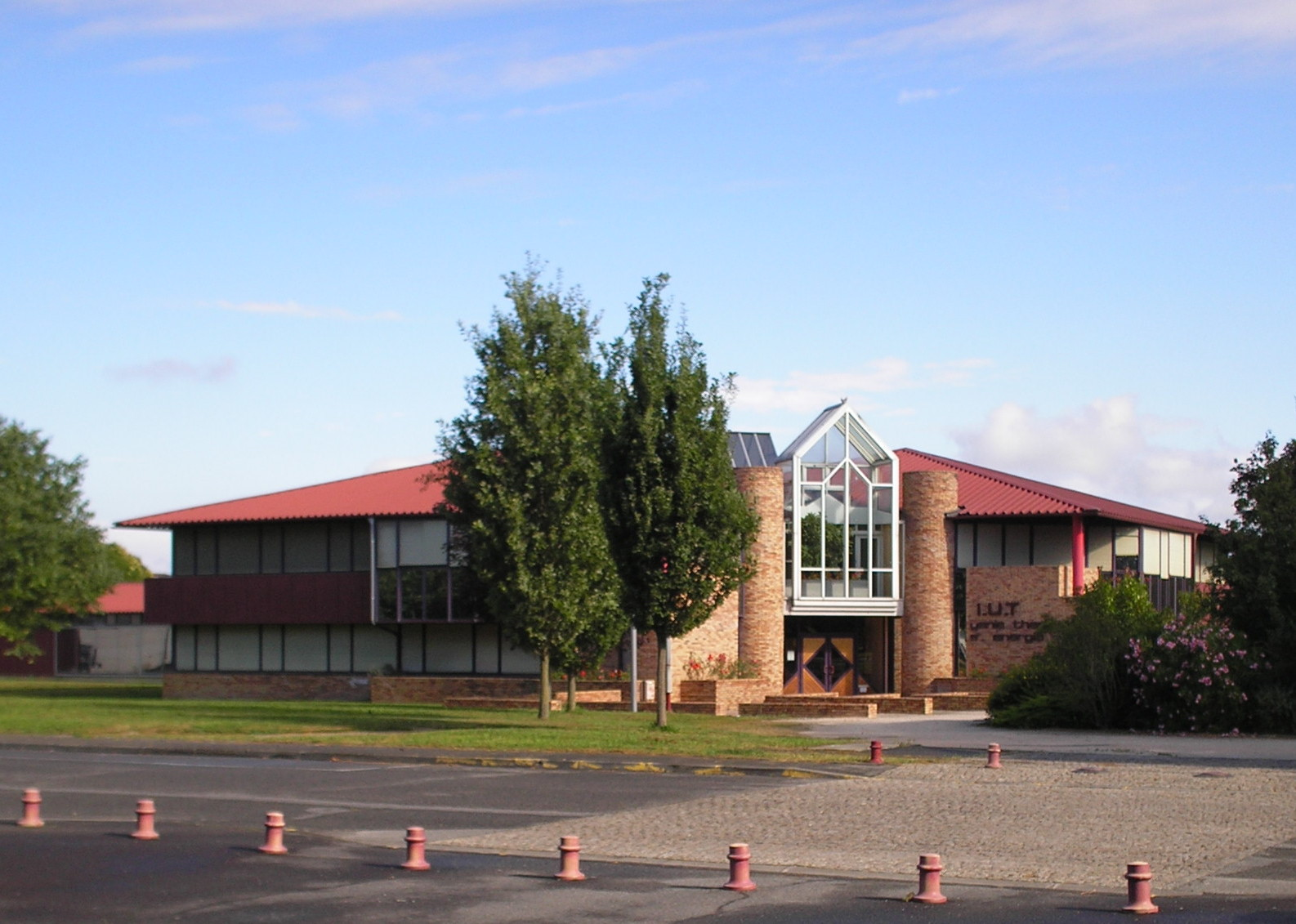
IUT entrance

==== Campus life ====
A total of 8,700 students are located on the Pau campus. This amounts to 63% of the UPPA student body. All matters regarding student life are handled in the Centre Local des Oeuvres Universitaires et Scolaire (CLOUS) ( see : Bordeaux CROUS internet site). There are a number of dormitories (résidences universitaires) situated on the campus (résidence Gaston Phoebus) or near the campus or in town. Accommodation ranges from single rooms to small apartments. The main restaurant is called Cap Sud. It is situated to the South-West of the campus, which is where the maison de l'étudiant is located. There are many student societies on the campus.

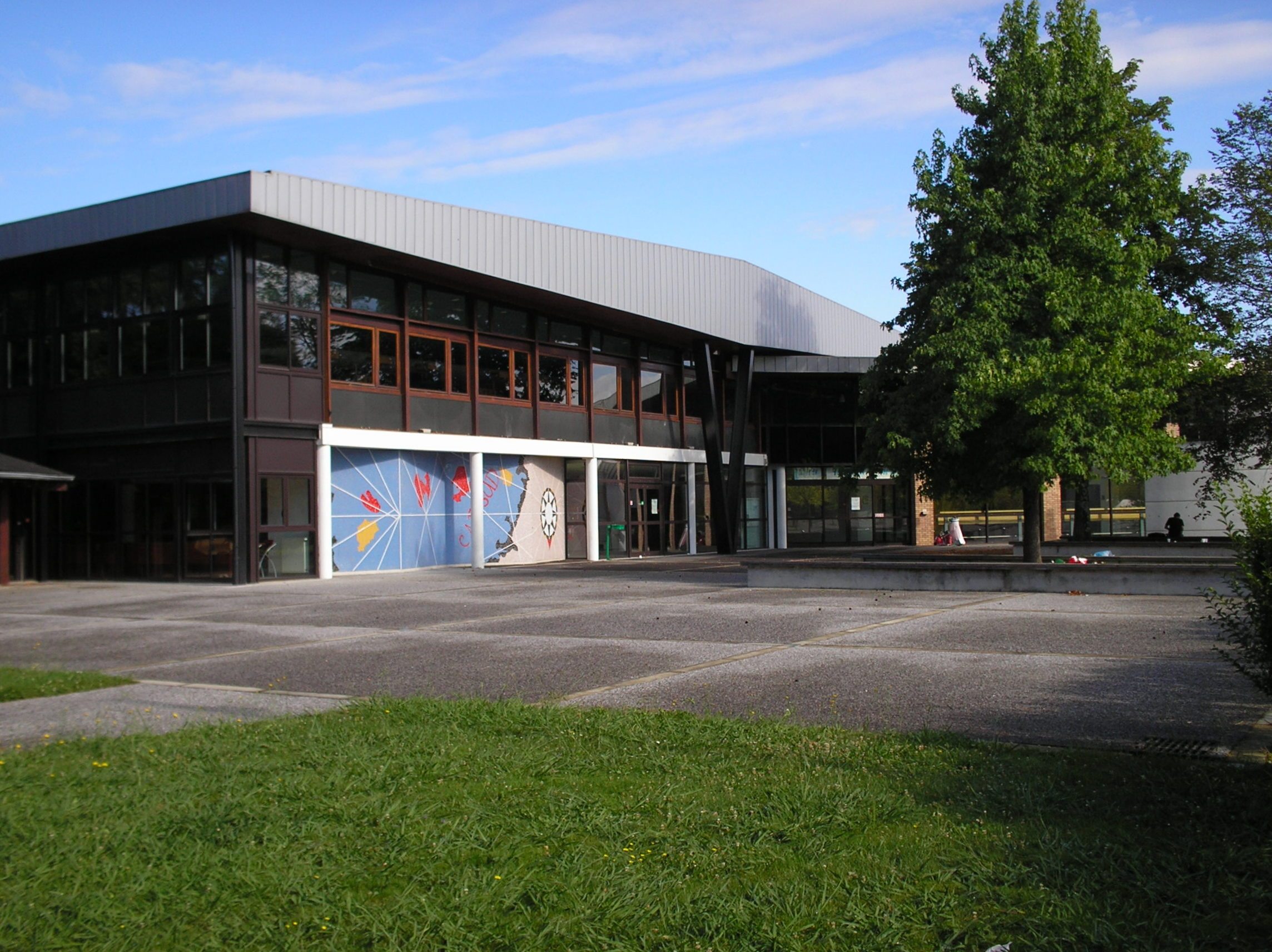
Cap Sud university restaurant

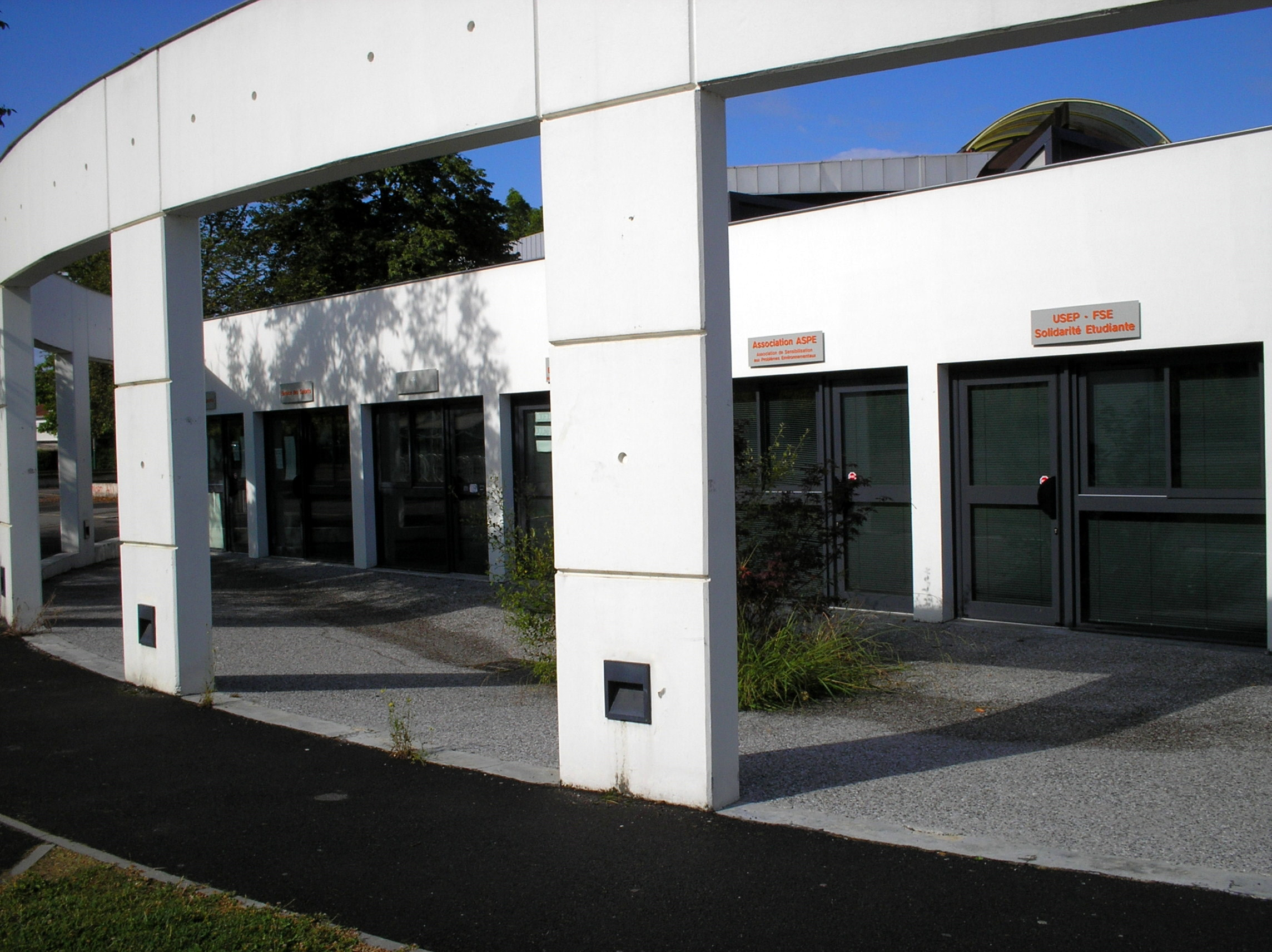
Maison de l'étudiant near Cap Sud restaurant

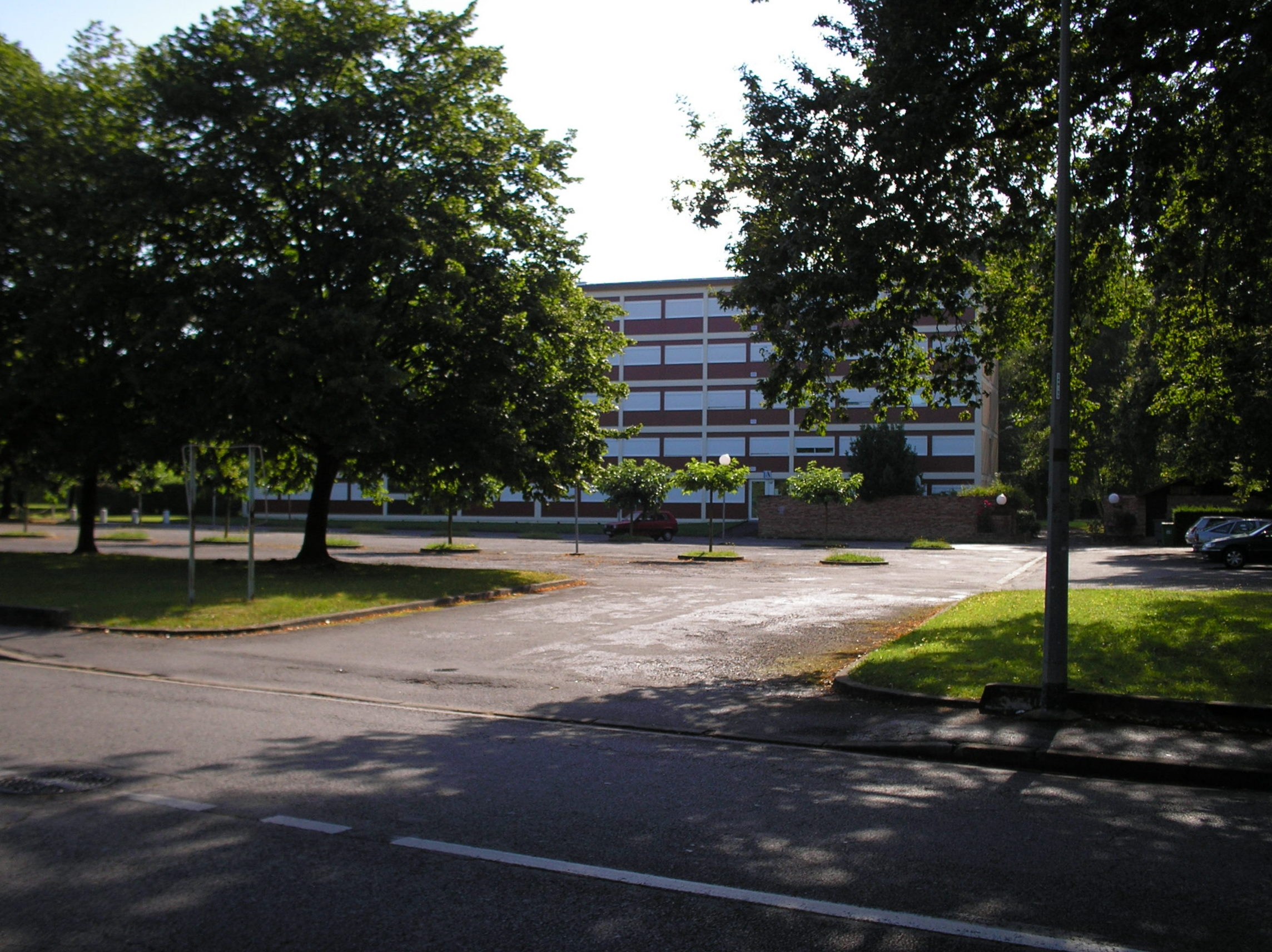
Rear of Gaston Phoebus dormitory building

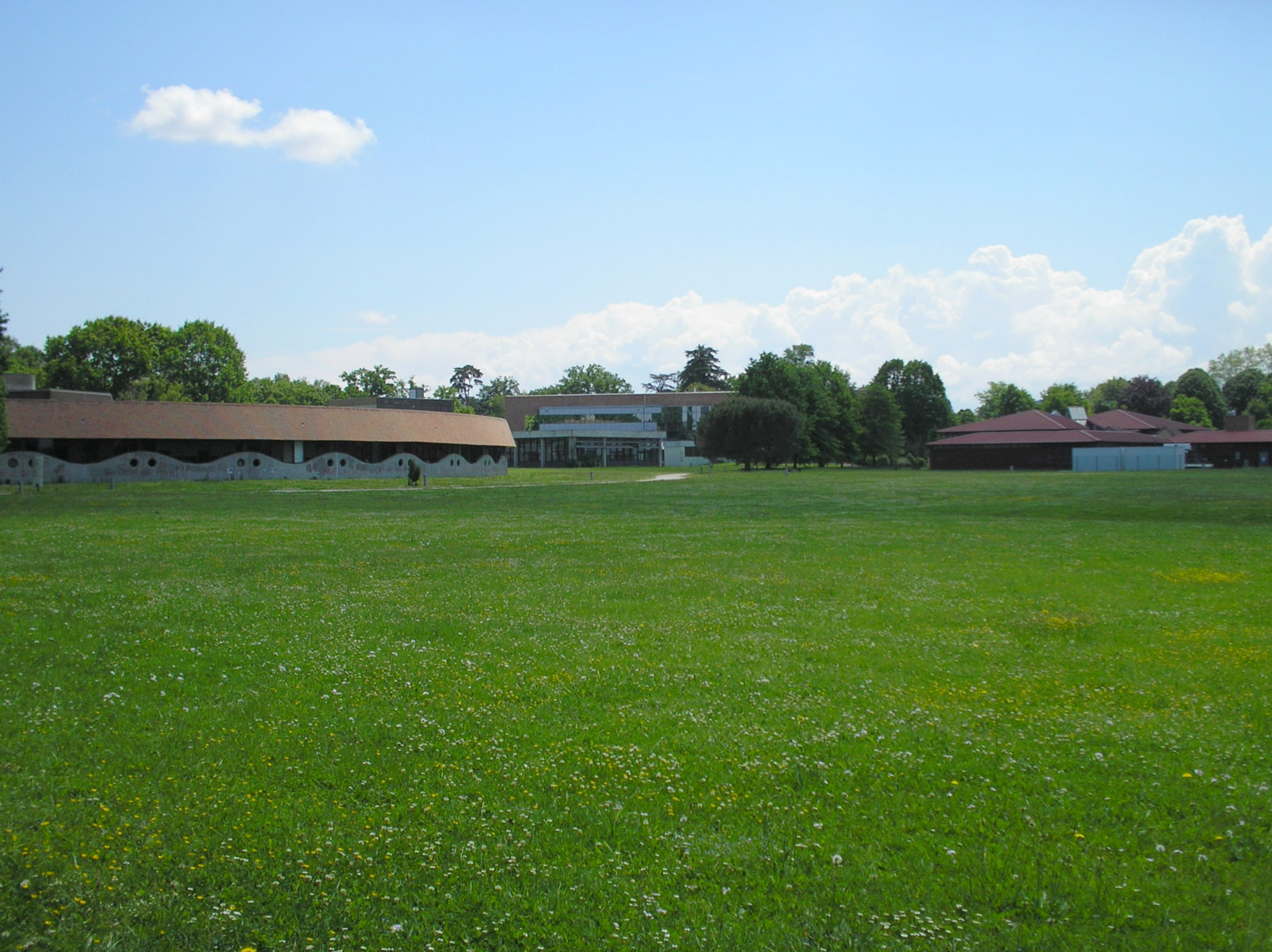
Partial view on BU Lettres et droit and rear of Présidence building from the lawn

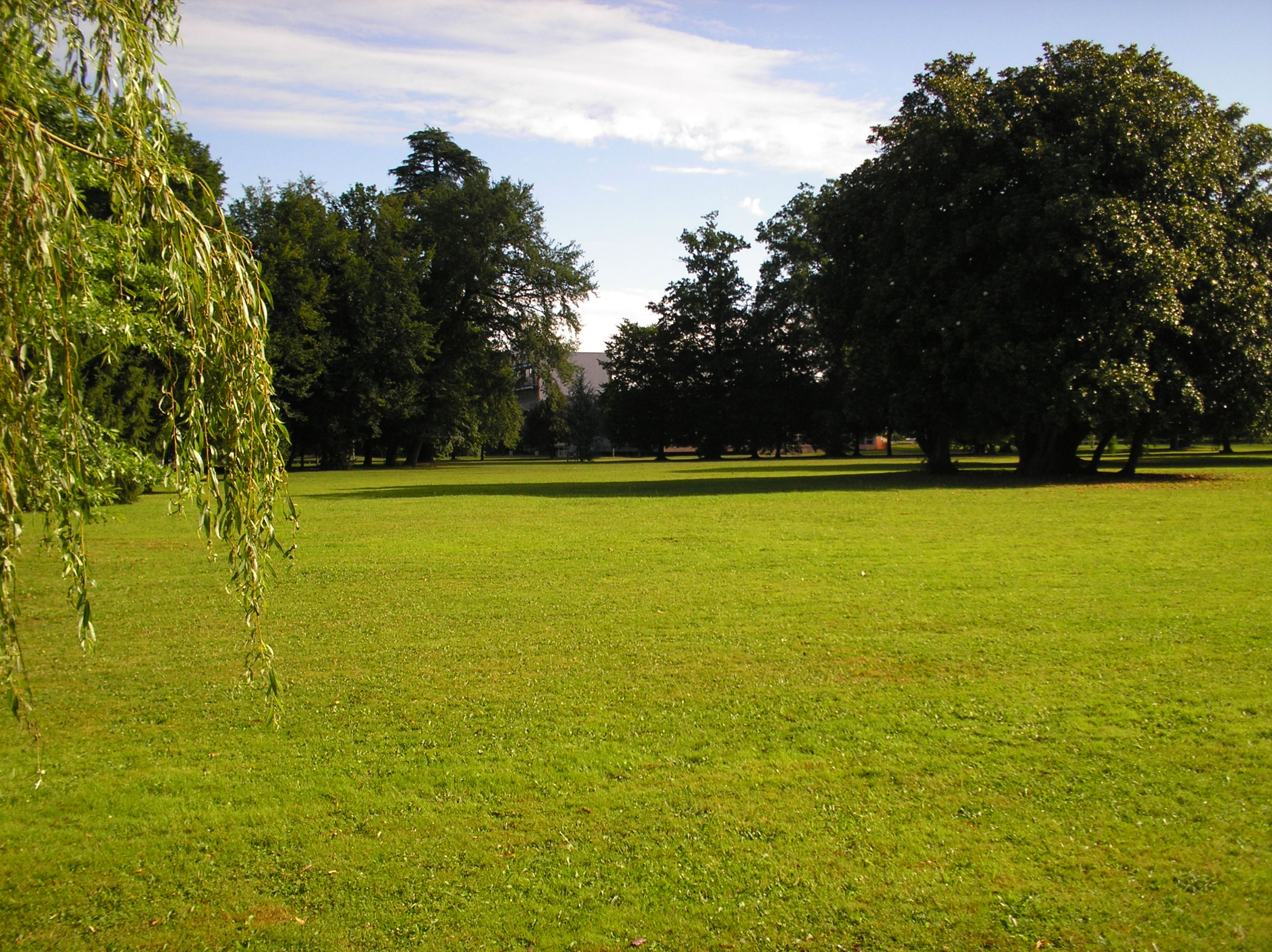
South-eastern lawn

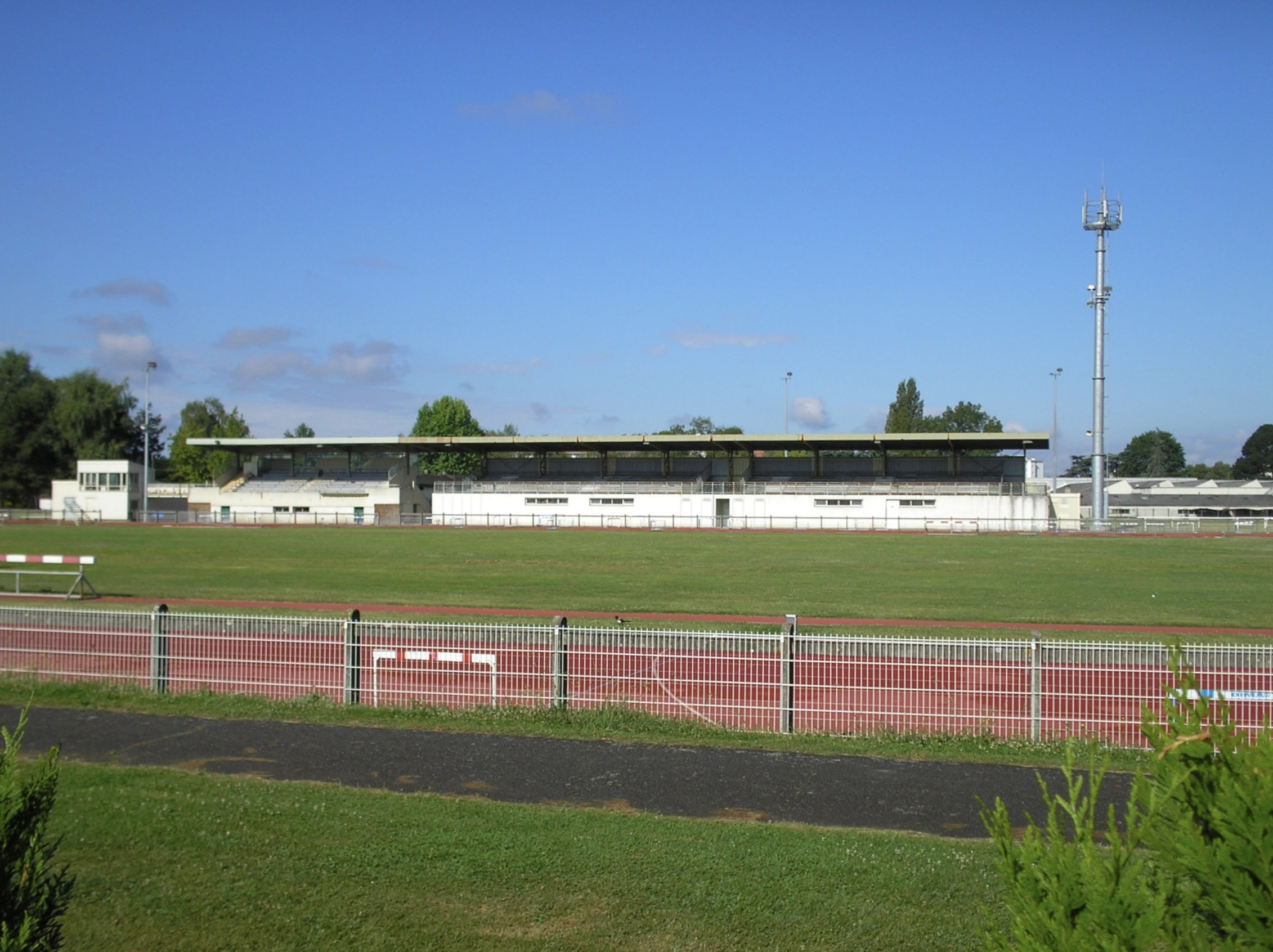
André Lavie stadium near UPPA campus

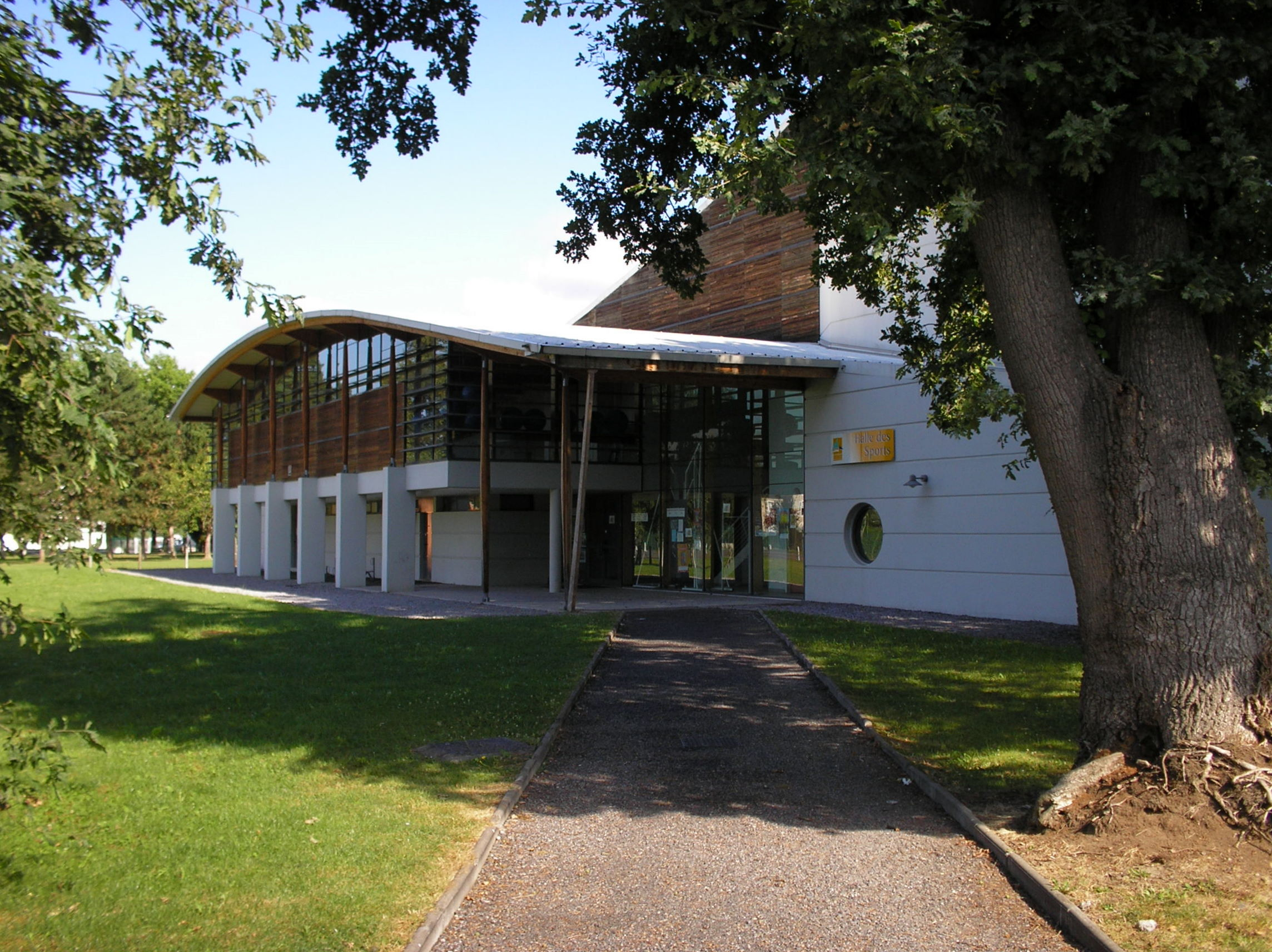
UPPA Sport Hall

Staff issues are handled by the Direction des ressouces humaines (DRH) services situated on the second floor in the Présidence building. There is an eatery at Cap Sud dedicated to University personnel (L'oasis). Staff belonging to IATOSS or ITRF personnel categories can also eat at the nearby Cité administrative's restaurant inter-administratif (RIA). There are a number of Unions present on the campus.

Sport at UPPA is organised by SUAPS service. There are a number of sporting facilities including André Lavie Stadium close to Pau's Léo Lagrange COSEC, UPPA sport hall (Halle des sports) close to Plein Ciel swimming pool and tennis courts, a football (soccer) field, an outdoor climbing wall on BU Droit-Lettres.

==== Nearby facilities ====
Located near Pau's university campus are a number of facilities:

- Pau Université E.Leclerc mall, with its L'île aux sandwichs, its Centre culturel book and computer store, located opposite the campus across Rue Allées Condorcet
- Carrefour Market mall, facing Présidence southern entrance
- Quick fast-food restaurant, a MégaCGR cinema,
- Pau's Université-La Poste post-office and a mail box along Dean Poplawski avenue

Also located nearby are the Lycée Saint-John Perse, the Helioparc site, a police station, an administrative centre, a Maison de l'agriculture, a church, several banks and a variety of stores.

=== Bayonne Campus ===
The UPPA Bayonne campus is located between the rivers Adour and Nive near the centre of Bayonne. There are facilities for the College of European and International Studies and the College of Sciences and Technologies for Energy and the Environment (STEE). Almost 2,500 students are enrolled at this campus amounting to 17% of the UPPA student population.

=== Anglet Campus ===
The UPPA Anglet campus is located at Allée du Parc Montaury, Anglet. It has almost 1,500 students (11% of UPPA students) in the College of Sciences and Technologies for Energy and the Environment (STEE). It is composed of:

- Sciences Anglet
- IUT de Bayonne (Département Informatique et GIM)
- ISABTP (Institut Supérieur Aquitain du Bâtiment et des Travaux Publics)

=== Tarbes Campus ===
The College of Social Sciences and Humanities (SSH) has facilities on the campus in Tarbes. A total of over 800 students (6% of UPPA students) are enrolled at this campus.

=== Mont-de-Marsan Campus ===
The UPPA campus at Mont de Marsan has facilities for the College of Sciences and Technologies for Energy and the Environment (STEE) with 400 students (4% UPPA students).

== Reputation ==
University rankings

Global – Overall
- THE World: 1200+

National – Overall
- THE National: 39

The university was ranked in the 1200+ band of world universities and in the 601-800 band for research in Life Sciences and in Engineering & Technology by Times Higher Education World University Rankings 2022.

In the 2022 QS World University Rankings (QS) subject tables, it was ranked in the 301-400 band for Energy Science and Engineering.

== Notable people ==
=== Faculty ===
- Robert Poplawski (1886–1953) - lawyer
- Manuel Tuñón de Lara (1915–1997) - Spanish historian
- Pierre Léon (1926–2013) - linguist and writer
- Françoise Deslogères (born 1929) - musician
- Antonio Rodríguez de las Heras (1947–2020) - Spanish historian
- Jean-Michel Roddaz (born 1948) - historian of ancient Rome
- Jean Michel Larrasket (1950–2018) - engineer
- David Diop (born 1966) - novelist; winner of 2021 International Booker Prize
- David Martimort (born 1967) - economist; winner of the Prix du meilleur jeune économiste de France in 2004
- Richard Chbeir (born 1975) - computer scientist

=== Alumni ===
- Alain Vidalies (born 1951) - lawyer and politician
- Coralie Frei (born 1951) - nurse and writer Comoros
- Martine Lignières-Cassou (born 1952) - mayor of Pau (2008–2014)
- Itxaro Borda (born 1959) - Basque writer
- Gunilla Asker (born 1962) - Swedish businesswoman
- Olivier Chauzu (born 1963) - Franco-Spanish classical pianist.
- Andy Byford (born 1965) - British transport executive
- Sonia Backès (born 1976) - politician, leader of the Caledonian Republicans party and the President of the Provincial Assembly of South Province
- Isabelle Ithurburu (born 1983) - sports journalist

=== Recipients of honorary degree ===
- Evo Morales (born 1959) - Bolivian politician
