= Palais Rohan, Bordeaux =

City Hall in France

Palais Rohan
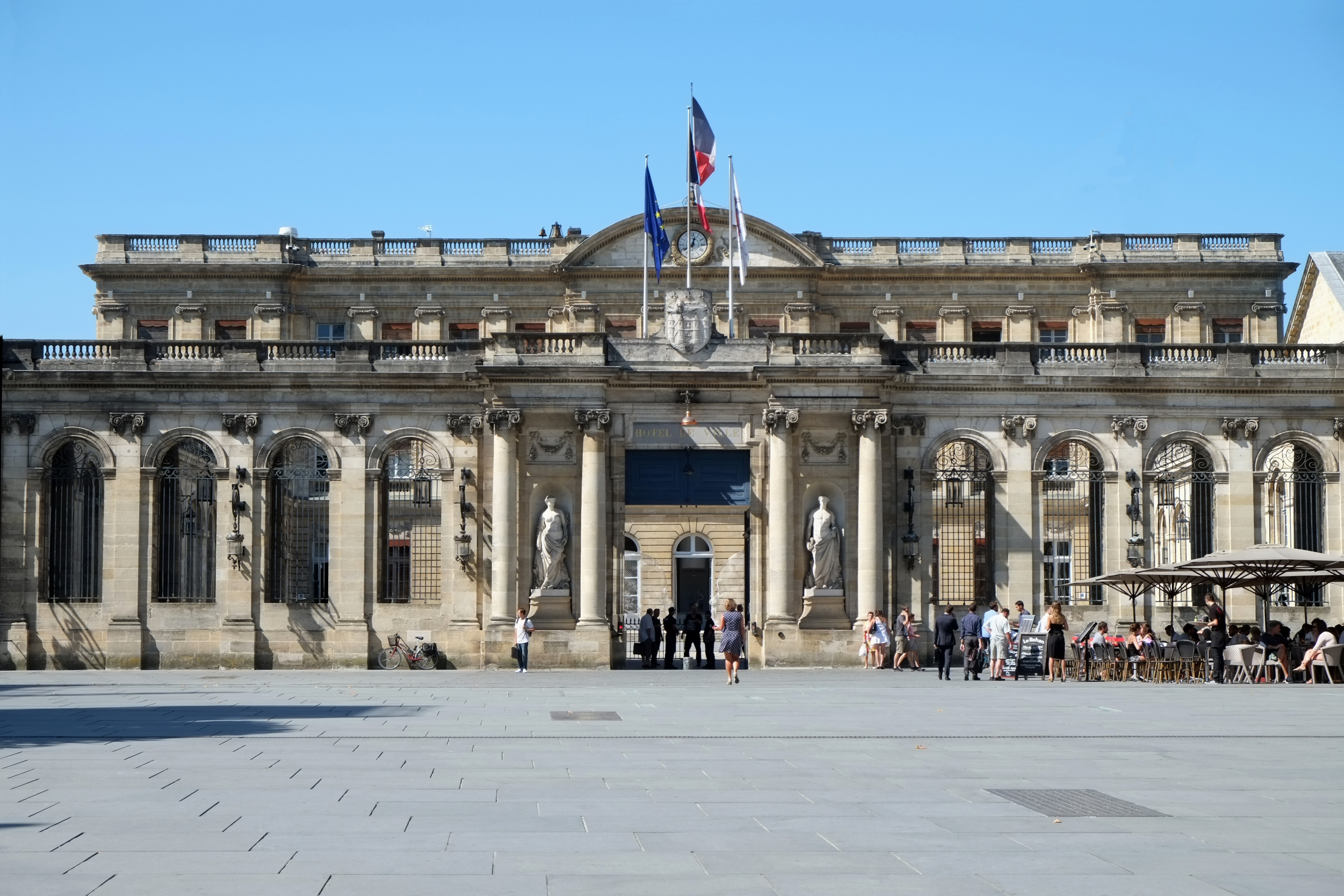
- Main frontage of the Palais Rohan in September 2013

General information
- Type: City hall
- Architectural style: Neoclassical style
- Location: Bordeaux, France
- Coordinates: 44.8379°N 0.5793°W
- Completed: 1778

Design and construction
- Architects: Joseph Étienne and Richard-François Bonfin

Monument historique
- Official name: Palais de Rohan (ancien archevêché, actuel Hôtel de ville)
- Type: Inscrit
- Designated: 1997
- Reference no.: PA00083157

The Palais Rohan is the Hôtel de Ville, or City Hall, of Bordeaux, France. The building was constructed in the 18th century, originally serving as the Archbishop's Palace of Bordeaux. It was designated a monument historique by the French government in 1997.

== History ==
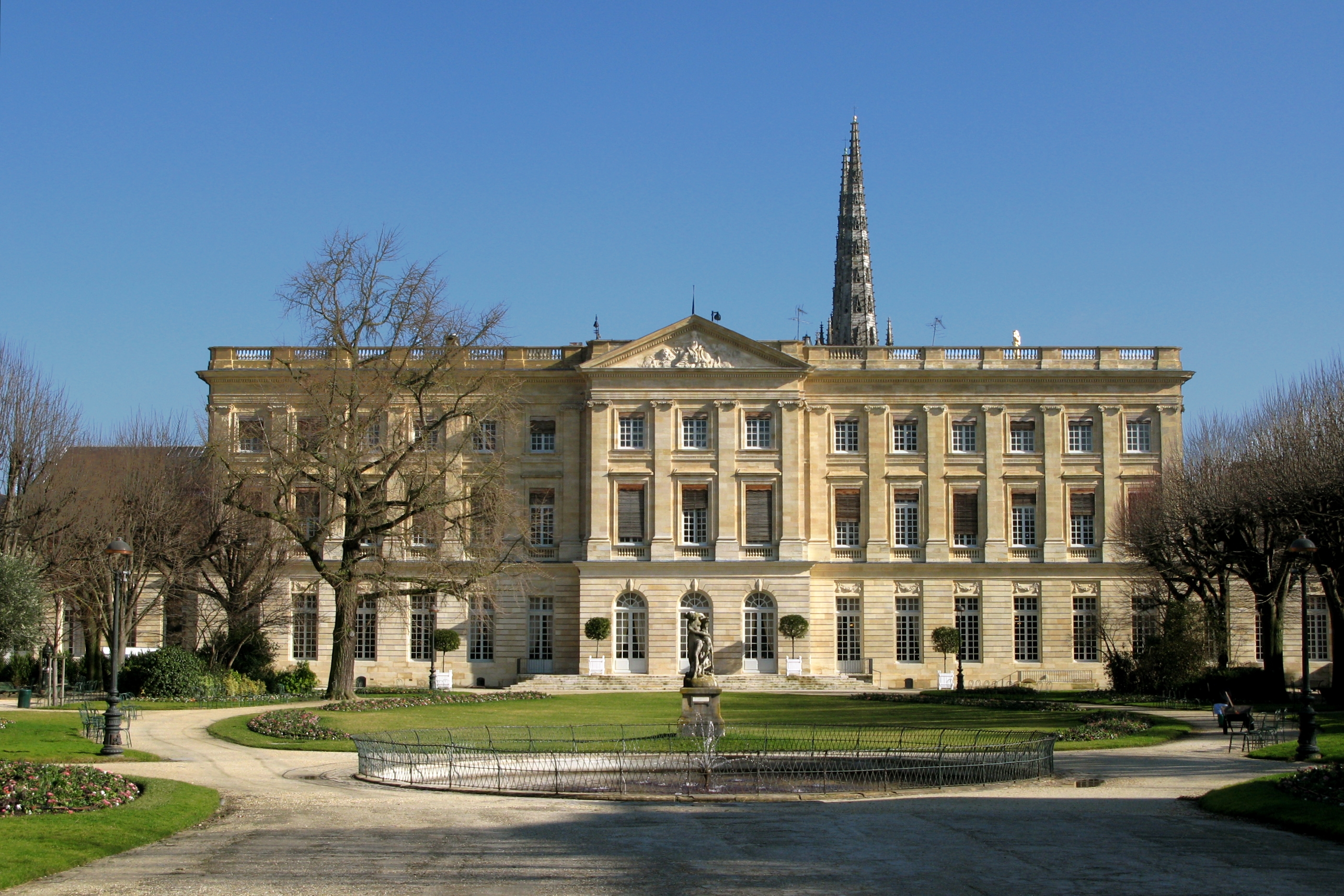
Rear façade overlooking garden

In 1771, the new Archbishop of Bordeaux, Ferdinand Maximilien Mériadec de Rohan, decided to commission a new building to replace the old medieval archbishop's residence, which occupied the western part of the grounds of Bordeaux Cathedral. The new building would be a typical hôtel particulier with a grand portal, a grand courtyard and two ornate façades. The new building was designed, initially by Joseph Étienne, and later by Richard-François Bonfin, in the neoclassical style, built in ashlar stone, and was completed in 1778.

The layout involved a three-storey main building at the back of a courtyard, with single-storey wings on either side and an arcaded screen at the front. The main building had 15 bays, with the last two bays on either side slightly projected forward. The ground floor was rusticated. The central section of three bays, which was also slightly projected forward, featured three rounded openings on the ground floor. The building was fenestrated by square headed windows on all three floors. All bays were flanked by Ionic order pilasters supporting an entablature, a modillioned cornice and a balustraded parapet. There was a segmental shaped pediment above the central section with a clock in the tympanum. Internally, the principal rooms were the main reception rooms, which were decorated by motifs created by the sculptor Barthélemy Cabirol. The staircase is regarded as an important example of stereotomy.

After the French Revolution in 1791, the building housed the Gironde department prefecture. It became an imperial palace for Napoleon in 1808 and a royal residence for Louis XVIII in 1815. It was then converted for municipal use as the Hôtel de Ville for Bordeaux in 1835. The building was badly damaged during a fire, in which the municipal archives were destroyed, on 13 June 1862.

In the late 1870s, two new wings, intended to accommodate the Musée des Beaux-Arts de Bordeaux, were constructed behind the main building to a design by Charles Burguet. The rebuilding after the fire involved a new council chamber, completed in 1889, which was designed in a style characteristic of official architecture during the Third Republic.

After the former mayor, Adrien Marquet, served as a minister under the Vichy Regime during the Second World War, he resigned and it was left to the first deputy mayor, Robert Poplawski, to welcome the committee of liberation to the building on 29 August 1944 during the liberation of the Bordeaux.

On the night of October 5 to 6, 1996, during the tenure of Alain Juppé as both Mayor of Bordeaux and Prime Minister of France, a bomb exploded under the windows of the mayor's office, next to the garden. The attack was claimed the next day by the Corsican group FLNC-Canal Historique. The explosion damaged the ground floor of the building, but caused no casualties. On 23 March 2023, the building was set on fire by protesters during the pension reform strikes. The front door was affected, though the fire was put out promptly by firefighters.
