= Pierre Léon =

French-Canadian linguist and writer

Pierre R. Léon (March 12, 1926 – September 11, 2013) was a French-Canadian linguist and writer.

== Life and career ==
Léon was born in Ligré, Touraine, France, on March 12, 1926. He received a PhD from the university of Besançon in 1960 and a Doctor of Arts from the Sorbonne in 1972, where he also worked as an assistant professor. He was a research professor at the University of Besançon and taught at the University of Pau. He went on to teach at Ohio University and then at the University of Toronto, gaining professor emeritus status there. He founded the academic journals Studia Phonetica, 3L and Information et Communication. At U of T, he founded and headed the laboratory of phonetics research in the department of French Studies. He has written several important books on French linguistics. As a fiction writer, his authorship has earned him multiple accolades.

== Death ==
Léon died of cancer on September 11, 2013, in Toronto, Ontario, Canada.

== Selected publications ==
=== Fiction ===
- Les Voleurs d’étoiles de Saint-Arbroussepoil, Montreal, Leméac, 1982
- Pigou, Fiflard et compagnie, Winnipeg, Éditions des Plaines, 1993
- Sur la piste des Jolicoeur, Montreal, VLB, 1993
- L’Effrontée de Cuba, Toronto, GREF, 2007

=== Non-fiction ===
- With Parth Bhatt, Structure du français moderne, 1988 / 3rd edition, Canadian Scholars Press, 2005
- Phonétisme et prononciations du français, Paris, Nathan-Fac, 1992 / 3rd edition, 1998 / 4th edition, Armand-Colin, 2005 / 5th edition, Armand-Colin, 2007
- With Monique Léon, La prononciation du français, Paris, Nathan, 1997 / 2nd edition, Armand Colin, 2009
