= Jeanne Blancard =

French composer and pianist

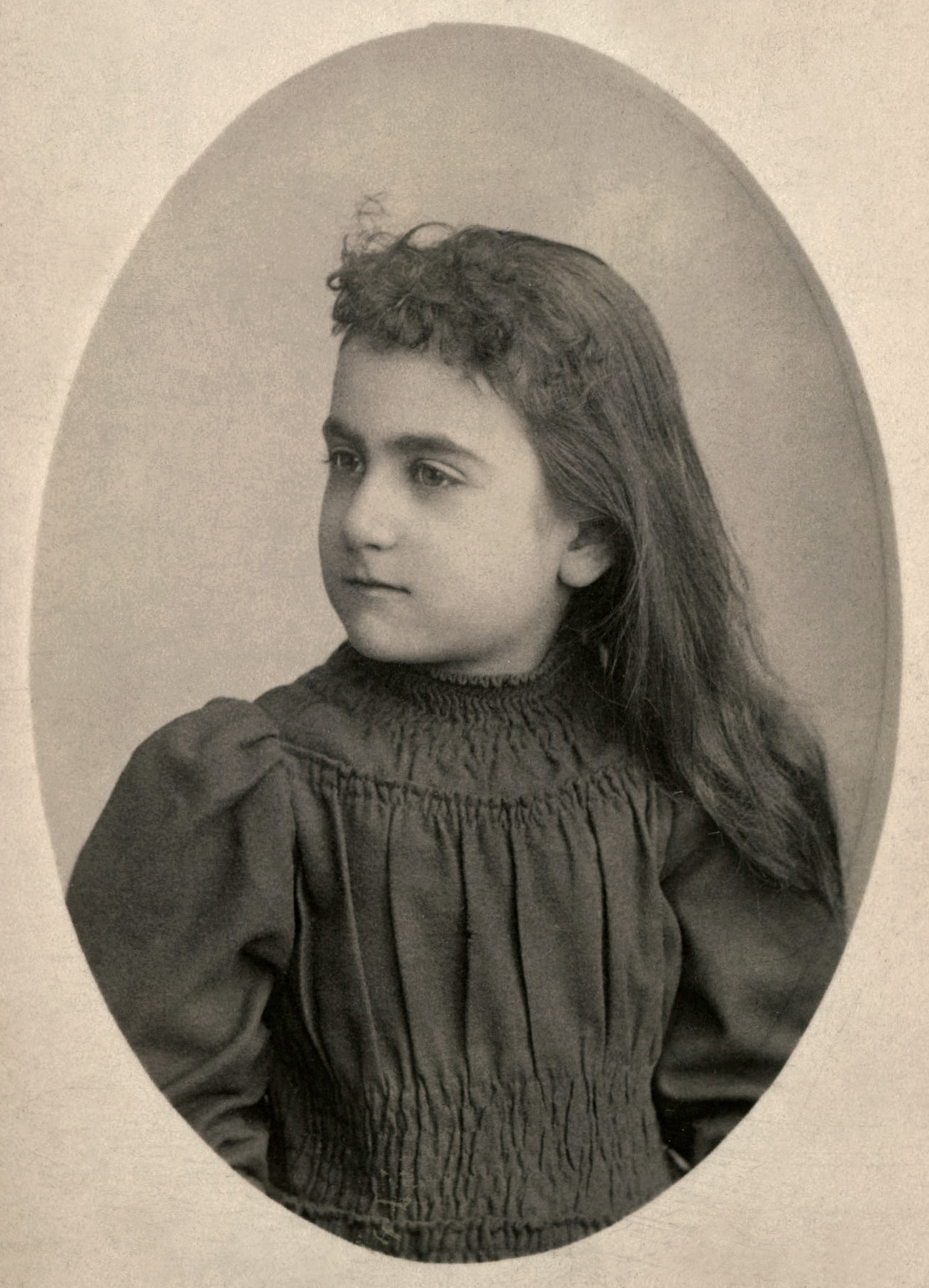
- Jeanne Blancard, c. 1894

Background information
- Born: 1884
- Died: 1972 (aged 87–88) Villiers-le-Bel, France
- Occupation: Composer
- Instrument: Piano

Jeanne Blancard (1884–1972) was a French composer and pianist.

== Early life ==
In 1884, Blancard was born in France. Blancard's mother was Célestine Blancard, a composer.

== Career ==
Blancard was a child prodigy. Before Blancard was 8 years old, she had already composed the Six pièces pour le piano. In 1894, when Blancard was 10 years old, the Pastorale pour le piano, the Première valse, the Marche nuptiale were published. Blancard's fame crossed the Atlantic. At twenty, Blancard gave concerts at the Salle Pleyel, a concert hall in Paris, France. Blancard was a professor at the École Normale de Musique de Paris; among her pupils were Éric Gaudibert, Françoise Deslogères, and Jacques Greys.

== Works ==
- Pastorale pour le piano Op. 8; illustrated by H. Viollet (Maquet 1894) Score on Gallica
- Première valse (Maquet 1894) Score on Gallica
- Six pièces pour le piano (Maquet 1894) Score on Gallica
- Fileuse (Maquet 1897) Score on Gallica
- Marche nuptiale pour le piano (Maquet 1894) Score on Gallica
- Principes élémentaires de la technique pianistique: d'après la méthode Alfred Cortot (Salabert 1938)
