= Antonio Rodríguez de las Heras =

Spanish historian (1947–2020)

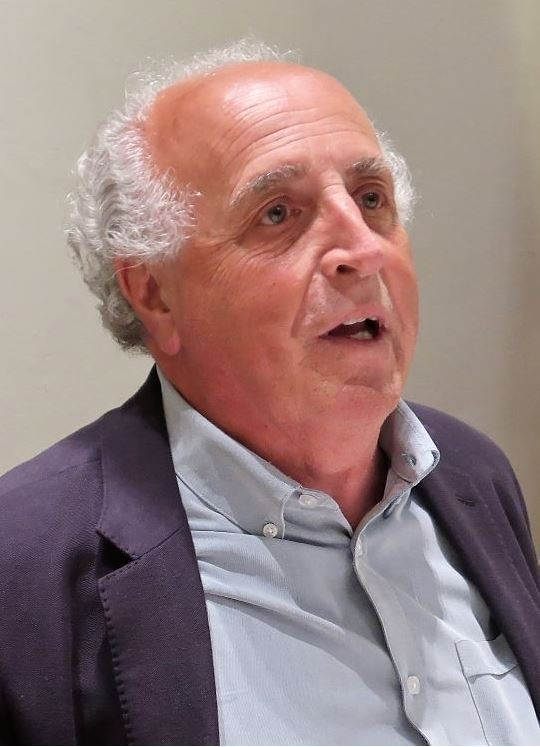
- Born: Antonio Rodríguez de las Heras Pérez; 19 September 1947; Vigo, Spain
- Died: 5 June 2020 (aged 72); Madrid, Spain
- Occupation: historian

Antonio Rodríguez de las Heras Pérez (19 September 1947 – 5 June 2020) was a Spanish historian, a professor at the Charles III University of Madrid, Dean of the Faculty of Humanities, Communication and Documentation and Director of the Institute of Culture and Technology of the Carlos III University. He was also a member of the Advisory Council of TeamLabs since its foundation in 2013.

== Early life and education ==
Rodríguez was born on 19 September 1947, in Vigo, Pontevedra, due to the transfer of his family from Salamanca to the Galician city because his father was director of the laboratory of the Oceanographic Center of Vigo, from 1941 until his death in August from 1958; and in 1952 being president of the Delegate of the Superior Council of Chemical Colleges; he was also founder and dean of the Official College of Chemists of Vigo, later known as the Official College of Chemists of Galicia.

Rodríguez studied physics in Madrid, a career he abandoned to move to Salamanca where he studied at the Faculty of Philosophy and Letters.

== Career ==
After finishing his studies, he began his professional career conducting interviews with well-known writers such as Salvador Espriu, Camilo José Cela, Antonio Buero Vallejo and Ana María Matute, among others for ABC's Mirador Literario. In 1971, he published the biography of Ángel María de Lera, whom he met personally, after managing to overcome the pitfalls of censorship.

Rodríguez worked for the Faro de Vigo and El Adelanto de Salamanca, work that he combined with the writing of Os carneiros, a book on the migration of the Portuguese to Europe. He presented the doctoral thesis on Filiberto Villalobos at the University of Salamanca in 1974. The thesis obtained the Extraordinary Doctorate Award and the Board of Trustees Award from the University of Salamanca.

That same year he held the position of professor at the University of Extremadura, a place he chose to work instead of Salamanca because his wife was a professor at the Laboral University. A year later, he began to develop his "method of discourse topology" for the analysis of political discourse. The method was applied in the history teaching of said faculty.

Between 1974 and 1992, Rodríguez was a professor at the University of Extremadura. First as Interim Professor (1974-1985), then as Titular (1985-1987) and, finally, Professor (1987-1992). In Cáceres he founded the Conflict Research Laboratory (later, Seminar) within the Department of Contemporary History of the Faculty of Philosophy and Letters. In the late 1970s, he introduced the first computers - Apple II - applied to the study of social sciences at the University of Extremadura. Between 1979 and 1980 he was associate professor of Manuel Tuñón de Lara at the University of Pau. He met Tuñón de Lara at the Third Colloquium in Pau, where, as he would recall: "I showed up there in those times when I knew that when you returned they would take your passport from you." He had a lasting and friendly relationship with Tuñón de Lara, of mutual admiration, even when it involved two very different intellectual projects. Between October 1986 and March 1987 he was at the University of Paris VIII as maître de conferences.

He obtained the chair of Contemporary History in 1987, with the research study Theory and Method in Contemporary History. In 1991 he held the position of professor at the Carlos III University of Madrid and later at the University of Extremadura, being named by this doctor honoris causa in 2017.

As a historian, he was a pioneer in the development of the history of the present time, a discipline built on the conviction that from 1945, after the end of World War II, the traditional categories of state and nation were not enough to account for the emergence of new global events, derived from developments in cybernetics, astronautics, nuclear physics and, above all, communication and information technologies. The novelty of his approach materialized in the creation of a new way of approaching sources through the so-called Discourse Topology Method: a graphic representation that shows the relationship between the different concepts that form a discourse or, in other words, the network of relationships that mapped the itineraries that an author goes through to construct his discourse.

Rodríguez was a specialist in the interaction between Humanities and Technology, founder of the Faculty of Humanities, Communication and Documentation, and founder and director of the Institute of Culture and Technology (ICyT) of the Carlos III University of Madrid. "The knowledge society," said Antonio Rodríguez de las Heras, "will be made with scientists, teachers and artists", because without this meeting of sensibilities we will not have the necessary social metabolism to convert information into knowledge.

From the Extremaduran stage, his interest in hypertext was not only theoretical, although his interest increased after his arrival in Madrid. He was also interested in practicing small pioneering experiments in an artisanal way. Among them are pale testimonies of the following: the project done with Guide for the opposition to the chair in 1987, By the shore of hypertext (1988) with HyperCard / Hypertalk, Saint Petersburg before the Revolution (1992) with SuperCard, New Spaces (1993) with CDI, Image and memory of the UGT (1994) with CDI, Interactive History of Humanity (1997) with CDI. His vision of the possibilities of new technologies led him to be considered one of the fathers of digital humanities in Spain.

He prepared different articles for dissemination and opinion in the digital magazine Bez and in a biweekly column in El País Retina.

== Death ==
Rodríguez died from COVID-19 at the age of 72 on 4 June 2020, during the COVID-19 pandemic in Spain.

== Awards and distinctions ==
- Extraordinary Doctorate Award and the University of Salamanca Board of Trustees Award (1974)
- Merit Medal from the Carlos III University of Madrid (2006)
- Doctor honoris causa from the University of Extremadura (2018)
- Fundesco Essay Award for his book Navigate information (1990)
