= Märta Lindqvist =

Swedish journalist, writer, and translator

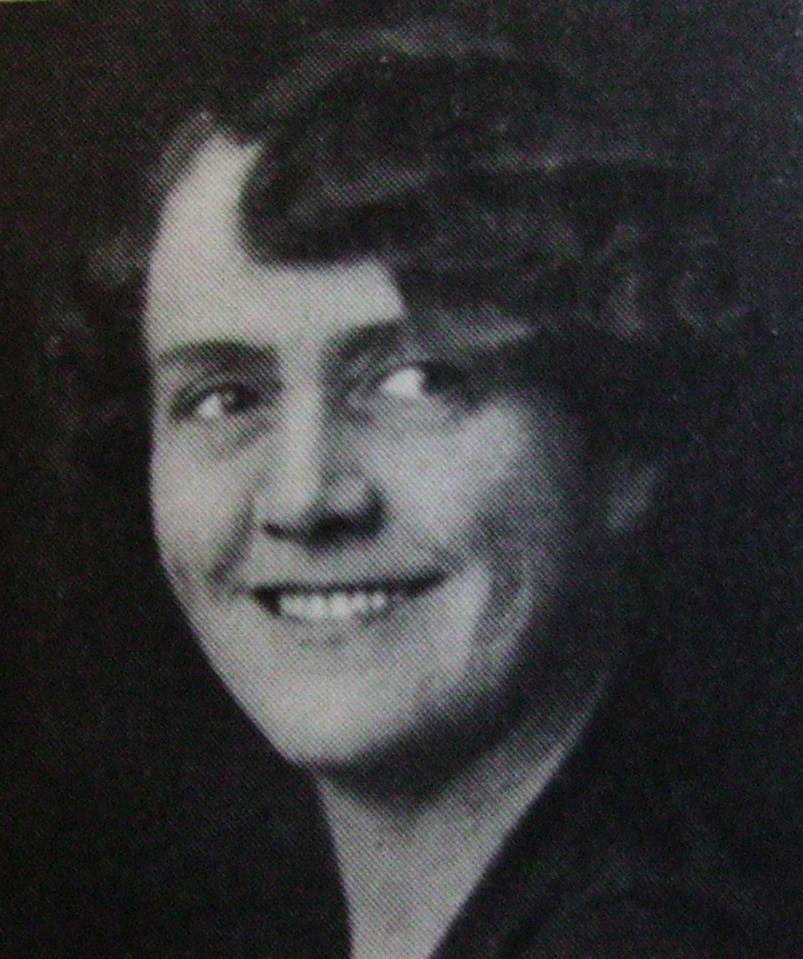
- Märta Lindquist in 1936
- Born: 7 September 1888; Stockholm, Sweden
- Died: 3 April 1939 (aged 50); Stockholm, Sweden
- Education: Uppsala University
- Occupations: Journalist; writer; translator

Märta Lindqvist (7 September 1888 – 3 April 1939) was a Swedish journalist, writer, and translator. She is best known as a film critic for Svenska Dagbladet.

== Life ==
Märta Lindqvist was born into an affluent family in Stockholm, Sweden, on 7 September 1888. Her father, Hugo Lindqvist, was a music director, and her mother, Louise (née Simonsson), was an elementary schoolteacher. She attended the Sofia Almquist's Samskola, where she completed her secondary education and graduated in 1907. In 1908, she studied languages and literature at the Uppsala University, and earned a Master of Philosophy degree in 1913. During her time at Uppsala, she taught at Uppsala Private School and served as a secretary of the English Society.

In 1914, Lindqvist began her career as a literary translator, producing translations of English, Danish and Norwegian language works into Swedish. Her first translations were published between 1914 and 1916, which included translations of works of Beatrice Harraden and Ian Maclaren. In 1916, she was appointed as a journalist for the Swedish newspaper Svenska Dagbladet. Writing under the pseudonym Quelqu'une, her contributions, that included interviews, reportage, and critical reviews of film and fashion, became widely known and established her reputation as a film critic. She also worked as a freelance for Idun on many occasions.

Lindqvist died in Stockholm in 1939.

== Bibliography ==
- Duncan, Isadora (1929). Mitt liv. Stockholm: Geber.
- Macaulay, Rose (1930). Föräldralösa ön. Stockholm: Skoglund.
- Berggrav, Eivind (1937). Biskop ovan polcirkeln. Stockholm: Diakonistyr.
- Mansfield, Katherine (1946). Lycksalighet och andra noveller. Stockholm: Skoglund
- Mansfield, Katherine (1978). Smekmånad och andra berättelser. Stockholm: Trevi.
