= Svenska Utlandstidningen =

Swedish newspaper

Svenska Utlandstidningen (Swedish: [ˈsvɛ̂nːska ˈûːtlandsˌtiːdnɪŋɛn], "Swedish Foreign Newspaper") was a weekly newspaper for non-resident Swedes published between January 1908 and April 1913.

== History and profile ==
Svenska Utlandstidningen was initially published from Berlin by Schwedische Zeitungs-Ges.m.b.H., and carried the byline 'Organ for the Swedes Abroad'. Politically the publication declared itself independent from all political party interests. From January 1909 to April 1913, it was published by Svenska Dagbladet from Stockholm.
