= Gunilla Asker =

Swedish businesswoman

- Born: Sweden
- Education: Uppsala University (MSc)
- Occupation: Businesswomen
- Years active: 2005-present

Gunilla Asker is SvP Marketing for ICA Sweden. In 2013, she was named one of the 125 most powerful businesswomen in Sweden.

== Education ==
Born Gunilla Astrid Henriette Asker in Sweden, she was an exchange student at the Norco High School, Norco, California, USA, in 1980. In 1982, she graduated from Djursholms samskola where she majored in social science. She went on to study at the Uppsala University where she got an MSc in international business administration and economics. Asker also studied French at the University of Pau and Pays de l'Adour in France and attended the Ruter Dam ("Queen of Diamonds") program for women in executive positions, as well as taking courses about strategic development of the Internet, Disruption theory and Authentic Leadership at Harvard Business School.

== Career ==
During most of her professional life, Asker has worked in the fields of strategy, sales and marketing. She has been director at Unilever, SJ AB and Research International/Sifo. In 2005–09, she was Marketing and Sales Director for Svenska Dagbladet, and in 2009 she was appointed CEO for the newspaper. Asker has been in charge of taking the Svenska Dagbladet from a solely printed paper to a multimedia company that serves several digital channels as well as the printed paper. In September 2018 she was appointed SVP Marketing at ICA Sweden. In 2013, she was named one of the 125 most powerful businesswomen in Sweden by business journal Veckans Affärer.

== Other board appointments ==
Asker is member of the board at Knowit AB Sweden, AB Göta Kanalbolag, Tinius Thrust and Blommenholm Industrier AS Norway Sweden
