= Robert Poplawski =

Lawyer in Bordeaux

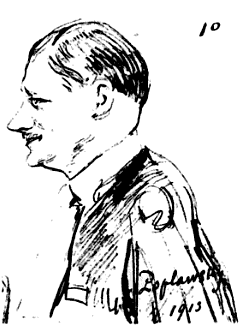
Dean Poplawski caricatured by Pazzi in 1913

Robert Poplawski (born 12 July 1886 in Bordeaux, died 8 August 1953) was a lawyer and a professor at the law faculty in Bordeaux (dean from 1949 till death). His image is tarnished by his role as deputy to Adrien Marquet, the collaborationist mayor of Bordeaux during the World War II, as well as by his antisemitic stances.

His speciality was penal law, but he also studied and published in the field of the pharmaceutical law. He published a pharmaceutical law treaty written with his colleagues Frank Coustou and Jean-Marie Auby.

Robert Poplawski has been chosen in 1946 to direct with Dean Henri Vizioz the law institute in Pau with tuitions given by professors from the law faculty of Bordeaux. This institute has given birth thereafter to the law faculty at the University of Pau and Pays de l'Adour and was lodged in Villa Lawrence in Pau town centre.

In February 2026, at the request of the Representative Council of French Jewish Institutions, the Bordeaux city council voted to change the name of Dean Poplawski Square. It chose to replace it with that of Esther Fogiel, whose parents, grandmother, and brother were arrested in Bordeaux before dying at Auschwitz, and who was a civil party in the Papon trial.
