= List of prize-winners of the International Johann Sebastian Bach Competition =

This is a list of musicians who have been awarded in the International Johann Sebastian Bach Competition in Leipzig since its foundation in 1950.

== Competition by year ==
=== 1950 ===
Piano

- 1 Tatiana Nikolayeva
- 2 Galina Feodorowa, Margarita Fyodorova
- 3 Jörg Demus, Waldemar Maciszewski

Organ

- 1 Amadeus Webersinke, Karl Richter
- 2 Ludwig Dörr, Gerhard Tipp
- 3 Walter Schönheit, Diethard Hellmann

Harpsichord

- 2 Ingrid Heiler

Voice

- 2 Eva Fleischer
- 3 Alina Bolechowska, Christa Maria Ziese

Violin

- 1 Igor Besrodny
- 2 Michail Waimann, Alexei Gorokhov
- 3 Werner Häutling, Agnes Vadas

=== 1964 ===
Piano

- 1 Ilse Graubin
- 2 Wolfgang Wappler, Melita Dukowa-Kolin
- 3 Igor Lazko, Gerhard Erber, Brunhild Partsch

Organ

- 1 Petr Sovadina
- 2 Karl-Rainer Böhme, Andreas Buschnakowski
- 3 Jan Hora

Voice

- 1 Bruce Abel
- 2 Wolfgang Hellmich, Rolf Wollrad
- 3 Wladimir Swistow

=== 1968 ===
Piano

- 1 Valery Afanassiev
- 2 Ivan Klánský
- 3 Evgeni Koroliov

Organ

- 1 Henning Wagner
- 2 Daniel Chorzempa
- 3 Christian Collum

Voice

- 1 Heidi Berthold-Riess
- 2 Eberhard Büchner
- 3 Siegfried Lorenz

Violin

- 1 Oleg Kagan
- 2 Christian Funke
- 3 Andras Kiss

=== 1972 ===
Piano

- 1 Winfried Apel
- 2 Jean-Louis Steuermann
- 3 Michail Petuchow
- 4 Gabriele Kupfernagel
- 5 Wadim Sacharow

Organ

- 1 Heribert Metzger
- 2 Istvan Ella
- 3 Hans Fagius
- 4 Friedrich Kircheis
- 5 Gottfried Preller

Harpsichord

- 1 Lionel Party
- 2 Armin Thalheim
- 3 Gyöngyver Szilvassy
- 4 Alexander Sung
- 5 Magdalena Myczka

Voice – female

- 1 Rosemarie Lang
- 2 Regina Werner
- 3 Julianne Paszthy
- 4 Nadeshda Wainer

Voice – male

- 1 Dieter Weimann
- 2 Gheorghe-Emil Crasnaru
- 3 Peter Tschaplik
- 4 Frank-Peter Späthe

Violin

- 1 Wladimir Iwanow
- 2 Konrad Other
- 3 Lidija Schutko

=== 1976 ===
Piano

- 1 Mikhail Volchok
- 2 Larissa Dedowa
- 3 Dietmar Nawroth
- 4 Konstantin Preda
- 5 Emma Tachmisjan

Organ

- 1 Elisabeth Ullmann
- 2 Joachim Dalitz
- 3 Hartmut Rohmeyer
- 4 Matthias Eisenberg
- 5 Thomas Sauer

Voice – female

- 1 Carola Nossek
- 2 Katalin Pitti
- 3 Nannita Peschke
- 4 Ursula Ankele-Fischer

Voice – male

- 1 Waldemar Wild
- 2 Gábor Németh
- 3 Frieder Lang
- 4 Miloslav Podalsky

Violin

- 1 Nilla Pierrou
- 2 Thorsten Rosenbusch
- 3 Daniel Phillips
- 4 Ralf-Carsten Brömsel
- 5 René Henriot

Cello

- 1 Alexander Rudin
- 2 Yvan Chiffoleau
- 3 Josef Feigelson
- 4 Tamas Koó
- 5 Akiko Kanamaru

=== 1980 ===
Piano

- 1 Anaid Nersesjan
- 2 Kei Itoh
- 3 Irina Berkowitsch
- 4 Bair Schagdaron
- 5 Gerald Fauth

Organ

- 1 Zsuzsana Elekes
- 2 Jaroslav Tůma
- 3 Kristiane Köbler
- 4 Bernhard Buttmann
- 5 Matthias Süß

Voice – female

- 1 Jadwiga Rappé
- 2 Liliana Bizineche
- 3 Monika Straube
- 4 Gabriele Pietschnigg

Voice – male

- 1 Yukio Imanaka
- 2 Andreas Sommerfeld
- 3 Christoph Rösel
- 4 Andreas Scheibner

Violin

- 1 Michael Erxleben
- 2 Thorsten Janicke
- 3 Waltraut Wächter
- 4 Carlos Egry-Bulnes
- 5 Dora Bratschkowa

Cello

- 1 Kerstin Feltz
- 2 Marin Cazacu
- 3 Michael Nellessen
- 4 Thomas Ahrndt
- 5 Matthias Bräutigam

=== 1984 ===
Piano

- 1 Alexander Paley
- 2 Susanne Grutzmann
- 3 Noriko Kodama
- 4 Walery Pjasetzkij
- 5 Ueli Wiget
- 6 Eliso Bolkwadse
- 7 Lora Dimitrova
- 8= Dirk Fischbeck
- 8= Chihiro Kawahara
- 8= Katrin Arzberger

Organ

- 1 John Gavin Scott
- 2 Christoph Mehner
- 3 Michael Schönheit
- 4 Arvid Gast
- 5 Rainer Maria Rückschloß
- 6 Kayo Ohara
- 7 Martin Sander
- 8 John Butt

Voice – female

- 1 Angela Liebold
- 2 Bettina Denner-Deckelmann
- 3 Constanta Adriana Mestes
- 4 Ute Selbig
- 5 Maria Ardo
- 6 Ingrid Kertesi

Voice – male

- 1 Egbert Junghanns
- 2 Kenzo Ishii
- 3 Ralph Eschrig
- 4 Mario Hoff
- 5 hans-Peter Bartels
- 6 Reinhart Groschel

Violin

- 1 Johannes Ludwig Von Schwartz
- 2 Birgit Jahn
- 3 Anna Rabinova
- 4 Lothar Strauß
- 5 Kai Vogler
- 6 Sylvia-Elisabeth Viertel
- 7 Thomas Bottcher
- 8 Juri Merschewskij

Flute

- 1 Wolfgang Ritter
- 2 Monika Hegedüs
- 3 Matthias Rust
- 4 Alison Mitchell
- 5 Karin Beck
- 6 Urszula Janik
- 7 Janos Balint
- 8 Keigo Mori

=== 1988 ===
Piano

- 1 Gerald Fauth
- 2 Nikolai Lugansky
- 3 Alexej Botowinow
- 4 Albrecht Hartmann
- 5 Megumi Hashiba
- 6 Dana Sasinowa

Organ

- 1 Martin Sander
- 2 Stefan Kircheis
- 3 Wolfgang Kläsener
- 4 Valter Savant-Levet
- 5 Andreas Strobelt
- 6 Markus Lang

Voice – female

- 2 Kerstin Klesse
- 3 Katherina Müller
- 4 Naomi Tsuji
- 5 Reinhild Wäntig
- 6 Bożena Harasimowicz

Voice – male

- 2 Matthias Bleidorn
- 3 Frank Schiller
- 4 Daniel Kaleta
- 5 Torsten Frisch
- 6 Fred Hoffmann

Violin

- 1 Antje Weithaas
- 2 Katrin Scholz
- 3 Kazimierz Olechowski
- 4 Hiroko Suzuki
- 5 Marat Bisengaliew
- 6 Denitza Kazakova

Cello

- 1 Marc Coppey
- 2 Michael Sanderling
- 3 Raphaël Pidoux
- 4 Anton Istomin
- 5 Sybille Hesselbarth
- 6 Friedemann Ludwig

=== 1992 ===
Piano

- 2 Ragna Schirmer
- 3 Juri Bogdanov
- 4 Yukiyo Endo
- 5 Anna Schibaeva Belo

Organ

- 2 Luca Antoniotti, Michael Bloss
- 3 Valter Savant-Levet

Harpsichord

- 2 Daniela Numico
- 3 Anikó Soltész, Mechthild Stark
- 4 Akiko Kuwagata
- 6 Agnes Várallyay

Violin

- 1 Rachel Barton
- 2 Thomas Timm, Axel Strauß
- 4 Albrecht Winter

Voice – female

- 1 Bogna Bartosz
- 2 Yvonne Albes
- 3 Alla Simonichvili
- 4 Antje Perscholka
- 5 Bettine Eismann
- 6 Irina Potapenko

Voice – male

- 2 Jochen Kupfer
- 4 Dietrich Greve

=== 1996 ===
Piano

- 2 Cornelia Herrmann
- 3 Christopher Hinterhuber

Organ

- No prize awarded

Harpsichord

- 3 Giampietro Rosato

Violin

- 2 Natsumi Tamai
- 3 Amanda Favier, Aki Sunahara

Voice – female

- 2 Klaudia Zeiner, Simone Kermes, Anne Buter

Voice – male

- 1 Christoph Genz
- 2 Ekkehard Abele
- 3 Ralf Ernst, Marcus Volpert

=== 1998 ===
Piano

- 2 Ragna Schirmer
- 3 Miku Nishimoto-Neubert, Mari Kokuho

Cello

- 1 Emil Rovner
- 2 Renaud Déjardin
- 3 Ophélie Gaillard

Voice – female

- 1 Asako Motojima
- 2 Letizia Scherrer
- 3 Konstanze Maxsein

Voice – male

- 1 Jan Kobow
- 2 Andreas Post, Matthias Vieweg
- 3 Marcus Niedermeyr

=== 2000 ===
Harpsichord

- 2 Wiebke Weidanz, Pieter-Jan Belder
- 3 Philippe Leroy

Organ

- 1 Johannes Unger
- 2 Gunther Rost
- 3 Yuichiro Shiina

=== 2002 ===
Piano

- 1 Martin Stadtfeld
- 2 Andrew Brownell, Eric Fung

Violin and Baroque violin

- 2 Laura Vikman
- 3 Sonja Starke

Voice – female

- 1 Franziska Gottwald
- 2 Sigrid Horvath
- 3 Barbara Tišler

Voice – male

- 1 Dominik Wörner
- 2 Daniel Johannsen
- 3 Seung-Hee Park

=== 2004 ===
Cello and Baroque cello

- 1 Olivier Marron
- 2 Adam Mital
- 3 Richard Harwood

Voice

- 1 Julius Pfeifer
- 2 Trine Wilsberg Lund
- 3 Markus Flaig

Organ

- 1 Jörg Halubek
- 2 Elke Eckerstorfer
- 3 Frédéric Champion

=== 2006 ===
Harpsichord

- 1 Francesco Corti
- 2 Ilpo Laspas
- 3 François Guerrier

Piano

- 1 Irina Zahharenkova
- 2 Varvara Nepomnyashchaya
- 3 Elena Vorotko

Violin and Baroque violin

- 1 Elfa Rún Kristinsdóttir
- 2 Mayumi Hirasaki
- 3 Dmitry Sinkovsky

=== 2008 ===
Organ

- 1 Bálint Karosi
- 2 Ilpo Laspas
- 3 Lukas Stolhof

Voice

- 1 Marie Friederike Schoder
- 2 Margot Oitzinger
- 3 Jens Hamann

Cello and Baroque cello

- 1 Philip Higham
- 2 Toru Yamamoto
- 3 Davit Melkonyan

=== 2010 ===
Piano

- 1 Ilya Poletaev
- 2 Stepan Simonian
- 3 Ekaterina Richter

Harpsichord

- 1 Maria Uspenskaya
- 2 Magdalena Malec
- 3 Nadja Lesaulnier

Violin and Baroque violin

- 1 Evgeny Sviridov
- 2 Shunsuke Sato
- 3 Friederike Starkloff

=== 2012 ===
Organ

- 1. Johannes Lang
- 2. Sebastian Küchler-Blessing
- 3. Matthias Neumann

Voice

- 1. Dávid Szigetvári
- 2. Benno Schachtner
- 3. Matthias Winckhler

Cello and Baroque cello

- 1. Beiliang Zhu
- 2. Ditta Rohmann
- 3. Clara Pouvreau

=== 2014 ===
Piano

- 1. Hilda Huang, United States
- 2. Schaghajegh Nosrati, Germany
- 3. Georg Kjurdian, Latvia

Harpsichord

- 1. Jean-Christophe Dijoux, France
- 2. Olga Pashchenko, Russia
- 3. Alexandra Nepomnyashchaya, Russia

Violin and Baroque violin

- 1. Seiji Okamoto, Japan
- 2. Marie Radauer-Plank, Austria
- 3. Niek Baar, Netherlands

=== 2016 ===
Organ

- 1. Kazuki Tomita, Japan
- 2. Pavel Svoboda, Czech Republic
- 3. Alina Nikitina, Russia

Voice

- 1. Patrick Grahl, Tenor, Germany
- 2. Raphael Höhn, Tenor, Switzerland
- 3. Geneviève Tschumi, Contralto, Switzerland

Cello and Baroque cello

- 1. Paolo Bonomini, Cello, Italy
- 2. Ursina Braun, Cello, Switzerland
- 3. Vladimir Waltham, Baroque cello, France/United Kingdom

=== 2018 ===
Piano

- 1. Rachel Naomi Kudo (US)
- 2. Arash Rokni (Iran)
- 3. Jonathan Ferrucci (Australia/Italy)

Harpsichord

- 1. Avinoam Shalev (Israel)
- 2. Andrew Rosenblum (US)
- 3. Anastasia Antonova (Russia)

Violin

- 1. Maria Włoszczowska (Poland)
- 2. Maia Cabeza (US/Canada)
- 3. Hed Yaron Meyerson (Germany/Israel) Baroque violin

=== 2020 ===
The 2020 Competition in Leipzig has been canceled due to the Corona crisis.

2022

Piano

- 1. Olga Davnis (Russia)
- 2. Mattia Fusi (Italy)
- 3. Eden Agranat Meged (Israel)

Harpsichord

- 1. Alexander von Heißen (Germany)
- 2. Irene González Roldán (Spain)
- 3. Dmytro Kokoshynskyy (Ukraine)

Violin/Baroque Violin

- 1. Charlotte Spruit (Netherlands)
- 2. Qingzhu Weng (China)
- 3. Sophia Prodanova (Bulgaria)
