= 1948 in Germany =

- Decades: 1920s; 1930s; 1940s; 1950s; 1960s
- See also: Other events of 1948; History of Germany • Timeline • Years

Events in the year 1948 in Germany.

== Events ==
- March 1 - Bank deutscher Länder was founded.
- April 3 - Westdeutsche Allgemeine Zeitung is first published.
- April 5 - The 1948 Gatow air disaster was a mid-air collision in the airspace above Berlin, Germany that occurred on 5 April 1948.
- June 24 - The Berlin Blockade started.
- August 1 - German magazine Stern was founded.
- October 2 - Hessischer Rundfunk started.
- IG Farben Trial
- Krupp Trial
- Pohl trial

== Births ==
- January 16 - Gregor Gysi, German politician
- February 16 - Harald Range, German lawyer (died 2018)
- February 26 - Günther Denzler, German politician
- March 9 - Wolfgang Wieland, German lawyer and politician (died 2023)
- March 27 - Edgar Selge, German actor
- April 5 – Gisela Biedermann, Liechtensteiner physician and politician
- April 10 - Bernd Clüver, German singer (died 2011)
- April 12 - Joschka Fischer, German politician
- April 14 - Peter Urban, German radio journalist
- April 21 - Dieter Fromm, German athlete
- May 17 - Winfried Kretschmann, German politician
- May 25 - Klaus Meine, German singer
- May 31 - Jürgen Stark, German economist
- June 6 - Jürgen Marcus, German singer (died 2018)
- June 8
  - Jürgen von der Lippe, German comedian and actor
  - Hans-Josef Becker, German bishop of Roman Catholic Church
- June 20 - Johannes Friedrich, German Lutheran bishop
- June 30 - Wolf Erlbruch, German writer and children's book illustrator (died 2022)
- July 18 - Hartmut Michel, German biochemist, Nobel Prize in Chemistry laureate
- July 22 - Otto Waalkes, German comedian
- July 31 - Heinz Buschkowsky, German politician
- August 5 - Karlheinz Smieszek, German sport shooter
- September 1 - Jürgen Fitschen, German banker
- September 2 – Manfred Böckl, German novelist and popular historian (died 2026)
- October 28 - Wolfgang Ritter, German biologist
- November 4 - Claus Richter, German journalist
- November 16 - Norbert Lammert, German politician
- November 23 - Gabriele Seyfert, German figure skater
- November 24 - Christoph Bergner, German politician
- December 2
  - Reinhard Höppner, German politician
  - Christine Westermann, German journalist
  - Gebhard Fürst, German bishop of Roman Catholic Church
- December 6 - Marius Müller-Westernhagen, German singer
- December 20 - Beatrice Richter, actress and comedian

== Deaths ==
- 12 January - Albert Grzesinski, German politician (born 1879)
- 5 February - Johannes Blaskowitz, German general (born 1898)
- 9 February — Karl Valentin, German actor and comedian (born 1882)
- 14 February - Conrad Gröber, German bishop of Roman Catholic Church (born 1872)
- 16 February — Richard von Kühlmann, German diplomat and industrialist (born 1873)
- 10 April - Wilhelm Külz, German politician (born 1875)
- 2 May - Wilhelm von Opel, German automotive pioneer (born 1871)
- 2 June - Karl Brandt, German physician (born 1904)
- 25 June - Hans von Opel, German industrialist (born 1889)
- 27 June - Wilhelm Sauter, German painter (born 1896)
- 9 August — Hugo Boss, German fashion designer (born 1885)
- 13 September - Paul Wegener, German actor (born 1874)
- 3 October — Alois Wolfmüller, German engineer (born 1864)
- 9 October — Alfred Roth, German politician and writer (born 1879)
- 18 October - Walther von Brauchitsch, German field marshal (born 1881)
- 25 October — Walter Bock, German chemist (born 1895)
- 5 November - Hans Schrader, German archaeologist (born 1869)
- 10 November - Julius Curtius, German politician (born 1877)
- 28 November - Will Dohm, German actor (born 1897)
