= David Geringas =

Lithuanian cellist and conductor (born 1946)

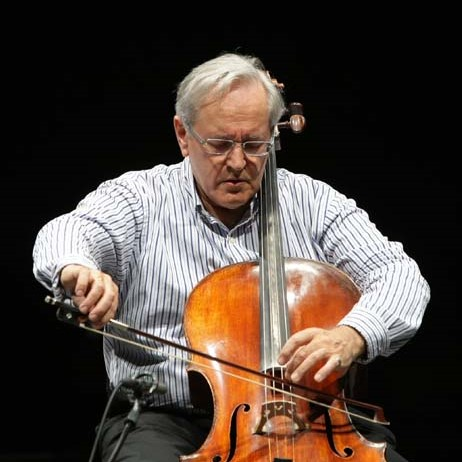
- Geringas performing at The 4th 1000 Cellists Concert.
- Born: David Geringas; 29 July 1946 (age 80); Vilnius, Lithuania
- Occupation: Cellist
- Years active: 1970s-present
- Awards: Echo Klassik (2013, 2014); BVO; MKM (2008); ITC (1970)
- Website: geringas.de

David Geringas (Lithuanian: Davidas Geringas; born 29 July 1946) is a Lithuanian cellist and conductor. He was taught by Mstislav Rostropovich and has performed and conducted in many notable orchestras. He is based and teaches in Berlin.

== Biography ==
David Geringas was born in Vilnius, Lithuania, under the control of the Soviet Union. He began to learn the cello at a young age at the National M. K. Čiurlionis School of Art. Later, he attended at the Moscow Conservatory from 1963 until 1973 under Mstislav Rostropovich, during which he, in 1970, won the First Prize and the gold medal at the International Tchaikovsky Competition. In 1975, Geringas moved to West Germany, and began his career, appearing in many orchestras. Since 2000, he has taught the cello at the Hanns Eisler Academy of Music. Geringas has been Chief Guest Conductor of the Kyushu Symphony Orchestra since 2005.

== Discography ==
For about 50 CDs which David Geringas has up to now recorded he received a large number of distinctions, among them the Grand Prix du Disque for the recording of the 12 cello concerti by Luigi Boccherini. His extensive discography also includes many award-winning recordings such as the chamber music by Henri Dutilleux (Diapason d'Or) or the cello concertos by Hans Pfitzner (Jahrespreis der Deutschen Schallplattenkritik).

- Eli Zion – from St. Petersburg to Jerusalem
  Musik der Neuen Jüdischen Schule für Cello und Klavier
  Works by:
  Joseph Achron, Ernst Bloch, Sinowi Feldman, Solomon Rosowsky, Lazare Saminsky, Joachim Stutschewsky, Leo Zeitlin
  with Jascha Nemtsov, piano
- Tschaikowsky-Variationen
  Tchaikovsky, Arensky
  David Geringas, conductor and cellist
  Südwestdeutsches Kammerorchester Pforzheim
- J. S. Bach, 6 Suites for Cello (1995)
- Bach (1989)
  Suite No. 1
  Suite No. 2
  Suite No. 6
- Bach (1989)
  Suite No. 3
  Suite No. 4
  Suite No. 5
- Quasi Improvisata (2003)
  Anatolijus Senderovas - Songs of Sulamite
  Sofia Gubaidulina - In Croce
  Lepo Sumera - Quasi Improvisata
  Eduardas Balsys - Habanera
  Ástor Piazzolla - Tanti Anni Prima, Oblivion, Hommage à Liège
  with Geir Draugsvoll, bayan
- Mozartiana - Hommage à Mozart (1992)
  Mozart - Andantino for piano and cello, K.Anh. 46
  Beethoven - Seven variations in E-flat major for cello and piano
  "Bei Männern, welche Liebe fühlen" from Mozart's The Magic Flute
  Helene Liebmann - "Grande Sonate pour Pianoforte et Violincelle" in B-flat major, Op. 11
  Beethoven - Twelve variations in F major, Op. 66 for cello and piano
  "Ein Mädchen oder Weibchen" from Mozart's The Magic Flute
  Joseph Wölfl - "Grand Duo pour Piano et Violoncelle" in D minor, Op. 31
  Franz Xaver Mozart - From the Grand Sonata for piano and cello, Op. 19
  with Tatjana Schatz, piano
- Boccherini - 12 Concerti per il Violoncello (1988)
  Concerto No. 1 in E-flat major, G 474
  Concerto No. 2 in A major, G 475
  Concerto No. 3 in D major, G 476
  Concerto No. 4 in C major, G 477
  Concerto No. 5 in D major, G 478
  Concerto No. 6 in D major, G 479
  Concerto No. 7 in G major, G 480
  Concerto No. 8 in C major, G 481
  Concerto No. 9 in B-flat major, G 482
  Concerto No. 10 in D major, G 483
  Concerto No. 11 in C major, G 573
  Concerto No. 12 in E-flat, major
  Orchestra da Camera di Padova e del Veneto
  Conductor: Bruno Giuranna
- Brahms - Double Concerto for violin, cello and orchestra, in A minor, Op. 102 (1989)
  Symphony No. 4 in E minor, Op. 98
  Mark Kaplan, violin
  Sinfonieorchester des Südwestfunks Baden-Baden
  Conductor: Michael Gielen
- Solo for Tatjana (1997)
  György Ligeti - Sonata for cello solo
  Gerhard Schedl - from "Zwei Stücke aus der Schatz-Truhe"
  Viktor Suslin - Schatz-Island
  Krzysztof Meyer - Monolog
  Anatolijus Senderovas - Due Canti
  Pēteris Vasks - Gramata cellam
  Paul Hindemith - Sonata for cello solo, Op. 25, No. 3
  Pablo Casals - Cant dell Ocells
- Dvořák (2003)
  Cello Concerto in B minor, Op. 104, B. 191
  Rondo in G minor, Op. 94, B. 181
  Silent Woods, B. 182
  Czech Philharmonic Orchestra
  Conductor Ken-Ichiro Kobayashi
- Ali Baba and the Forty Thieves (1997)
  Musical fairytale from the "Thousand and One Nights"
  Narrator: Manfred Steffen
  Music: Alexander Geringas
  Violin: Natalia Prishepenko
  Flute: Wolfgang Ritter
  Piano/song: Alexander Geringas
  Bass: Johannes Huth
  Drums: Martin Engelbach
- Gubaidulina (2000)
  "Und: Das Fest ist in vollem Gang"
  Badische Staatskapelle Karlsruhe
  Conductor: Kazushi Ono
- Haydn (1994)
  Cello Concerto in C major, Hob. VIIb-1
  Ceccl Concerto in D major, Hob. VIIb-2
  Andante from Symphony No. 13 for Cello and Orchestra
  Czech Philharmonic Chamber Orchestra
- My recollections (2002)
  Vytautas Barkauskas - Suites de concert, Op. 98
  Bronius Kutavicius - Rhythmus-Arhythmus
  Anatolijus Senderovas - Due canti
  with Tatjana Schatz-Geringas, piano
  Osvaldas Balakauskas - Dal vento
  Mindaugas Urbaitis - Reminiscences
  with Petras Geniusas, piano
- Pfitzner (1993)
  Cello Concerto in A minor, Op. 52
  Cello Concerto in G major in one movement, Op. 42
  Cello Concerto in A minor, Op. posth.
  Bamberg Symphony Orchestra
  Werner Andreas Albert
- David Geringas * Tatjana Schatz (1994)
  Dmitri Shostakovich - Sonata, Op. 40
  Prokofiev
  Sonata, Op. 119
  Adagio from Cinderella, Op. 97a
  Mstislav Rostropovich - Humoreske, Op. 5
  Tatjana Schatz, Piano
- Schnittke (1998–99)
  Epilogue from the ballet "Peer Gynt"
  Musica nostalgica
  Cello Sonata No. 1
  Tatjana Schatz, Piano
- Piano Trios
  Mieczyslaw Weinberg - Piano Trio, Op. 24
  Alexander Weprik - Drei Volkstänze, Op. 13b
  Dmitri Shostakovich - Piano Trio, Op. 67
  Dmitry Sitkovetsky, Violin
  Jasha Nemtsov, Piano
- David Geringas * Tatjana Schatz (1994)
  Schumann
  Adagio and Allegro, Op. 70
  Fantasiestücke, Op. 73
  Stücke im Volkston, Op. 102
  Schubert
  Arpeggione Sonata in A minor, D. 821
  Tatjana Schatz, piano
- David Geringas * Tatjana Schatz (1993)
  Richard Strauss
  Cello Sonata, Op. 6
  Romance in F Major
  Erwin Schulhoff - Cello Sonata, Op. 17
  Tatjana Schatz, piano
- Anatolijus Senderovas (2002)
  Concerto in Do
  Symphony Orchestra of the Lithuanian Academy of Music
  Robertas Servenikas, Conductor
- Lepo Sumera (2003)
  Cello Concerto
  Musica profana
  Symphony No. 6
  Estonian National Symphony Orchestra
  Paavo Järvi, Conductor
- Erkki-Sven Tüür
  Symphony No. 3
  Cello Concerto
  Lighthouse
  Radio-Symphonieorchester Wien
  Dennis Russell Davies, conductor
- Pēteris Vasks
  Cello Concerto
  String Symphony - Voices (Balsis)
  Riga Philharmonic Orchestra
  Jonas Dainius Aleksa, Conductor
- Schostakowitsch - Schulhoff
  Shostakovich - String Quartet No. 14
  with Gidon Kremer, Violin - Yuzuko Horigome, Violin - Kim Kashkashian, Viola
  Erwin Schulhoff - Sextet
  with Gidon Kremer, Violin - Philippe Hirschhorn, Violin - Nobuko Imai, Viola - Kim Kashkashian, Viola - Julius Berger, cello
  Erwin Schulhoff - Duo for Violin and Cello
  with Philippe Hirschhorn, Violin
- Krzysztof Meyer (2006)
  Canzona für Violoncello und Klavier
  with Tanja Schatz, Klavier

== Chamber music ==
Geringas performs frequently as a chamber musician, often collaborating with pianists Tatjana Geringas and Ian Fountain. In the season 2004/2005 David Geringas gave together with Ian Fountain a concert series entitled "Beethoven plus…" at the Philharmonie Berlin. He also works closely together with the Artemis Quartet, the Vogler Quartet and the Bläserquintett of the Staatskapelle Berlin.

== Conducting ==
David Geringas has conducted the Norddeutsche Philharmonie Rostock, the MDR Leipzig Radio Symphony Orchestra, the Jenaer Philharmonie, the Vienna Chamber Orchestra (Concert-Verein), the Danish National Symphony Orchestra/DR, das Iceland Symphony Orchestra, the Kremerata Baltica as well as orchestras in Lithuania, Italy, the Netherlands, Mexico and Costa Rica. In February 2007, David Geringas will conduct the Tokyo Philharmonic Orchestra for the first time, and give his debut as conductor in China in the 2007/2008 season.

For his first CD recording as conductor he received the 'Choc de la Musique' of the music magazine Le Monde de la musique.

Since 2005 David Geringas has been Chief Guest Conductor of the Kyushu Symphony Orchestra.

== Cello ==
David Geringas plays a G. B. Guadagnini cello made in 1761.

== Sources ==
- The Classical Music Guide Forums

== Bibliography ==
- Geringas, Tatjana (2020). In viaggio. Impressioni (in Italian). Varese: Zecchini Editore. ISBN 9788865402917.
- Geringas, David (2023). Non dirlo a nessuno. Memorie di un violoncellista. (in italian) Varese: Zecchini Editore. ISBN 978-88-6540-413-3.
