= Geringas =

Geringas is a surname. Notable people with the surname include:

- Alex Geringas (born 1971), German composer and songwriter
- David Geringas (born 1946), Lithuanian cellist and conductor
