= Daniel Ochoa =

German baritone (born 1979)

Daniel Ochoa (born 17 August 1979) is a German baritone.

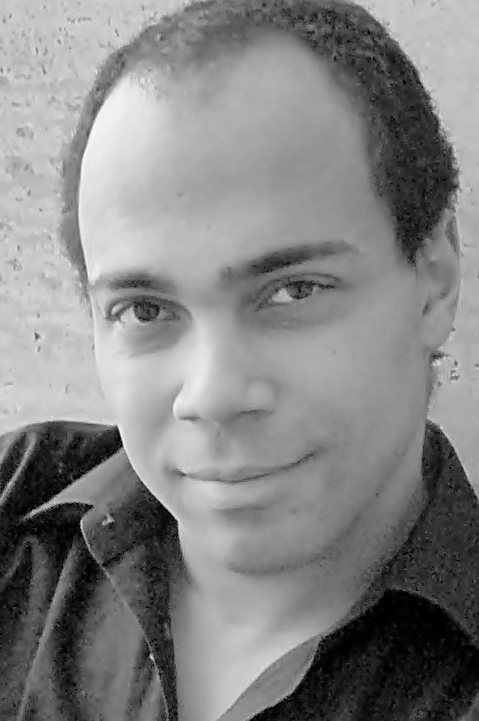
Daniel Ochoa 2011

== Life ==
Daniel Ochoa was born in 1979 and studied with Anthony Baldwin, Hans-Joachim Beyer, and Thomas Quasthoff. Among his additional teachers are Dietrich Fischer-Dieskau, Matthias Goerne, Rudolf Piernay, Christa Maria Ziese, and Michael Rhodes.

In 2003, Ochoa received the 1st prize at the Albert Lortzing Competition in Leipzig, and the following year was awarded a Richard Wagner Award scholarship.

As an opera singer he has appeared at various opera houses in roles including the title roles in Rossini's Il barbiere di siviglia, Mozart's Don Giovanni, Joseph Haydn's Lo Speziale

Ochoa has also performed as a soloist at the Berliner Philharmonie, the Semperoper Dresden, the Wiener Konzerthaus, the Leipzig Gewandhaus, the Dresdner Frauenkirche, the Konzerthaus at Berlin's Gendarmenmarkt, the Stiftskirche Stuttgart, the Izumi Hall in Osaka, the Hitomi Hall in Tokyo, International House of Music in Moscow and the Konzerthaus DeSingel in Antwerp and at festivals such as Lucerne Festival in Switzerland, the Leipzig Bach Festival, the Festival of Flanders, and the Dresden Days of Contemporary Music with the Leipzig Gewandhaus Orchestra, the Thomanerchor, the North German Radio Symphony Orchestra and the Dresden Philharmonic.

Some of Daniel Ochoa's additional musical partners are the Leipzig Gewandhaus Orchestra, the Radiophilharmonie des Norddeutschen Rundfunks, the Philharmonie Dresden, The Prague Symphony Orchestra, the Telemann Chamber Orchestra in Tokyo, the Berlin Lautten Compagney, the Leipzig Barockorchester, the Stuttgart Kammerchor, the Kreuzchor, the Thomanerchor, the Bachchor and the Staatskapelle Halle. He has collaborated with conductors like Helmuth Rilling, Reinhard Goebel, Thomaskantor Georg Christoph Biller, Kreuzkantor Roderich Kreile, Frieder Bernius, Howard Griffiths, Andreas Spering, Ludwig Güttler and Julia Jones.

Since the 2012–13 season, Daniel Ochoa is at the Vienna Volksoper as a permanent ensemble member.

== CD recordings ==
- 2004 17./18. Dresdner Tage der zeitgenössischen Musik 2003/2004
- 2009 Händel Haydn Mendelssohn – Die Musikjubiläen des Jahres 2009
- 2010 Johann W. Hertel "Die Geburt Jesu Christi"
- 2011 "150 Jahre Gewandhauschor"
- 2012 Ferdinand Hiller (1811–1885): Die Zerstörung Jerusalems
- 2012 Das Kirchenjahr mit Johann Sebastian Bach (N°1) – Advent

== Sources ==
- Coyne, Linda Pound (January 2008), "Pipings", The American Organist, Vol. 42, p. 90
- Rohland, Marion, "Sichtbare und hörbare Spielfreude", Mitteldeutsche Zeitung 1 January 2010 (accessed 28 June 2016 in German)
- Website of the Wiener Volksoper
- Das lange Interview mit Daniel Ochoa (Mephisto Radio, Mittwoch 02. Februar 2011)
- Bach Cantatas: Daniel Ochoa
