= Matthias Eisenberg =

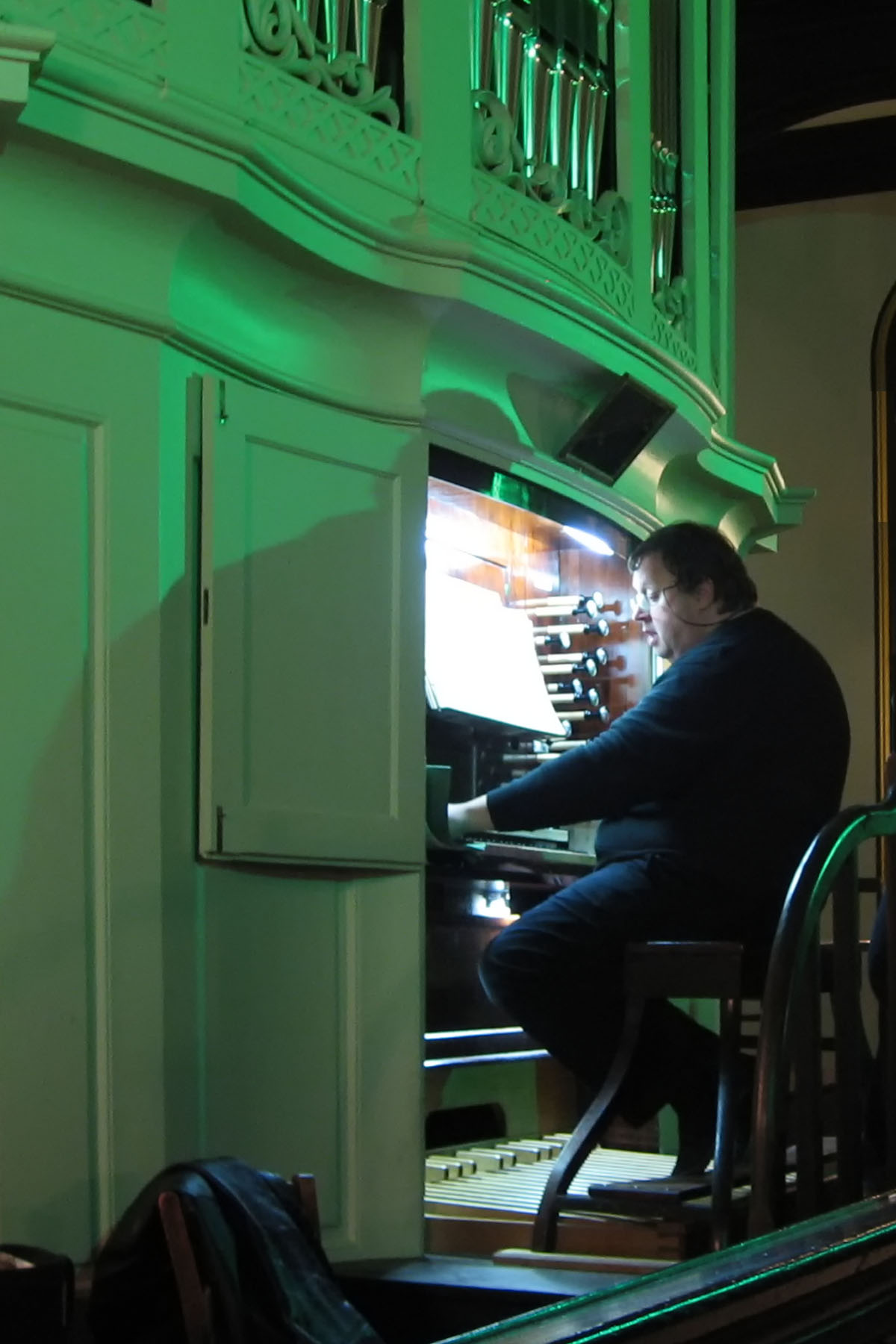
- Eisenberg at the organ of the Auferstehungskirche in Leipzig-Möckern, 2008
- Born: 15 January 1956 (age 69); Dresden
- Education: Musikhochschule Leipzig
- Occupations: Concert organist; Harpsichordist; Church musician; Organ expert
- Organizations: Gewandhausorchester; St. Severin, Keitum
- Awards: International Johann Sebastian Bach Competition; Honorary professor

Matthias Eisenberg (born 15 January 1956) is a German concert organist and harpsichordist, and a cantor. The award-winning player is known for performing concerts with clarinetist Giora Feidman. He has performed and conducted master classes internationally. He recorded, including the complete organ works by J. S. Bach and improvisations, and has conducted Bach cantatas from the harpsichord in collaboration with the Thomanerchor.

== Career ==
Born in Dresden, Eisenberg was organist at various churches beginning age nine. He was a member of the Dresdner Kreuzchor for five years. He studied in Leipzig at the Hochschule für Musik und Theater "Felix Mendelssohn Bartholdy" with Wolfgang Schetelich, completing the A-exam in 1978. During his studies, he was the winner of several international competitions, including the improvisation competition in Weimar. He won a prize of the International Johann Sebastian Bach Competition for organ in 1976.

In 1980, shortly before the completion of the new building of the Gewandhaus, Kurt Masur arranged for Eisenberg to be named organist of the Leipzig Gewandhausorchester. He also served as a harpsichordist of the Leipzig Bach Orchestra. He appeared on East German television in a production about the life of Johann Sebastian Bach. He appeared outside East Germany, in 1983 at the Bach Festival in Graz and in 1985 at the Internationale Bachakademie Stuttgart. In 1985 Eisenberg was a guest professor for organ at the International Music Seminar in Weimar. He also conducted master classes in Stockholm and Buenos Aires, among others.

In 1986 Eisenberg did not return from a tour to West Germany. After positions at churches in Bad Homburg and Hanover, he has performed as a freelance organist and harpsichordist and as a partner of chamber ensembles and symphony orchestras in cities across Europe, Asia, North and South America, and Australia. From 1992, Eisenberg was cantor at St. Severin in Westerland on Sylt. Since November 2004 he has been church musician and organist in Zwickau.

In January 2001, Eisenberg again appeared at the Gewandhaus, after an absence of 15 years. He performed at the Rheingau Musik Festival with clarinetist Giora Feidman in Eberbach Abbey.

As an organ specialist, Eisenberg has been involved in numerous new organs and renovations. He recorded the complete organ works by J. S. Bach at various organs in Lower Saxony. He has recorded as a partner of Mathias Schmutzler, Joachim Schäfer, and Giora Feidman, among others. Several of his CDs contain improvisations. As a conductor, he recorded Bach's secular cantata Mer hahn en neue Oberkeet, BWV 212 from the harpsichord, with soloists Juliane Claus, Martin Krumbiegel and Georg Christoph Biller in 1992, Bach's church cantata Ich armer Mensch, ich Sündenknecht, BWV 55 with Martin Petzold and members of the Thomanerchor in 1998, and songs from Schemellis Gesangbuch (Schemelli's Songbook) with Thomanerchor singers of two generations in 1998, playing the organ.

== Awards ==
In 2003 Eisenberg was appointed Kirchenmusikdirektor (church music director) in Hannover. Also in 2003, Schleswig-Holstein's Prime Minister Heide Simonis awarded him the honorary title of professor, for his outstanding contributions for organ music.
