= Sangidorjiin Sayantsetseg =

Mongolian pianist

Sangidorjiin Sayantsetseg (Mongolian: Сангидоржийн Саянцэцэг) is a Mongolian concert pianist and professor of music. She is the first Mongolian musician to perform as a solo artist at Carnegie Hall. She and her husband organized the biannual Ciudad de Huesca International Piano Competition in Spain, beginning in 1999. She is the president of the competition's jury.

Sayantsetseg was born in Ulaanbaatar, Mongolia. Her family was heavily involved in music and art; she began piano lessons at age five, studying with her father and mother.

After graduating from Music College in Ulaanbaatar, Sayantsetseg continued her piano studies at Tchaikovsky Academic Music College. Later, she began study at Tchaikovsky State Conservatory in Moscow, where she studied the tradition of Russian pianism from Tatiana Galitskaya, Nina Emelyanova, and Margarita Fyodorova.

During post-graduate studies at Madrid's Royal Conservatory under Guillermo González, she began studying Spanish music. Sayantsetseg has also been a strong advocate for the work of Mongolian composers, including her father, Choigiviin Sangidorj, and her brother, Sangidorjiin Sansargereltekh.
