= Giora Feidman =

Argentine-born Israeli clarinettist (born 1936)

Giora Feidman גיורא פיידמן
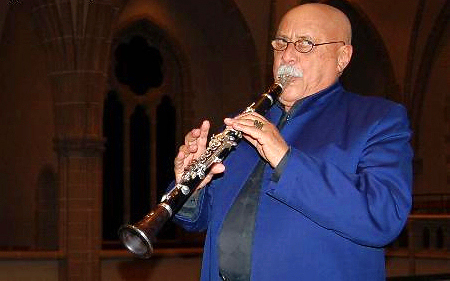
- Feidman in 2007

Background information
- Born: March 25, 1936 (age 90); Buenos Aires, Argentina
- Origin: Israel
- Genres: Klezmer
- Occupation: Clarinetist
- Instrument: Clarinet

Giora Feidman (Hebrew: גיורא פיידמן; born 25 March 1936) is an Argentine-born Israeli clarinetist who specializes in klezmer music. He played in notable symphony orchestras before embarking on a solo career.

== Biography ==
Giora Feidman was born in Buenos Aires, where his Bessarabian Jewish parents immigrated in 1905 from Chisinau to escape persecution.

Feidman comes from a family of klezmer musicians. His father, grandfather and great-grandfather made music for weddings, bar mitzvahs, and holiday celebrations in the shtetls of Eastern Europe. Feidman married Ora Bat-Chaim, his personal manager, in 1975.

== Music career ==
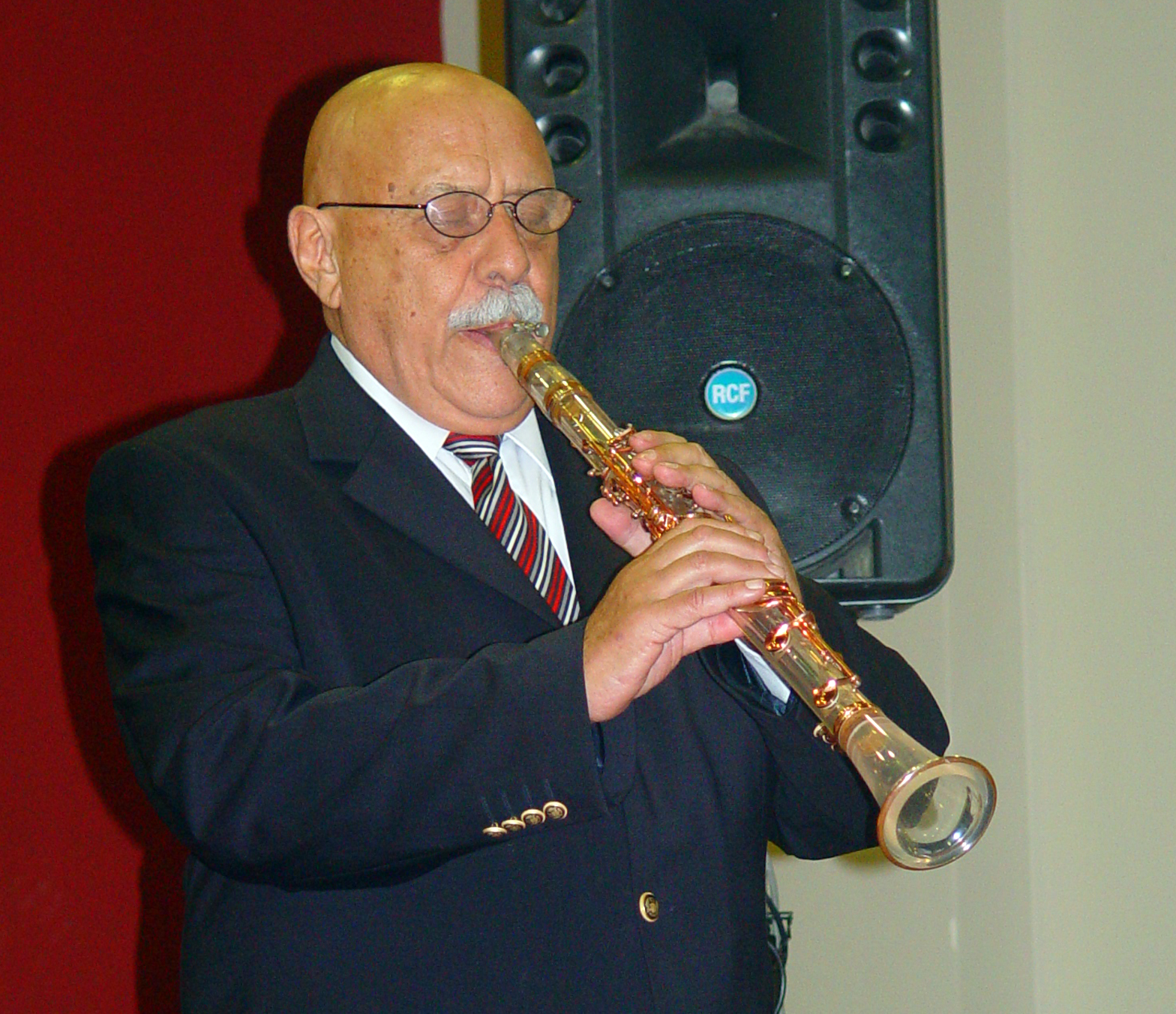
Feidman playing a lucite clarinet in Jerusalem, 2006

Feidman began his career in Buenos Aires as a member of the Teatro Colón Symphony Orchestra at age 18. Two years later he immigrated to Israel to become the youngest clarinetist ever to play with the Israel Philharmonic Orchestra, conducted by Zubin Mehta. He was a member of the orchestra for over 20 years. In the early 1970s he began his solo career. He has performed with the Berliner Symphoniker, the Kronos Quartet, the Polish Chamber Philharmonic, the Munich Chamber Philharmonic Orchestra, and the Munich Radio Orchestra. In 1974 the Israel Philharmonic Orchestra commissioned composer Misha Segal to write a concerto for clarinet and orchestra for Feidman. The one-movement piece, which was based on an original nigun, premiered that same year.

Movie director Steven Spielberg invited Feidman to play the clarinet solos for the soundtrack of Schindler's List, which won seven Academy Awards.

Feidman founded the "Clarinet and Klezmer in the Galilee" seminar and master class program, which takes place every year in Safed, Israel. He toured with solo programs wit organist Matthias Eisenberg.

== Discography ==
- Jewish Soul Music [מוסיקת נשמה] (1972)
- Nigunim of my People [הניגון שבלב] (1975)
- Long Live the Nigun [בקצב הניגון] (1977)
- The Art of the Klezmer (1979)
- The Incredible Clarinet (1983)
- Viva el Klezmer (1985)
- The Magic of the Klezmer (1986)
- The Singing Clarinet (1987)
- Clarinetango (1990)
- Gershwin & The Klezmer (1991)
- The Dance of Joy (1992)
- Klassic Klezmer (1993)
- Concert for the Klezmer (1993)
- Der Rattenfanger (1993)
- Prokofiev: Overture on Hebrew Themes for Clarinet, String Quartet and Piano, Op. 34, with the Juilliard String Quartet and Yefim Bronfman (May 18, 1994, Princeton, NJ) - Sony Classical
- Feidman in Jerusalem (1994)
- Klezmer Chamber Music (1995)
- The Soul Chai (1995)
- For You (1996)
- Schelomo/Barakashot (1996)
- Silence and Beyond — Feidman plays Ora Bat Chaim (1997)
- Feidman in Bayreuth — Lilith — Neun Gesänge der dunklen Liebe (1997)
- Soul Meditation, Harmony of Soul (1997)
- Der Golem — Feidman and the Arditti String Quartet (1997)
- Klezmer Celebration (1997)
- Feidman and Israel Camerata (1998)
- Feidman and Katja Beer — Schubert (1998)
- Journey (1999)
- And the Angels Sing (1999)
- Klezmer and More (2000)
- Rhapsody (2000)
- To Giora Feidman — Your Kletzmer Friends (2000)
- TangoKlezmer (2001)
- Dancing in the Field (2002)
- Feidman plays Piazzolla (2002)
- Love — Feidman plays Ora Bat Chaim (2003)
- Feidman Plays Mozart and More (2003)
- Safad — Feidman and The Safed Chamber Orchestra (2004)
- Ewigkeit dringt in die Zeit (2004)
- Wenn du singst, wie kannst du hassen? (2005)
- Feidman and Eisenberg — Live at St. Severin (2005)
- Crossing Borders (2006)
- Klezmundo (2006)
- Klezmer in the Galilee (2007)
- The Spirit of Klezmer (2008)
- Klezmer & Strings (2009)
- Very Klezmer (2012)
- Paul Celan - Zweistimmig (2013) - Feidman and Ben Becker
- Klezmer Bridges (2015) - Feidman and Rastrelli Cello Quartet
- Feidman plays Beatles! (2017) - Feidman and Rastrelli Cello Quartet
- A Tribute To Piazzolla (2021) - Feidman and Rastrelli Cello Quartet

== Films ==
- Jewish Soul Music: The Art of Giora Feidman (1980), directed by Uri Barbash
- Schindler's List (1993), directed by Steven Spielberg: the clarinet solos
- Beyond Silence (1996), directed by Caroline Link: as a guest appearance, playing himself
- Man Is a Woman (1998), directed by Jean-Jacques Zilbermann
