= Igor Lazko =

Russian musician

- Игорь Лазько
- Born: 1949 (age 76–77); Saint Petersburg
- Education: Saint Petersburg Conservatory
- Occupations: Classical pianist, performer, recording artist, teacher of pianists.

Igor Lazko (Russian: Игорь Лазько, Russian pronunciation: [ˈiɡər ˈlasʲkə]), (b. St Petersburg, 1949), is a Russian classical pianist who has made a distinguished international career as performer, recording artist and teacher of other pianists.

== Early career in Russia ==
Igor Lazko is descended from a family renowned for its musicians through several generations. When he was six years old, he was admitted to the special school for young musicians in the Rimsky-Korsakov Conservatory, where his professors were Pavel Serebryakov and Sophia Lekhovitskaya. He was profoundly affected by the example of Glenn Gould's playing during his tour in the Soviet Union in 1957, and from this and from Gould's recordings he drew a wealth of inspiration: the pianist describes this in a published article.

At a very young age, he displayed exceptional gifts and when only 14 he became the youngest laureate in the history of the Johann Sebastian Bach International Music Competition at Leipzig, receiving from them the bronze medal. Soon afterwards (in 1965), he recorded the Two- and Three-Part Inventions for the Russian Melodiya record label, the disc which launched his recording career.

His hard work and his exceptional talent opened for him the very finest teaching that Russia had to offer. He perfected himself at the higher Tchaikowsky Conservatory in Moscow in the class of Jakov Zak, successor of the master Heinrich Neuhaus, and took the First Prize in all his paths of study. From 1974 to 1977, he pursued a career as soloist and chamber musician in the Soviet Union, and was soloist with the Leningrad Philharmonic. In the USSR, he performed in duo with the cellist Alexey Lazko (appearing before the Leningrad Philharmonic Society in 1965), and in trio with Mirra Lvovna Furer-Lazko.

== Belgrade ==
From 1978 to 1992, he was professor at the University of Belgrade. In this period he recorded the six Partitas and the Goldberg Variations of J.S. Bach, as well as works of Tchaikovsky and of other composers. The concert which he dedicated to the memory of the Canadian pianist Glenn Gould was proclaimed 'the best interpretation of the 1982–1983 season' in Belgrade. Intensively engaged in the musical life of the country, his Belgrade Festival recital of 1987 consisted entirely of Serbian composers, while his 1989 recital was a Russian programme of Moussorgsky, Tchaikowsky ('The Seasons' op. 37, which he also recorded in Belgrade) and Rachmaninoff. His 1987 recital with violinist Črtomir Šišković also combined Bach, Mozart and Tchaikowsky. After winning the 1981 Contemporary Music Congress at Saint-Germain-en-Laye, his career also began to develop further in France. In 1985, at the 'Music Like Bach' Festival of Nanterre, he performed practically the complete klavier works of J.S. Bach.

== Range ==
Igor Lazko has worked with such orchestral directors as Yuri Temirkanov, Mariss Jansons, Vladislav Chernushenko and Valery Gergiev, with the Philharmonic Orchestras of Leningrad and Moscow, the National Chamber Orchestra of Canada, and with many European ensembles. Based in Paris since 1992, he continues to perform and teaches at the Schola Cantorum, at the National School of Music of Fresnes and in particular at the Russian Conservatory Alexandre Scriabin in Paris.

He is President Director of the Nikolai Rubinstein International Piano Concours (founded 1996) and is the Founder and President of the International Concours of the Conservatoire Russe Alexandre Scriabine (2001), in Paris. He is also associated with the Jūrmala (Latvia) International Academic Music Competition for pianists, which reached its 11th Season in 2010.

He is pianist of the Trio Mendelssohn, with violinist Alexandre Stajic and 'cellist Dorel Fodoreanu.

== Artistry ==
Igor Lazko is an artist, a pianist and a chamber-musician. The lyricism of his playing and his symphonic projection of sound, give authenticity to his interpretations.

== Recordings mentioned ==
- Two- and Three-Part Inventions (J S Bach). (Melodiya 10" 33D 19399/400)
- Concerto for piano and orchestra in F minor (J S Bach) with Leningrad Chamber Orchestra conducted by Yuri Temirkanov (1968).
- w. Alexey Lazko (cello): Works for piano and cello by Beethoven, Bach, Vivaldi, Brahms, Rachmananinoff, etc. 'Cellist's Golden Repertoire (2 CDs, published 2009). Kompozitor SPb CD 75.
- Goldberg Variations, Bach (Belgrade): PGP - Produkcija Gramofonskih Ploċa Radio-Televisije Beograd, SOKOJ RTB 2330172 (Sleevenotes April 1985, Issued 1987).
- Partitas, Bach (Belgrade): PGP RTB 3130096 (Issued 17 January 1985)
- The Seasons (Tchaikowsky), op 37a. PGP RTB 2130513.
- w. Črtomir Šiškovič (violin): Sonata in G minor 'Didone abbandonata' (Tartini) op. 1 no. 10; Suite no 1 (Švara Danilo); Sonatina in G major op. 100 (Antonín Dvořák). PGP RTB 230049; Jugoton LSY-66243.
- w. Alexandre Brussilovsky (violin): Sonata for violin and piano in A major (César Franck); Sonata for violin and piano in E flat major (Richard Strauss). Suoni e colori, ORCD 6712 (August 2000).
- w. A Brussilovsky (violin), Nathanaelle Marie, works by Khandoshkin, Afanassiev, Cui, Balakirev, Mussorgsky, Tchaikovsky, Taneyev, Arensky, Rachmaninoff, Efrem Zimbalist. Suoni e colori, 53005.
- w. A Brussilovsky (violin), Amaury Wallez (bassoon), Michel Lethiec (clar.), Glinka: Trio Pathetique in D min. Suoni e colori 53004.

== Sources and references ==
- Ghyslaine Guertin (Ed), Glenn Gould, Pluriel: Texts collected and presented by G. Guertin (at Conferences at Universities of Quebec and Montreal, 13–15 October 1987), including an article by Igor Lazko on Gould's 1957 Soviet tour. (Louise Courteau: Verdun, Quebec, 1988). ISBN 2-89239-063-X
- 2007 Forest Hill Musical Days programme note biography of Lazko
