= Marie Radauer-Plank =

Austrian classical violinist (born 1986)

Marie Radauer-Plank (born 1986) is an Austrian violinist.

== Life and career ==
Radauer-Plank was born in Salzburg, Austria, and began playing the violin at the age of three. Just seven years later she was a junior student at the Mozarteum University Salzburg. After her Matura, she took up studies in Hanover and Brussels, graduating in 2013 with the Konzertexamen. She studied with Lukas Hagen, Benjamin Schmid, Ulf Schneider and Augustin Dumay and with Reinhard Goebel in addition to baroque violin.

== Concert activity ==
While still a student, Radauer-Plank founded the Duo Brüggen-Plank together with the pianist Henrike Brüggen. The two musicians give numerous concerts at home and abroad. In 2017, the duo released the album Szymanowski: Works for Violin and Piano For the following album Enescu: Works for Violin and Piano (2019) the duo received a Supersonic Award in 2020 it was also nominated for an Opus Klassik and an International Classical Music Awards nominated. Another CD is planned for 2020, featuring works by Jan Václav Voříšek, Archduke Rudolf of Austria and Ludwig van Beethoven.

In addition to her chamber music concert activities, Radauer-Plank is also active as a soloist. She has performed with the Münchner Rundfunkorchester, the Stuttgarter Kammerorchester, the Folkwang Kammerorchester Essen, the Bayerische Kammerphilharmonie and the "Orchestra della Accademia Mahler". Radauer-Plank has also performed in various baroque ensembles, including the Ensemble Diderot and the Ensemble Concerto Melante.

Radauer-Plank has won prizes at various international competitions. These include the International Johann Sebastian Bach Competition 2014 the 2012 competition of the Kulturkreis der deutschen Wirtschaft and the International Louis Spohr Competition Weimar At a young age, she won many awards at the Austrian youth music competitions Prima la musica and Gradus. Radauer-Plank plays on a Dom Amati from 1746.

== Recordings ==
- Szymanowski: Works for Violin & Piano (2017). Duo Brüggen-Plank. Issued by Genuin.
- Enescu: Works for Violin & Piano (2019). Duo Brüggen-Plank. Issued by Genuin.
