= Elfa Rún Kristinsdóttir =

Icelandic name (born 1985)

Elfa Rún Kristinsdóttir (born 1985) is an Icelandic violinist. She is widely known for her interpretations, especially of Baroque music.

Elfa Rún came to international prominence through her victory at the International Johann Sebastian Bach Competition in Leipzig in 2006, where she won the Grand Prize, the Audience Prize and a special prize awarded to the youngest finalist. Elfa Rún has also won several awards at the Icelandic Music Awards, including the Performer of the Year award in 2012 and the Album of the Year award in 2015 for her recording of the works of Georg Philipp Telemann. Elfa Rún was nominated for the Nordic Council Music Prize in 2015 and again in 2023. Her work in historically informed performance of Baroque music has been well received, and she is an active member of Akademie für Alte Musik Berlin. She has also appeared as soloist with the Iceland Symphony Orchestra, Les Siècles, and the Hamburger Symphoniker. After finishing her studies in her native Iceland with a diploma from Iceland Academy of the Arts, Elfa studied in Freiburg and Leipzig under the tutelage of Rainer Kussmaul and Carolin Widmann.

Elfa Rún has recorded several solo CDs, including Violin Concertos by J.S. Bach (with Kaleidoskop Soloists Ensemble, 2011) and the Telemann Fantasias for solo violin (2014).
