= Josef Feigelson =

Latvian-American cellist

Josef Feigelson (born 1954) is a concert cellist living in the United States.

== Biography ==
Feigelson was born in 1954 in Latvia. He is a former student of Mstislav Rostropovich and Natalia Gutman, and the winner of the International Tchaikovsky Competition and International Bach Competition. He performs as a soloist across the U.S. and Europe. Feigelson has recorded the unique 24 Preludes and four solo sonatas of Mieczysław Weinberg, among other music.

Since making his New York orchestral debut in 1988, when he stepped in on short notice to substitute for ailing violinist Nathan Milstein with the New York Chamber Symphony, Feigelson he has performed at virtually every major hall in New York City, as well as Orchestra Hall in Chicago and the Kennedy Center in Washington, D.C. He was guest soloist with the Pittsburgh Symphony, Detroit Symphony, Seattle Symphony, Chicago Sinfonietta, Brooklyn Philharmonic, Richmond Symphony, Charleston Symphony, and Knoxville Symphony among others. In 1990, the cellist received the Avery Fisher Career Grant given to outstanding instrumentalists.

In Europe, Feigelson has taken numerous tours of France, Germany and other Central and Eastern European countries, participating in the Schleswig-Holstein and Handelfestspiele festivals, the Tuscany Festival in Italy, Musiktreffen in St.Moritz, Switzerland, the Bach Festival in Madeira, the Rostropovich and Summertime festivals in Latvia, and many other orchestral and recital performances in the United Kingdom, Austria, Netherlands, Czech Republic, Israel, and the Baltic countries. Feigelson has also appeared on television and radio, including on NPR's Performance Today. His 1996 performance of the Dvořák Cello Concerto with the Detroit Symphony under Neeme Järvi was recorded for Eurobroadcast and aired on radio stations internationally.

Feigelson has collaborated with some of the world's best known musicians, such as soprano Barbara Hendricks, pianists Vladimir Feltsman and Bella Davidovich, violinist Oleh Krysa, violist Yuri Bashmet, and conductors Neeme Järvi, Gennady Rozhdestvennsky, Lukas Foss, Lawrence Foster, Gerard Schwarz, Andre Raphel Smith, David Amram and Moshe Atzmon. His repertoire includes more than 50 works for cello and orchestra, an equal amount of sonatas and other music including his own transcriptions. A fervent advocate of overlooked music, he made a 1996 world premiere of Mieczysław Weinberg's unique 24 Cello Preludes and subsequently recorded it along with the composer's Four Cello Sonatas for the Naxos label. In addition to performing, Feigelson has offered master classes for string players and ensembles at the Aspen Music Festival, Chautauqua Institution, Detroit Civic Orchestra, Rutgers University, Waterloo Festival, and other venues in the U.S. and abroad. He is a founder and artistic director of Kindred Spirits Arts Programs, Preludes of Pont-Aven, and The Stravinsky Circle.
