= Mindaugas Urbaitis =

Mindaugas Urbaitis (born 1952) is a Lithuanian composer. He was originally known as a radical minimalist, but began to use more recognisable musical quotes from the 1980s.
