= Miku Nishimoto-Neubert =

Japanese-German pianist

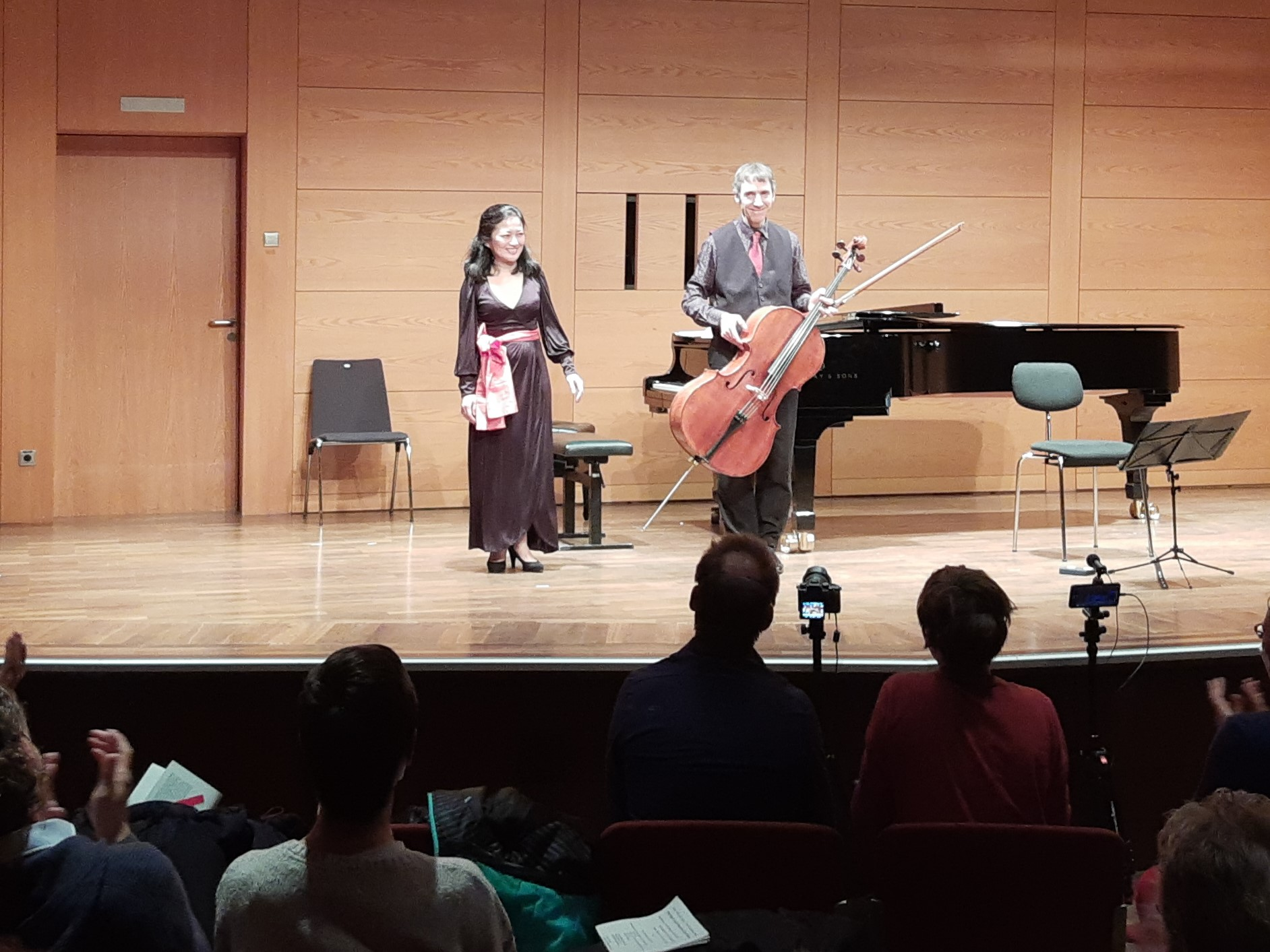
- The pianist with cellist Graham Waterhouse in 2022
- Born: Miku Nishimoto; Tokyo, Japan
- Education: Tokyo University of the Arts; Hochschule für Musik und Theater Hannover
- Occupations: Classical pianist; Academic teacher
- Organizations: Hochschule für Musik und Theater München
- Awards: Johann Sebastian Bach Competition

Miku Nishimoto-Neubert is a classical pianist.

Born in Tokyo, she studied at the Tokyo University of the Arts (Geidai). On a recommendation of Karl-Heinz Kämmerling she completed her studies in Hannover at the Hochschule für Musik und Theater, where she took the concert exam in 2001. She won awards in international competitions, including in 1994 a first prize at the Concurso Internacional de Musica da Cidade do Porto in Portugal, in 1997 a finalist prize at the Clara Haskil International Piano Competition in Vevey and a finalist prize at the Esther Honens International Piano Competition in Calgary, and in 1998 third prize at the Johann Sebastian Bach Competition in Leipzig. She has been teaching piano accompaniment at the Musikhochhschule in Munich from 2002.

The pianist is known as an accompanist and for collaboration in projects. She participated in a concert of the Hochschule to celebrate the 75th birthday of Wilhelm Killmayer with performances of his songs, recorded live on 17 November 2002. On 23 June 2013 she accompanied soprano Nadja Michael in a program Orlando Misterioso of staged songs by Richard Wagner, Robert Schumann, Hugo Wolf, Gustav Mahler, ending with "Morgen!" by Richard Strauss at the Theater an der Wien. On 18 January 2013 she was the pianist in the premiere of an interactive video opera by Helga Pogatschar for a performer and eight instrumentalists, based on Kafka's Das Schloss, performed in the Reaktorhalle München.

She recorded works by Johann Sebastian Bach, including his Chromatic Fantasia and Fugue, the Partitas No. 2 in C minor and No. 6 in E minor, the French Suite No. 5 in G major, BWV 816, and the Italian Concerto. Her playing has been described as avoiding a lyrical attitude, "moving between capricious high spirits and a meditative inwardness", adding that she "applies pedal mostly as a special effect, and each note in her melodic lines is distinct and perfectly articulated". She recorded Klavierstücke Op. 118 and Op. 119 by Johannes Brahms in 2013. She played works from her last CD at her debut concert in Berlin, at the Konzerthaus Berlin on 22 October 2013, along with Praeludium, Op. 32, by Graham Waterhouse and Mendelssohn's Variations sérieuses, Op. 54.

On 12 March 2022, she performed in the world premiere of Waterhouse's song-cycle Shravana at Kleiner Konzertsaal of the Gasteig, with mezzo-soprano Anna-Doris Capitelli and the composer as the cellist, in a program that also featured Alkan's Cello Sonata.
