= Cornelia Herrmann =

Austrian musician (born 1977)

Cornelia Hermann
- Born: 1977 (age 48–49); Salzburg, Austria
- Occupation: ClassicalPianist

Cornelia Herrmann (born in 1977) is an Austrian pianist.

== Life and career ==
Born in Salzburg, Herrmann comes from a Salzburg family of musicians. At the age of eight, she was admitted to the Mozarteum University Salzburg in the class of Anton Czjzek. Later she studied with Rohmann Imre in Salzburg and Noel Flores at the University of Music and Performing Arts Vienna. She received regular lessons from Ferenc Rados in Budapest and other coaching from Alexander Lonquich, Murray Perahia, András Schiff and Alfred Brendel. In 1996, Herrmann was the youngest finalist and winner of the International Johann Sebastian Bach Competition in Leipzig and in 1999 she won the special prize of the Internationaler Mozartwettbewerb Salzburg. In 2002, she made her debut at the Salzburg Festival and in 2003 conducted Mozart's recitative and rondo "Ch'io mi scordi di te?" for soprano with piano obbligato and orchestra with Elīna Garanča, Marcello Viotti and the Mozarteum Orchestra Salzburg.

Herrmann performed as a soloist with orchestras such as the Camerata Salzburg, the Mozarteum Orchestra Salzburg, the Bruckner Orchester Linz, the Vienna Chamber Orchestra, the NHK Symphony Orchestra, the Florida Orchestra, the MDR Sinfonieorchester, the Israel Chamber Orchestra and worked with the conductors Sir Roger Norrington, Manfred Honeck, Hubert Soudant, Sir Neville Marriner, James Judd, Pinchas Steinberg, Fabio Luisi, Lawrence Renes, Stefan Sanderling. She was a guest at festivals such as Styriarte, Grafenegg Festival, MDR Musiksommer, Festspiele Mecklenburg-Vorpommern, the Pacific Music Festival and played with Christian Altenburger, Mirijam Contzen, Sergey Malov, Patrick Demenga, Quirine Viersen, the Gewandhaus Quartet of Leipzig.

Herrmann lives in Vienna.

== Initiatives ==
She helped to create numerous "Word and Sound" projects with Cornelia Froboess (George Sand & Frédéric Chopin) Heinrich Heine & Robert Schumann, and Peter Simonischek (Thomas Bernhard: 'Meine Preise', Cécile and Felix Mendelssohn.

In May 2014, Herrmann started her own chamber music festival "Musiktage Hundsmarktmühle" at Lake Fuschlsee in Salzburg. The chamber music concerts take place in the hayloft of the 16th century Hundsmarktmühle. The music days are now held at the end of June.

== Discography ==
- Salut d'amour – Victor, VICC-60442 (2005)
- Schumann: Fantasiestücke, Op. 12 & Arabeske Op. 18 – Victor, VICC-60503 (2006)
- J. S. Bach: French Suites No. 1, No. 2, No. 5 & No. 6 – Camerata Tokyo, CMCD-25038 (2013)
- J. S. Bach: French Suites No. 3, No. 4 & Overture in the "French Style" - Camerata Tokyo, CMCD-25040 (2014)
- J. S. Bach: Italian Concerto⁣ – Camerata Tokyo, CMCD-25041 (2014)
- J. S. Bach: Partitas No. 2, No. 3 & No. 4 – Camerata Tokyo, CMCD-25043 (2016)
- J. S. Bach: Partitas No. 1, No. 5 & No. 6 – Camerata Tokyo, CMCD-25044 (2017)
