= Oleg Kagan =

Soviet violinist (1946–1990)

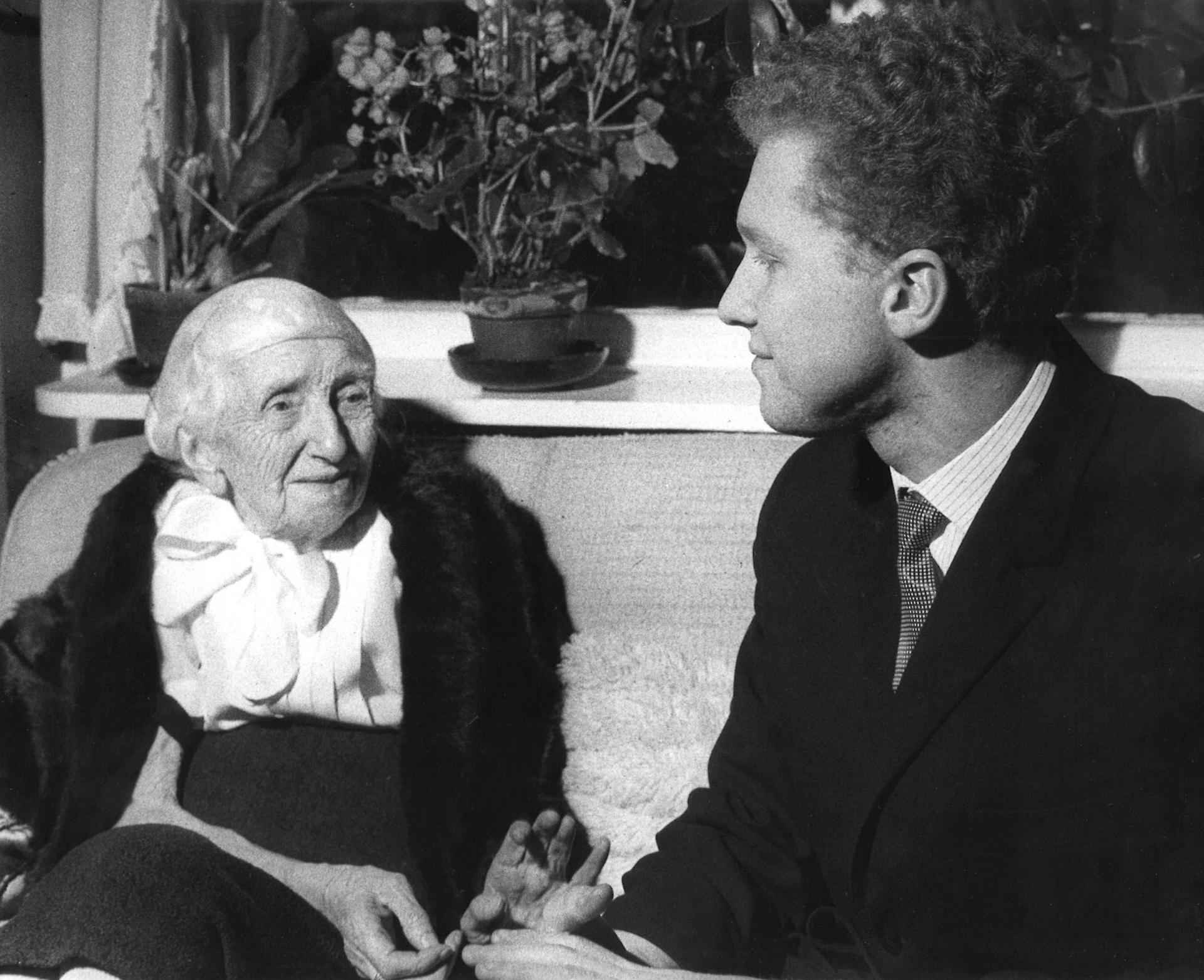
Oleg Kagan (right) meeting Mrs. Aino Sibelius at Ainola, Finland, 1965, on the 100th birthday of Jean Sibelius.

Oleg Moiseyevich Kagan (Russian: Оле́г Моисе́евич Кага́н; 22 November 1946 Yuzhno-Sakhalinsk, Russian SFSR – 15 July 1990, Munich, West Germany) was a Soviet violinist, known for his chamber collaborations with such musicians as pianist Sviatoslav Richter, Eliso Virsaladze and cellist Natalia Gutman, his wife. He was also a significant proponent of modern music, in particular Berg's Violin Concerto. Several recently released concert recordings have added to his posthumous reputation.

== Biography ==
Born in Sakhalin, Kagan was brought up in Riga following his family's relocation to the Latvian Soviet Socialist Republic in 1953. He began studying at the Latvian State Conservatory in Riga at age eight under Joachim Braun; five years later, he was taken to Moscow by violinist Boris Kuznetsov.

During the 1960s, he won the Sibelius and Bach Competitions, while also placing in the top-five of the Enescu and Tchaikovsky Competitions. Upon Kuznetsov's death, Kagan began studying with David Oistrakh, and in 1969, he began playing chamber music with Richter. Along with Richter and Gutman, Kagan also appeared frequently with pianist Vasily Lobanov, who would later dedicate a piece to him. With his second wife, cellist Natalia Gutman, he founded the Music Festival in 1990, which was renamed the Oleg Kagan International Music Festival after his death in 1992.

As Kagan seemed to be approaching the zenith of his career he became seriously ill with cancer in 1989. He had several surgeries, but struggled to remain active, touring Europe when he could and arranging festivals. Though his doctors at a hospital in Lübeck, Germany declared him too sick to be released, Kagan discharged himself to appear at his final festival, in Kreuth am Tegernsee, Bavaria. Shortly after giving two Mozart concerts there, where he had to be helped on-stage, he died on 15 July 1990, aged 43.

== Selected recordings ==
- J.S. Bach Violin Sonatas and Partitas, BWV 1001–1006, 1989, Release Date: 2008.
