= Bruce Abel =

American bass singer (1936–2021)

Bruce Abel (25 July 1936 – 10 March 2021) was an American bass singer.

== Biography ==
Abel studied singing at the Juilliard School of Music in New York City under Hans Heinz, where he excelled in studies of French art songs and German lieder. He won a Fulbright Fellowship in 1962 which enabled him to pursue further studies in the lieder and oratorio repertoire in Stuttgart, Germany with Hermann Reutter, Lore Fischer and Elinor Junker-Giesen. He went on to win several international singing competitions: Enrico Caruso Competition New York (1st prize, 1963), Concours International Geneva (1st prize, 1963), Mozart Wettbewerb Vienna (2nd prize, 1963), ARD International Music Competition (prize for Lied, 1964), International Johann Sebastian Bach Competition in Leipzig (1st prize, 1964).

He gained international fame during the 1960s and 1970s for his numerous appearances in concerts in Northern America and throughout Europe as well as singing on numerous recordings. He was notably a soloist in the 1971 world premiere of Fritz Werner’s Whitsun Oratorio in Heilbronn, Germany.

In 1974 he joined the voice faculty at the State University of Music and Performing Arts Stuttgart.

Bruce Abel was married to pianist Waltraud Poser and together they have a son Thomas Abel, percussionist.
