= Christa Maria Ziese =

German operatic soprano

Christa Maria Ziese (married name Christa Maria Ziese-Lüdeke; 13 July 1924 – 22 January 2012) was a German Lied, concert and operatic soprano.

== Leben ==
Ziese was born in Aschersleben. Her teachers were the pedagogues Gottlieb Zeithammer and Josef-Maria Hausschild in Leipzig. In 1949, she won the International Concours of Prague and in 1950, the third prize at the International Johann Sebastian Bach Competition in Leipzig.

She made her stage debut in 1947 at the Leipzig Opera as Hänsel in the opera Hänsel und Gretel and was then a member of this Opera house until 1951 and again from 1954 to 1977, but at the same time gave guest performances at the Berlin State Opera and Dresden as well as at the Komische Oper Berlin. In 1952-1954, she was engaged at the National Theatre in Weimar. Guest performances at the Bolshoi Theatre in Moscow, at the Deutsche Oper am Rhein, the Düsseldorf-Duisburg, at the opera houses of Hamburg, Hanover, Zurich, Brno and Nice followed.

Her large, expressive soprano voice achieved its best performances in the highly dramatic repertoire. She sang among others the part of Leonore in Fidelio, Santuzza in Cavalleria rusticana, Salome, Aida, Tosca, Carmen, Turandot by Puccini, Senta in the Flying Dutchman, Isolde, Venus in Tannhäuser.

She was awarded the title of Kammersängerin. After finishing her stage career in 1977, she devoted herself especially to the training of young singers.

== Death ==
Ziese died in Meiningen, aged 87.

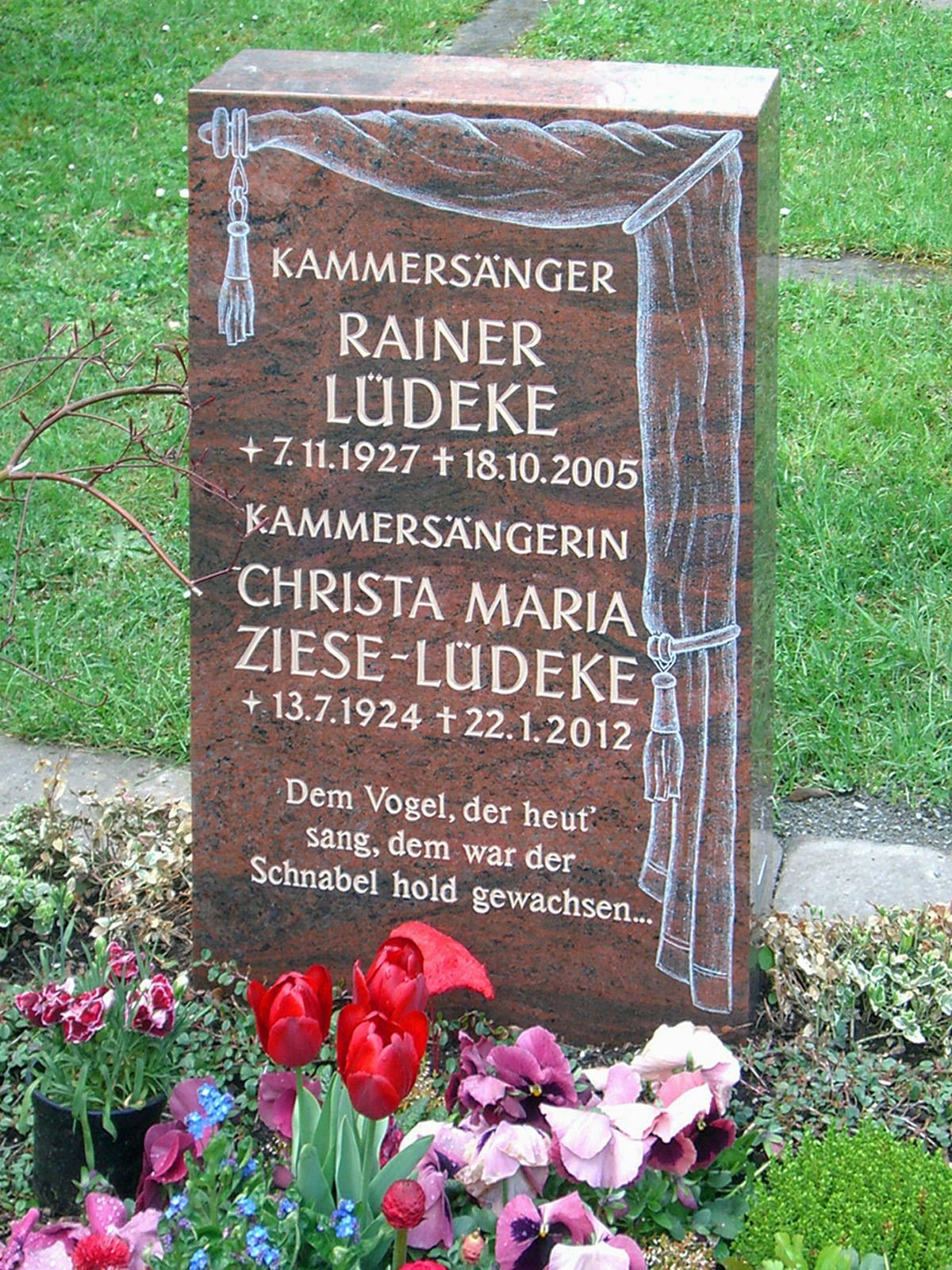
Her grave at the Südfriedhof Leipzig

She spent the rest of her life in Meiningen. She was buried alongside her husband, Rainer Lüdeke, on the Leipzig Südfriedhof.

== Awards ==
- On 6 October 1963, she was awarded the Nationalpreis der DDR III. class for art and literature.
