= Martin Stadtfeld =

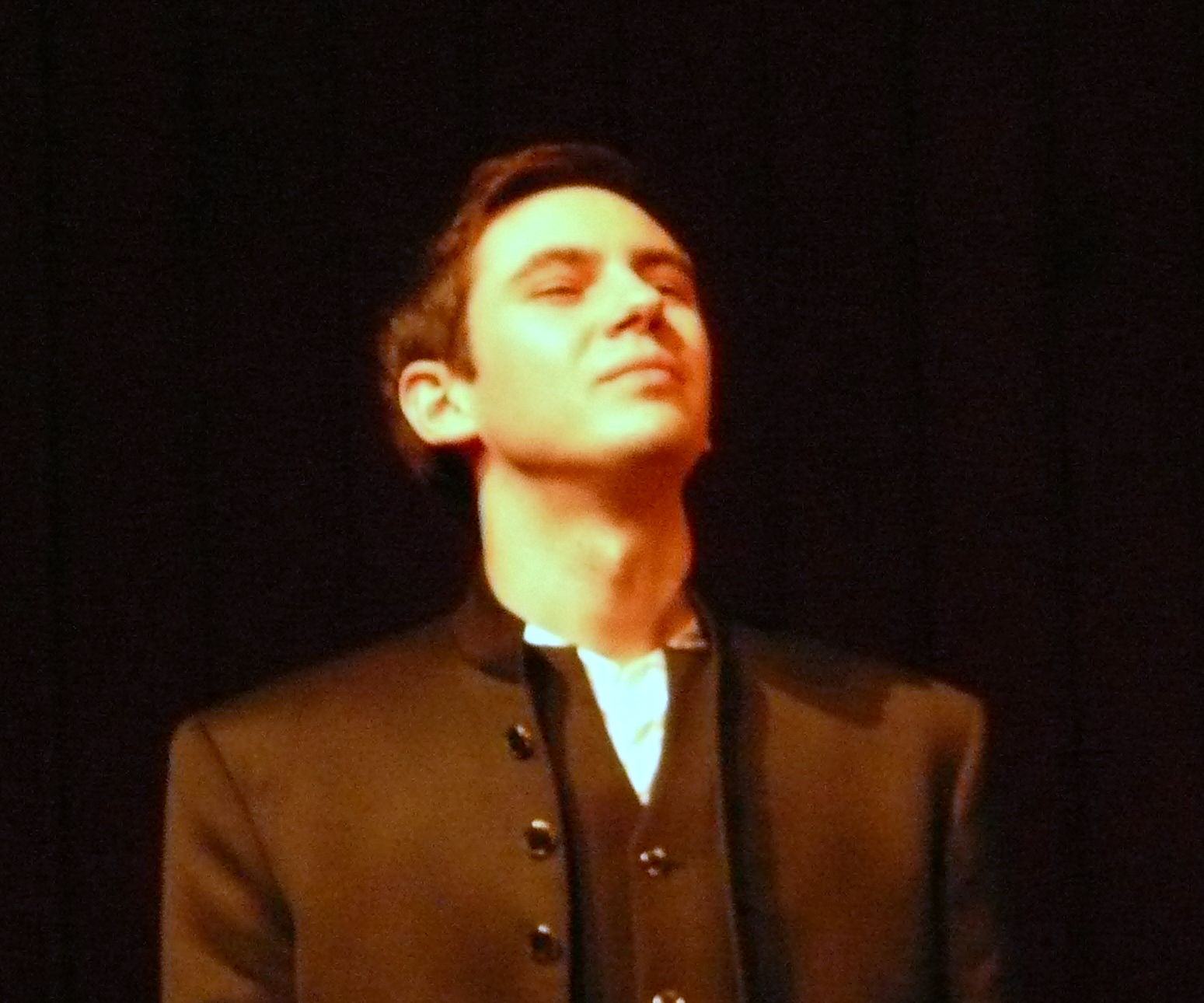
- Martin Stadtfeld

Background information
- Born: (Stadtfeld, Martin); 1980 (age 44–45)
- Origin: Koblenz, Germany
- Occupation: Pianist
- Instrument: Piano

Martin Stadtfeld (born 19 November 1980) is a German pianist.

Stadtfeld gave his first concert at age 9, and at age 14 enrolled at the Frankfurt University of Music and Performing Arts in Frankfurt under the tutelage of Russian-American professor Lev Natochenny. He completed his Abitur in 2000 at Landesmusikgymnasium Rhineland-Palatinate.

Stadtfeld is currently under contract with Sony Classical.

== Awards ==
- 2002: First prize at the 11th International Bach Competition of Leipzig
