= St. Severin, Keitum =

St. Severin
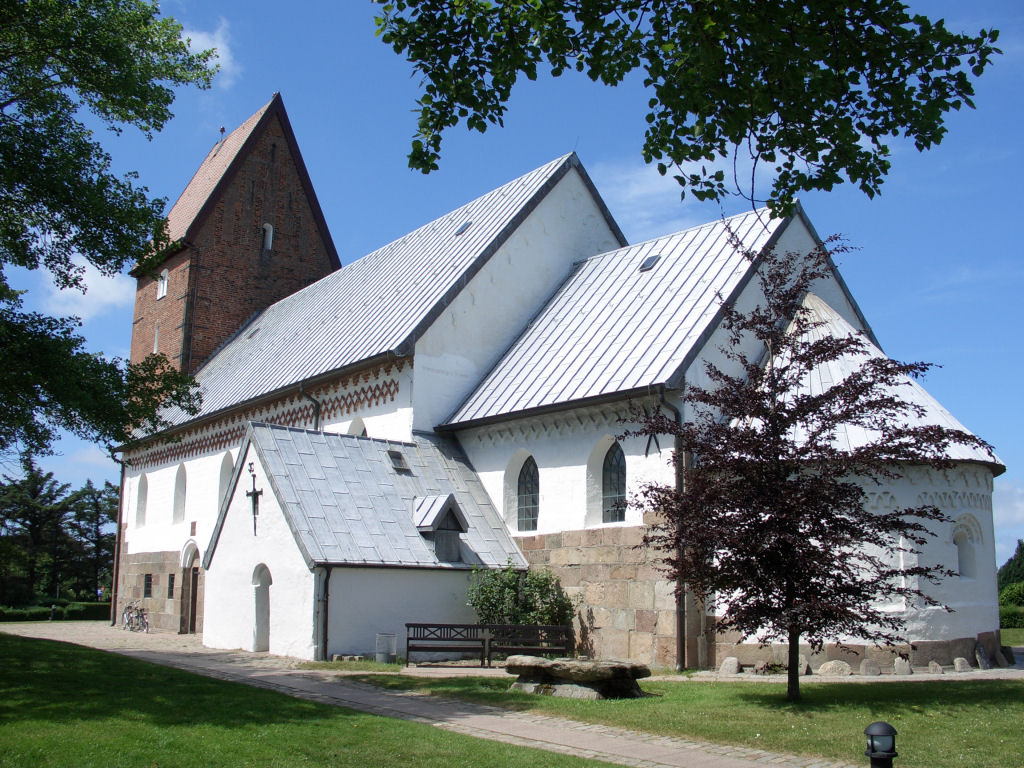

- 54°54′7″N 8°21′50″E
- Location: Keitum
- Country: Germany
- Denomination: Lutheran
- Website: www.st-severin.de

Architecture
- Style: Romanesque, Gothic (tower)
- Years built: early 13th century

St. Severin is a Lutheran parish church in Keitum on the island of Sylt, northern Germany. It was named after the 4th-century bishop Severin of Cologne. Built in the Romanesque style and first documented in 1240, the church stands back from the town at a higher elevation. Tests have shown that the roof of the church can be dated to 1216, making it the oldest religious building in Schleswig-Holstein. The tower was built around 1450 and served as a navigation mark for seafarers as well as a prison.

== History ==
The site upon which the church now stands initially housed a sanctuary to Odin and was used for the worship of Germanic gods. According to legend, the Danish king Canute the Great (995–1035) provided money and stones for a church to be built in Keitum. The first documented reference to the church dates from 1240. It was probably initially dedicated to St Canute. Tests recently carried out by Hamburg University's Institut für Holzbiologie (Wood Biology Institute) indicate that the building's roof rafters are from 1216, making the church the oldest in Schleswig-Holstein. The wood used in other parts of the church appears to have the same origin, indicating that not only the nave but also the chancel and the apse can also be dated to 1216. The tower, however, is more recent, from the mid-15th century.¨

As a result of the plague in 1350 and the Grote Mandrenke storm in 1362, the island was depopulated and the church abandoned. Missionaries from the Archdiocese of Cologne restored the islanders' faith, dedicating the church to St. Severin in memory of the 4th-century bishop of Cologne. In 1544, the church became Lutheran.

== Architecture ==
The nave, recessed chancel and the semicircular apse are built of naturally coloured granite blocks, white-plastered tuff and brick. Evidence of the Romanesque style can be seen in the apse's east window. Cross-arched and stepped friezes decorate the exterior of the apse while zigzag and lozenge designs top the nave and chancel walls. While the windows on the north side of the chancel exhibit only minor adaptations to the Gothic style, the five on either side of the nave are clearly pointed. The almost square-shaped tower is the only Gothic brick structure on the island. It served not only as a bell tower but as a refuge and until 1806 as a prison. Visible from afar, it was used by seafarers as a landmark. Following an accident in 1740, access to the tower room was bricked up but it was reopened in 1981 as an extension to the nave. As the former 15th-century south porch is now used as a vestry, the main entrance to the church is now on the north side.

== Furnishings and fittings ==
The interior of the church was refurbished in 1985 - the wooden panels, pews and fittings were restored to their original light green colour. Remains of a fresco of the Last Judgment on the north matroneum were revealed. The choir is separated from the nave by a chancel arch while a second arch leads into the half-dome of the apse.

Dating from 1230, the oldest piece in the church is the Bentheim sandstone baptismal font which stands on a base with four lions at the corners. The Late Gothic altarpiece from about 1480 is probably the work of the Lübeck imperialissima master carver. It depicts God the Father with the Risen Christ flanked by Mary with the infant Jesus and Bishop Severin. The wings of the triptych display the figures of the Apostles. The predella presents a local painting of the Last Supper (1705). The scenes of the Passion on the back of the altarpiece are badly damaged. The early Renaissance pulpit (1580) comes from Møgeltønder in Denmark. The panels present coats of arms and the Christian virtues: faith, temperance and justice.

The church has a new organ (1999) built by Mühleisen of Leonberg. With its 46 registers, it is the largest in Nordfriesland. Matthias Eisenberg was the organist from 1992 to 2004.

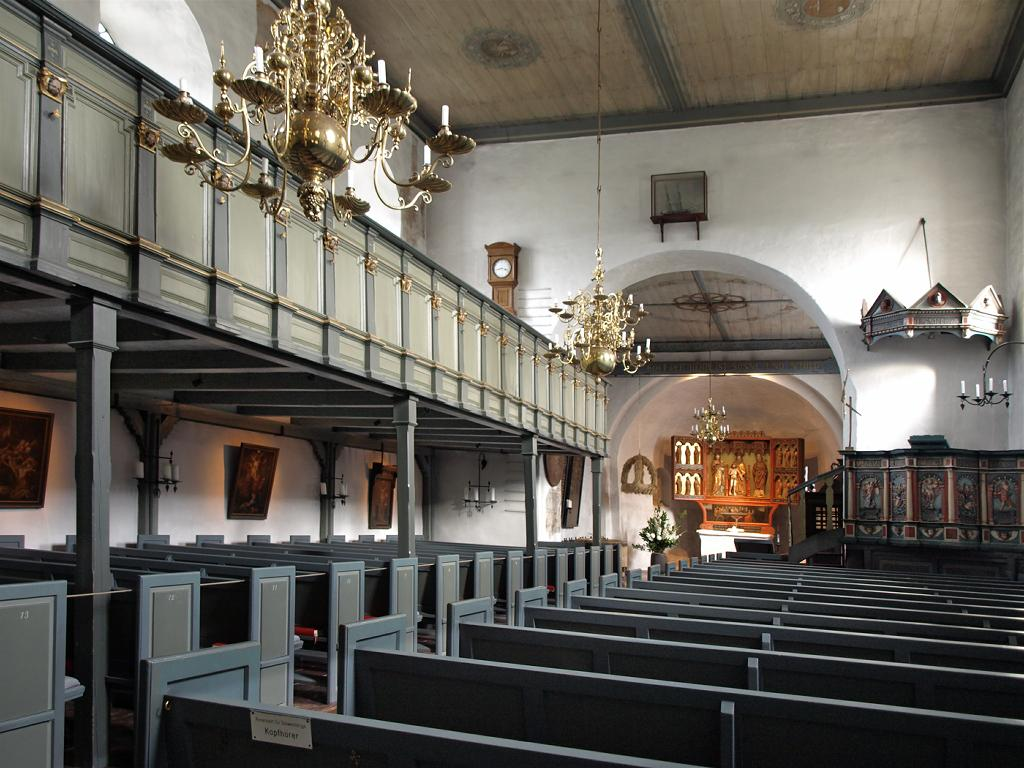
Interior

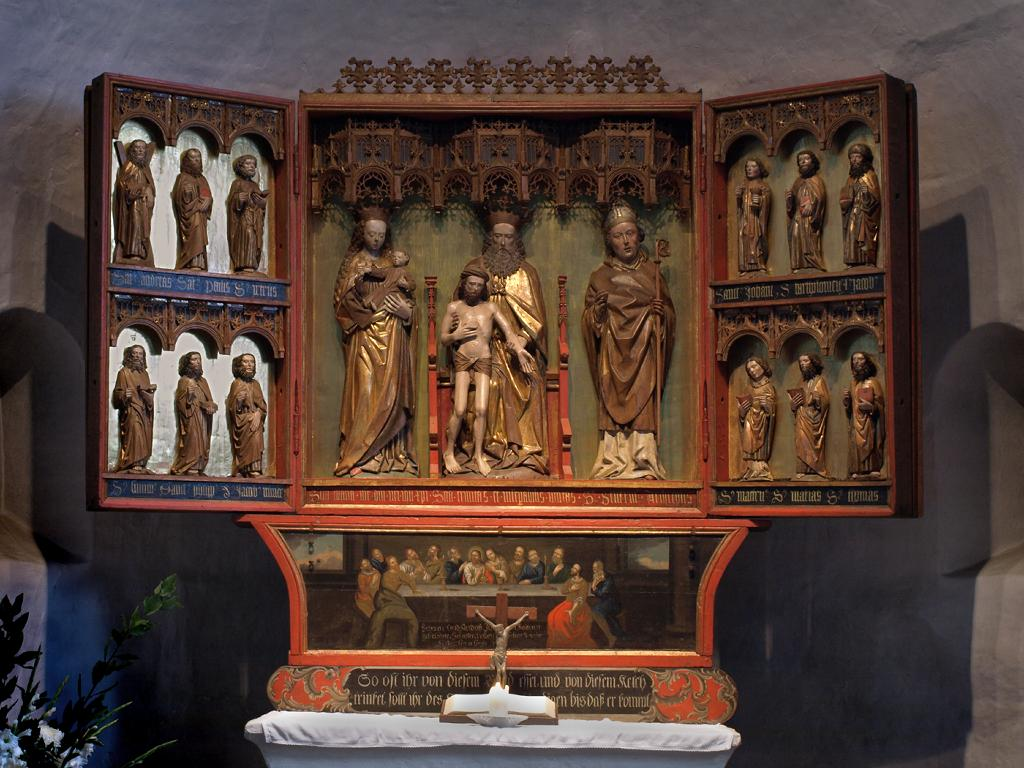
Altarpiece (c. 1480)

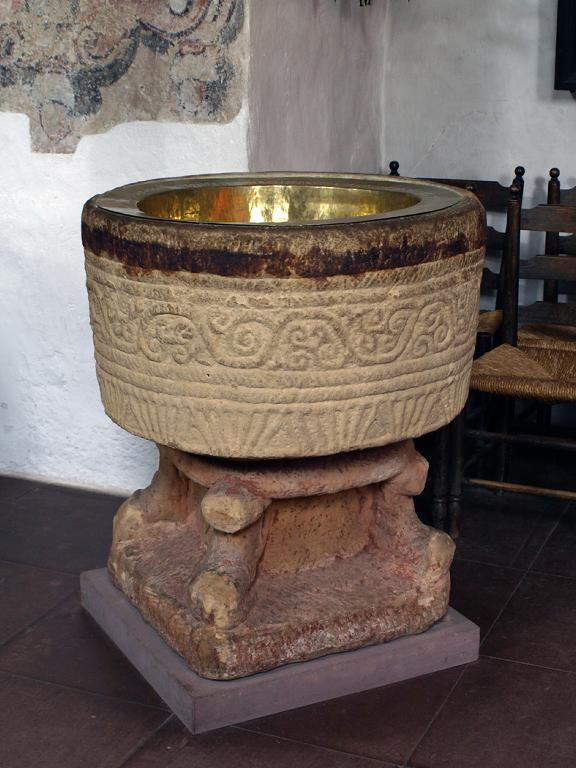
Font (1230)

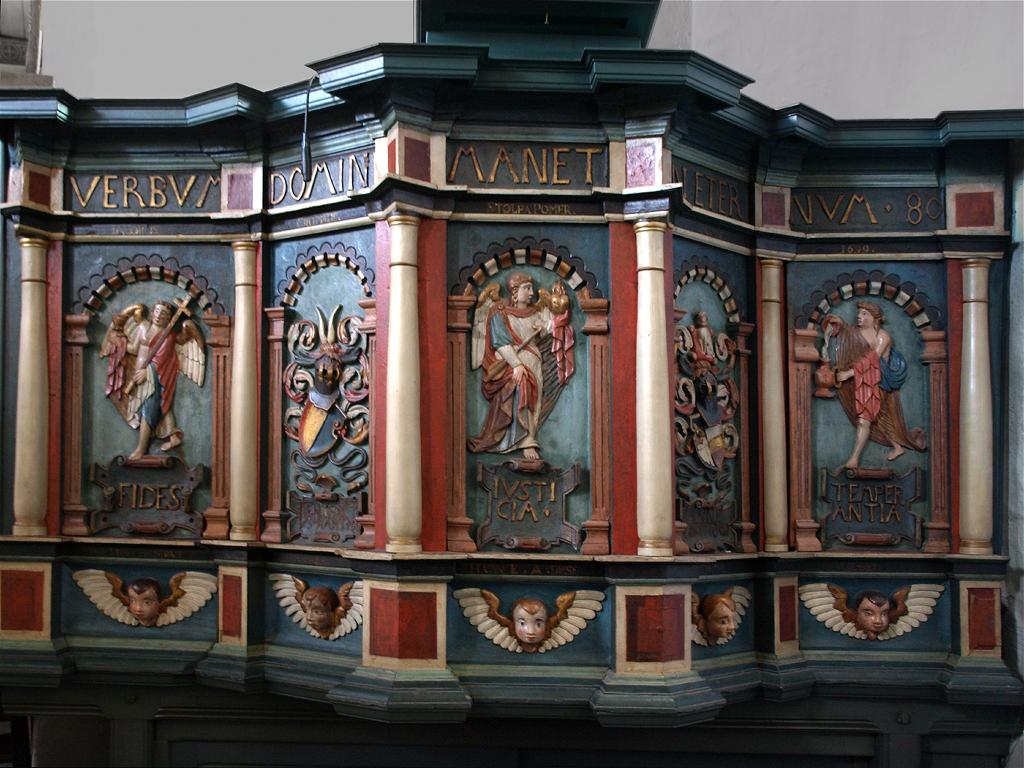
Pulpit (1580)
