= Alexei Gorokhov =

Soviet violinist (1927–1999), Soviet violinist

Aleksey Gorokhov
- Aleksey Gorokhov in a promotional shot, circa. 1950

Background information
- Born: February 11, 1927
- Origin: Moscow, Russia
- Died: February 3, 1999 (aged 71)
- Genres: Classical
- Occupations: Violinist, Conductor, Professor
- Instrument: Violin

Aleksey Nikolaevich Gorokhov (Russian: Алексей Николаевич Горохов; Ukrainian: Олексій Миколайович Горохов; February 11, 1927, Moscow – February 3, 1999) was a Soviet violinist who lived most of his professional life in the Ukrainian Soviet Socialist Republic. He is considered a founder of the modern Kiev violin school.

== Biography ==
Between 1934 and 1944 Gorokhov studied at the Moscow Central Music School for Gifted Children. Later he entered Moscow Conservatory where he studied with Lev Tseitlin, graduating in 1949. In 1955 he finished Post-Graduate study under the instruction of Abram Yampolsky. In addition to his violin diploma he received a degree in Musicology.

Between 1949 and 1951 Gorokhov took part in several international violin competitions, among them the Bach Competition in 1950 where he received 2nd prize. At the Queen Elizabeth Competition in 1951 he was awarded 5th Prize. This followed by him touring extensively in the Soviet Union as well as in Germany, Poland, Denmark, Sweden, Romania, Portugal and Korea. In 1957 he became a professor of the violin at the Kiev Conservatory (later renamed Tchaikovsky National Academy of Music) and taught there until the end of his life.

Gorokhov lived a simple, humble life. One of the primary factors in his decision to move to Kiev in 1956 was a disinterest in the politics of his Russian homeland. This may partly explain why, apart from being declared an "Honored Artist Worker of Ukraine", he wasn't given a formal status in other countries.

== Discography ==
- 2008: Spanish Violin by Aleksey Gorokhov
- 2008: Fritz Kreisler by Aleksey Gorokhov
- 2008: Niccolo Paganini by Aleksey Gorokhov

== Notable works ==
During 50 years of his creative life Gorokhov recorded a great number of disks, being the first violinist in the Soviet Union to record all 6 violin concertos by Niccolo Paganini.

To Ukrainian Radio he left over 70 hours of recorded music, including Bach's Sonatas and Partitas, Paganini's 24 Caprices, 24 preludes by Shostakovich (Gorokhov's own arrangement), Violin Concertos by Beethoven, Tchaikovsky, Mendelssohn, Brahms, and many other.

To mark Gorokhov's 70th Birthday he performed once again the 6 Paganini Concertos within 2 days. The Concertos were presented in an original orchestration by Gorokhov, which most completely embodied the criteria of Paganini's virtuoso-romantic aesthetics in orchestra. This arrangement is intended for a string orchestra with solo instruments besides the solo violin such as: guitar, viola and double bass, making Gorokhov's orchestration unique.

His recordings of the Concertos recorded with the Ukrainian National Opera Theatre Orchestra between 1973 and 1978, were digitally remastered and re-released in 2006.

Gorokhov's 1952 recording of Édouard Lalo's Spanish symphony with the USSR State Symphony Orchestra, conducted by Kyrill Kondrashin is also notable.

== Quotations about Gorokhov ==
Gorokhov's playing received high praise from a number of prominent musicians including Pierre Fournier, Jacques Thibaud, Joseph Szigeti, David Oistrakh and others.

"...The sound reminds one of the best time of Kreisler...the beauty of the 'piano' and 'pianissimo' is extraordinary..." - from Fournier's letter to Gorokhov.

"...Gorokhov's playing cast a spell on me..." - Jacques Thibaut.

"...There were very positive references...[made to] the nobility and tasteful playing of A. Gorokhov" - from 'A conversation with D. Oistrakh' in 'Novoye Vremia' magazine.

"...Listeners were struck...by the noble simplicity and modesty in conjunction with perfect playing skill, which was typical to A. Gorokhov..." - Alexander Svechnikov, 'Sovietskoye Iskustvo' magazine.

"...There are 2 great violin players whose sound is unmistakable and will stay in history - they are Kreisler and Gorokhov." - Abram Shtern.

== Trivia ==
Gorokhov has erroneously been referred to as 'Alexander Gorokhov' on a CD release by Yedang Entertainment, leading some websites and music vendors to list him under the wrong name.
