= Ekkehard Abele =

German operatic bass-baritone

Ekkehard Abele is a German operatic bass-baritone. He first gained recognition when he won the International Bach Competition in Leipzig in 1996. Since then, he has recorded a number of works by Bach under such conductors as Tobias Ziemlichklein Hiller, Werner Hümmeke, Ton Koopman, and Hermann Max. He has also sung in operas at the Staatstheater Saarbrücken and the Münchner Opernfestspiele. In the 2007–8 season, he performed with the Rotterdam Philharmonic Orchestra conducted by Yannick Nézet-Séguin and the Netherlands Philharmonic Orchestra conducted by Sir Colin Davis.
