= Francesco Corti =

Italian harpsichordist and conductor

- Francesco Corti in 2026

Background information
- Born: 1984 (age 41–42); Arezzo, Italy
- Genre: Baroque music
- Occupations: Harpsichordist; conductor
- Instruments: Harpsichord; organ
- Years active: 2007–present

Francesco Corti (born 1984) is an Italian harpsichordist and conductor specializing in Baroque music.

He won first prize in harpsichord at the International Johann Sebastian Bach Competition in Leipzig in 2006 and was a prizewinner at the Bruges Harpsichord Competition in 2007. Since 2023 he has been the musical director of the Drottningholm Palace Theatre (Drottningholms Slottsteater) in Sweden.

== Early life and training ==
Corti was born in Arezzo, Tuscany, into a family of musicians. He studied organ and harpsichord in Perugia, then continued in Geneva and Amsterdam, where his teachers included the Dutch harpsichordist Bob van Asperen, himself a student of Gustav Leonhardt.

== Career ==
As a soloist, Corti has given recitals and concerts across Europe, North and South America, Asia and New Zealand. He has appeared at festivals such as the Salzburg Festival, the Bachfest Leipzig, the Musikfest Bremen and the Festival Oude Muziek in Utrecht, and in venues including the Salle Pleyel and Théâtre des Champs-Élysées in Paris, the Bozar in Brussels, the Berlin Philharmonie and the Concertgebouw in Amsterdam.

Since 2007 he has been a member of Les Musiciens du Louvre under Marc Minkowski, and he has collaborated with early-music ensembles including Zefiro (Alfredo Bernardini), Harmonie Universelle (Florian Deuter), Les Talens Lyriques (Christophe Rousset), Le Concert des Nations (Jordi Savall) and Bach Collegium Japan (Masaaki Suzuki). He has been principal guest conductor of Il Pomo d'Oro since 2018 and has also conducted the Freiburger Barockorchester, The English Concert, Kammerorchester Basel and the Akademie für Alte Musik Berlin.

Corti directed The English Concert at BachFest festival in Bath.

Since 2023 he has led the summer opera productions at the Drottningholm Palace Theatre, conducting Purcell's The Fairy-Queen (2023), Lully's Armide (2024) and Telemann's Orpheus (2025).

== Teaching ==
Corti has given masterclasses in Europe, Latin America and Asia. Since 2016 he has been professor of harpsichord and basso continuo at the Schola Cantorum Basiliensis in Basel.

== Recordings and awards ==
Corti's solo discography includes the harpsichord suites of Louis Couperin (2007), the six Partitas of Johann Sebastian Bach, sonatas by Haydn, and Mozart chamber works. His album Bach: Little Books (Arcana) received a Diapason d'Or and a Gramophone Editor's Choice. His recordings have also been recognized with the Preis der Deutschen Schallplattenkritik and a Choc de Classica.

His conducting discography includes collaborations with American tenor Michael Spyres and Polish counter-tenor Jakub Josef Orlinski, the latter earning them a prize at the International Classical Music Awards in 2022.
