= Christoph Genz =

German tenor in opera and concert

- Born: 1 March 1971 (age 54); Erfurt, East Germany
- Education: Thomanerchor; King's College, Cambridge; Musikhochschule Leipzig
- Occupation: Classical tenor
- Organization(s): Theater Basel, Staatsoper Hamburg
- Awards: International Johann Sebastian Bach Competition

Christoph Genz (born 1 March 1971 in Erfurt) is a German tenor in opera and concert.

== Career ==
Christoph Genz was a member of the Thomanerchor. He studied music at King's College, Cambridge, where he was a member of the King's College Choir. He studied voice with Hans-Joachim Beyer at the Hochschule für Musik und Theater "Felix Mendelssohn Bartholdy" Leipzig and with Elisabeth Schwarzkopf. In 1996, he won first prize at the International Johann Sebastian Bach Competition.

In 1997, he became a member of the Theater Basel. He appeared as a guest at theatres such as the Teatro alla Scala, Milan, the Semperoper, Dresden, Théâtre des Champs-Élysées, Paris, and opera houses including Lausanne, Cologne, Nancy, Leipzig, Wiesbaden, and La Coruna. In 2000, Genz sang for the first time at the Hamburg State Opera. From 2001 to 2004 he was a member, singing parts such as Tamino in Mozart's Die Zauberflöte, Belmonte in Die Entführung aus dem Serail, 'Ferrando' in Cosi fan tutte, 'Don Ottavio' in Don Giovanni, Chevalier in Poulenc's Dialogues des Carmélites and many more.

Genz has appeared under leading conductors such as Herbert Blomstedt, Giuseppe Sinopoli, Riccardo Chailly, Kurt Masur, Sir Simon Rattle, Nicolaus Harnoncourt, Sir John Eliot Gardiner, Sir Roger Norrington, Ton Koopman, Ingo Metzmacher, Kent Nagano, Ivor Bolton, Markus Stenz, Daniel Harding, Helmuth Rilling, Michail Jurowski, Masaaki Suzuki and others.

His discography contains more than 60 CDs and DVDs including operas, concerts, songs and arias. He recorded Bach cantatas with Sir John Eliot Gardiner and sang the tenor roles in La Petite Bande's Complete Bach Cantatas conducted by Sigiswald Kuijken and recorded between 2006 and 2011, as well as the St John Passion conducted by Ludwig Güttler, the St Matthew Passion and the Mass in B minor with La Petite Bande conducted by Sigiswald Kuijken. In 2005, he appeared with La Petite Bande in a concert of Bach cantatas at the Rheingau Musik Festival in Eibingen Abbey, together with Siri Thornhill, Petra Noskaiová and Jan van der Crabben. He performed in Mendelssohn's Lobgesang, conducted by Helmuth Rilling. He sang the part of Brighella in a recording of Richard Strauss's Ariadne auf Naxos, with the Staatskapelle Dresden and Giuseppe Sinopoli, and the part of Tamino in a recording with Sigiswald Kuijken. He performed the Mass in B minor also with the Gewandhausorchester Leipzig, conducted by both Herbert Blomstedt and Georg Christoph Biller.

From 2017 to 2022 Genz was working as Head of the Arts Department, Music teacher and Dean of Faculty at UWC Changshu in China, which is part of the group of United World Colleges. He is currently Director of Performing Arts at United World College of the Adriatic in Duino, Italy, where he teaches Music and organises a concert series, regular masterclasses and peripatetic music lessons for the students. In July 2024 he was invited to be a member of the Jury for the International Johann Sebastian Bach Competition in Leipzig.
