= Waldemar Maciszewski =

Polish pianist and composer

Waldemar Maciszewski (1927–1956) was a Polish pianist and composer.

Macizewski was born in Warsaw in 1927. He trained under Zbigniew Drzewiecki at the underground Warsaw Conservatory throughout World War II and at the Cracow State Music Academy from 1945 to 1948. He ranked 6th at the 1948 Béla Bartók Competition, and was awarded the just reinstated 1949 IV International Chopin Piano Competition's 3rd prize. One year later he shared 3rd prize with Jörg Demus at the inaugural edition of the Johann Sebastian Bach Competition in Leipzig.

In addition to his concert career, he was active as a jazz musician and performed popular music. As a composer he composed two Concertinos for piano and orchestra, a band Suite, a choral Suite on Wielkopolska's folklore, songs and incidental music both for theatre plays and the radio.

He died at 29, run over by a train.
