= Margarita Fyodorova =

Russian pianist

Margarita Alekseevna Fyodorova
- Born: 4 November 1927; Moscow, Russia
- Origin: Russia
- Died: 14 August 2016 (aged 88); Moscow, Russia
- Genres: Classical music
- Occupation: Pianist
- Instrument: Piano

Margarita Alekseevna Fyodorova - Маргарита Алексеевна Фёдорова (4 November 1927 - 14 August 2016) was a Soviet Russian pianist, People's Artist of Russia. She won silver in the International Johann Sebastian Bach Competition in 1950. She was known for her interpretations of Alexander Scriabin's work.

== Life and career ==
Margarita Fyodorova studied piano at and graduated from the Moscow Conservatory. She studied under Heinrich Neuhaus. In 1950, she participated in the first International Johann Sebastian Bach Competition, which she won silver for with her performance of the Goldberg Variations. In 1957, Fyodorova debuted Dmitri Shostakovich's Second Piano Concerto, which the composer asked her to perform.

She specialized in interpretations of Alexander Scriabin's work. In the 1970s she recorded Ludwig van Beethoven's Diabelli Variations. She also performed works by Johann Sebastian Bach, Franz Schubert and Frédéric Chopin.

Fyodorova served as Professor of Piano at the Moscow Conservatory. She taught John Bell Young, Saya Sayantsetseg and Dmitry Lyudkov.
