= Irina Zahharenkova =

Estonian pianist

Irina Zahharenkova (born 23 February 1976 in Kaliningrad) is an Estonian pianist and harpsichordist trained at the Estonian Academy of Music and the Sibelius Academy.

Competition record
2003	(Lithuania) Mikolajus K. Ciurlionis IPC	2nd Prize
2004	(Spain) Premio Jaén IPC	1st Prize
2005	(France) Épinal IPC	2nd Prize
2005	(Czech Republic) Prague Spring IMC	2nd Prize
2005	(Romania) George Enescu IPC	1st Prize
2005	(Switzerland) Geneva IMC	3rd Prize
2006	(Italy) Alessandro Casagrande IPC	1st Prize
2006	(Germany) Johann Sebastian Bach IPC	1st Prize
2006	(Brazil) Heitor Villa-Lobos IPC	4th Prize
