= Valery Afanassiev =

Russian-born Belgian pianist, writer, and conductor

Valery Pavlovich Afanassiev
- Валерий Павлович Афанасьев
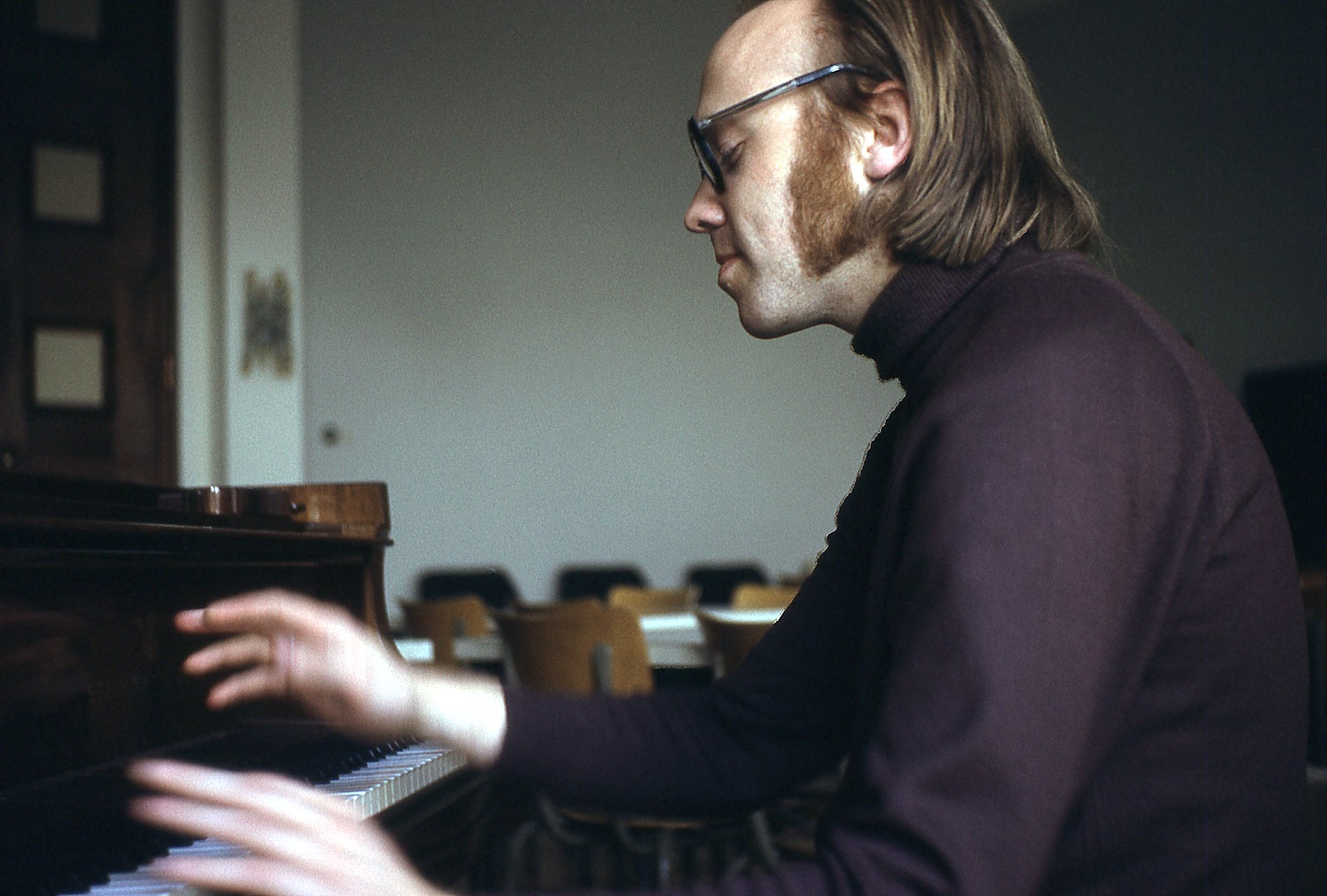
- Valery Afanassiev in 1974
- Born: September 8, 1947 (age 78); Moscow
- Education: Academic Music College, Moscow Conservatory
- Occupations: Pianist, writer, conductor

Valery Pavlovich Afanassiev (Russian: Валерий Павлович Афанасьев, romanized: Valery Pavlovich Afanasyev; born 8 September 1947) is a Russian pianist, writer and conductor.

== Life ==
Valery Afanassiev was born in Moscow. He studied piano at the Academic Music College and Moscow Conservatory with Emil Gilels and Yakov Zak. He was the winner of the Bach Competition in Leipzig in 1968, as well as 1st prize recipient at the Concours Reine Elisabeth in Brussels in 1971. Shortly after, while touring around Belgium, he decided to seek political asylum, and was eventually granted Belgian citizenship.

Afanassiev lives in Versailles.

== Work and critical reception ==
Afanassiev become widely known in the 1980s due to his musical partnership with Gidon Kremer. Their joint recordings of chamber works by Mozart, Schubert, and Brahms were highly praised. His interpretations of solo piano works by Franz Schubert, Ludwig van Beethoven and the others have aroused controversy on account of Afanassiev's tempi choices and idiosyncratic expressiveness. One review of his recording of Schubert's last three piano sonatas stated: "the perversity encountered here so angered me that I felt I could not dignify what I found here with any kind of coherent analysis".

Afanassiev is also a writer of poetry, novels, and drama. He is also an orchestral conductor.
