= International Johann Sebastian Bach Competition =

Music competition in Leipzig, Germany

The International Johann Sebastian Bach Competition (German: Internationaler Bach Wettbewerb Leipzig) is a music competition in Leipzig, Germany, held by the Bach-Archiv Leipzig. It was founded in 1950 and was held every four years from 1964 to 1996 with five subjects and is now held every two years with three changing subjects violin / baroque violin, piano, harpsichord or in the fields of voice, cello / baroque violoncello and organ. From 1965 the competition is a member of the World Federation of International Music Competitions in Geneva.

== Prizes ==
Prizes for participants:

Prize	Amount
1st prize	€10,000
2nd prize	€7,500
3rd prize	€5,000

The Prize winners have the right to use the title "Bach Prize Winners".

== Prizewinners ==
Prize winners have included:

- Harpsichordists: Pieter-Jan Belder (2000), Francesco Corti (2006), Andrew Rosenblum (2018)
- Pianists: Tatiana Nikolayeva, Margarita Fyodorova, Jörg Demus, Waldemar Maciszewski (1950), Igor Lazko (1964), Valery Afanassiev, Svetlana Navasardyan, Ivan Klansky (1968), Kei Itoh (1980), Alexander Paley (1984), Nikolai Luganski (1988), Ragna Schirmer (1992 & 1998), Cornelia Herrmann, Christopher Hinterhuber (1996), Miku Nishimoto-Neubert (1998), Martin Stadtfeld (2002), Irina Zahharenkova (2006), Ilya Poletaev (2010), Hilda Huang (2014), Paul Posnak
- Organists: Amadeus Webersinke, Karl Richter, Diethard Hellmann (1950), Daniel Chorzempa (1968), Hans Fagius (1972), Matthias Eisenberg (1976), Jaroslav Tůma (1980), John Scott (1984), Balint Karosi (2008)
- Violinists: Alexei Gorokhov (1950), Oleg Kagan (1968), Hiroko Suzuki, Johannes Ludwig Von Schwartz (1984), Marat Bisengaliev (1988), Rachel Barton (1992), Shunsuke Sato (2010)
- Cellists: Alexander Rudin (1976), Michael Sanderling (1988), Richard Harwood (2004)
- Flutists: Matthias Rust, Alison Mitchell (1984)
- Singers: Bruce Abel (1964), Gábor Németh (1976), Jadwiga Rappé (1980), Bogna Bartosz (1992), Simone Kermes, Christoph Genz, Ekkehard Abele (1996), Jan Kobow (1998), Franziska Gottwald (2002), Dominik Wörner (2002), Markus Flaig (2004), Hongyi Cai (2022)

== Jury ==
President: Robert D. Levin (since 2002)

Members of jury have included:

- Pianists: Dmitri Shostakovich (1950), Jan Ekier (1964), Paul Badura-Skoda (2006), Bruno Canino (2006), Malcolm Bilson (chairmaster of pianists – 2010), João Carlos Martins (2010), Bernard Ringeissen (2010), Tamás Vásáry (2010), Fanny Waterman (2010)
- Harpsichordists: Magdalena Myczka (2000, 2010), Bob van Asperen (2006), Lars Ulrik Mortensen (2006), Masaaki Suzuki (2006), Richard Egarr (2010), Robert Hill (chairmaster of harpsichordists – 2010), Andrea Marcon (2010), Andreas Staier (2018)
- Organists: Bronisław Rutkowski (1964, died during the competition), Hans Fagius (2012), Ton Koopman (chairmaster – 2012)
- Christopher Hogwood has served as a juror in the vocal category in 2012
- Violinists: Reinhard Goebel (2018)
