= Bálint Karosi =

Hungarian organist and composer

Bálint Karosi (born 1979 in Budapest, Hungary) is a Hungarian organist and composer.

Karosi is a concert organist, composer and advocate of the art of keyboard improvisation in historic styles. He has appeared as a soloist at the Gewandhaus in Leipzig, the Béla Bartók National concert Hall in Budapest, the Rudolfinum in Prague, the Liszt Academy in Budapest, the Victoria Hall in Geneva and the Essen Philarmonie, and has been a soloist at the Baldwin Wallace Bach Festival, the International Bach Festival in Leipzig, the Boston Early Music Festival and the Magadino Organ Festival in Switzerland. He has performed in historic venues such as the Thomaskirche in Leipzig, the Marienkirche in Lübeck, the Cathedrals in Speyer, Geneva, Freiberg, St. Albans and at Christ Church in Dublin. He has released three CDs by Hungaroton, Dorian and Dulcian labels.

Mr. Karosi captured media attention when he became the first American-based organist to win the International Bach Competition in Leipzig, Germany. He also won first prize and audience prize at the Dublin International Organ Competition, the Miami International Competition, the Arthur Poister Organ Competition in Syracuse, and second prize at the American Guild of Organist's National Young Artist Competition and the St. Maurice d’Agaune Competition in Switzerland.

Balint Karosi's compositions include chamber music, cantatas, art songs, works for the organ and sacred and orchestral music. He was commissioned recently by the Boston Modern Orchestra Project for Existentia in memoriam Sándor Weöres, for symphony orchestra, to be premiered January, 2015. His Triple Concerto for Harp, Guitar and Cimbalom is scheduled for a performance in April, 2015 in Budapest by Musicians Libres. The Hungarian State Opera has commissioned an overture for orchestra to be premiered in 2016. His Concerto for Organ and Symphony Orchestra, commissioned by the National Concert Hall in Budapest was premiered in 2007 by the Miskolc Symphony Orchestra with the composer as soloist. The performance was subsequently broadcast on NPR's Pipedreams. His Orpheus’ Harp, a solo cantata for tenor, harp, organ, violin and percussion, based on a poem by Czeszław Miłosz was premiered at the National Concert Hall in Budapest in 2010 by the acclaimed Hungarian tenor, Szabolcs Brickner, violinist Kristóf Baráti with László Fassang as organist.

In 2013-2014 He has collaborated with poet Kai Hoffmann-Krull in two cantatas for choir, orchestra and soloists: Lines of a Page, commissioned by the Norfolk Chamber Music Festival, and Words of Beginning, written for the 175th anniversary of the First Lutheran Church of Boston. He is currently collaborating with the acclaimed stage director and librettist András Almási-Tóth to write an opera based on a Hungarian folk tale. His song cycle Poems of the Night, and his Dancescapes for symphony orchestra has earned him the Charles Ives Scholarship from the American Academy of Arts and Letters. He is also the recipient of the Hungarian Junior Prima Prize.

A devoted teacher of organ, improvisation and music theory, Mr. Karosi has taught at Boston University and UMass Boston, the Oberlin Conservatory and the Yale Department of Music. He has been an advocate of the art of keyboard improvisation since he started playing the organ at age seventeen. His doctoral thesis Rhetoric and Schemata: Improvising the Chorale Prelude in the 18th-century Lutheran Tradition investigates the pedagogical, cultural and methodological role of the Lutheran Chorales in teaching improvisation in the eighteenth century.

Karosi has completed doctoral studies at the Yale School of Music and his D.M.A. was awarded in 2017. He earned master's degrees from the Yale School of Music, the Oberlin Conservatory, the Liszt Academy in Budapest, and a Prix de Virtuosité from the Conservatoire Supérieur de Genève. He is under management with Penny Lorenz Artist Management.

== List of Works ==
=== Concerti ===
- Syöjätär for Organ with quarter tone division and Chamber Orchestra
- Double Concerto for Guitar, Cimbalom and String Orchestra
- Concerto for B-flat Clarinet and String Orchestra
- Concerto after Vivaldi for Harpsichord and String Quintet
- Harpsichord Concerto for Harpsichord and String Quintet
- Organ Concertino No. 3 for Organ and Baroque Ensemble
- Concerto No. 2 for Organ, Solo Percussion and Strings
- Triple Concerto for Cimbalom, Guitar, Harp and Chamber Orchestra
- Concerto No. 1 for Organ and Symphony Orchestra
