= Alexander Rudin =

Russian classical cellist and conductor (born 1960)

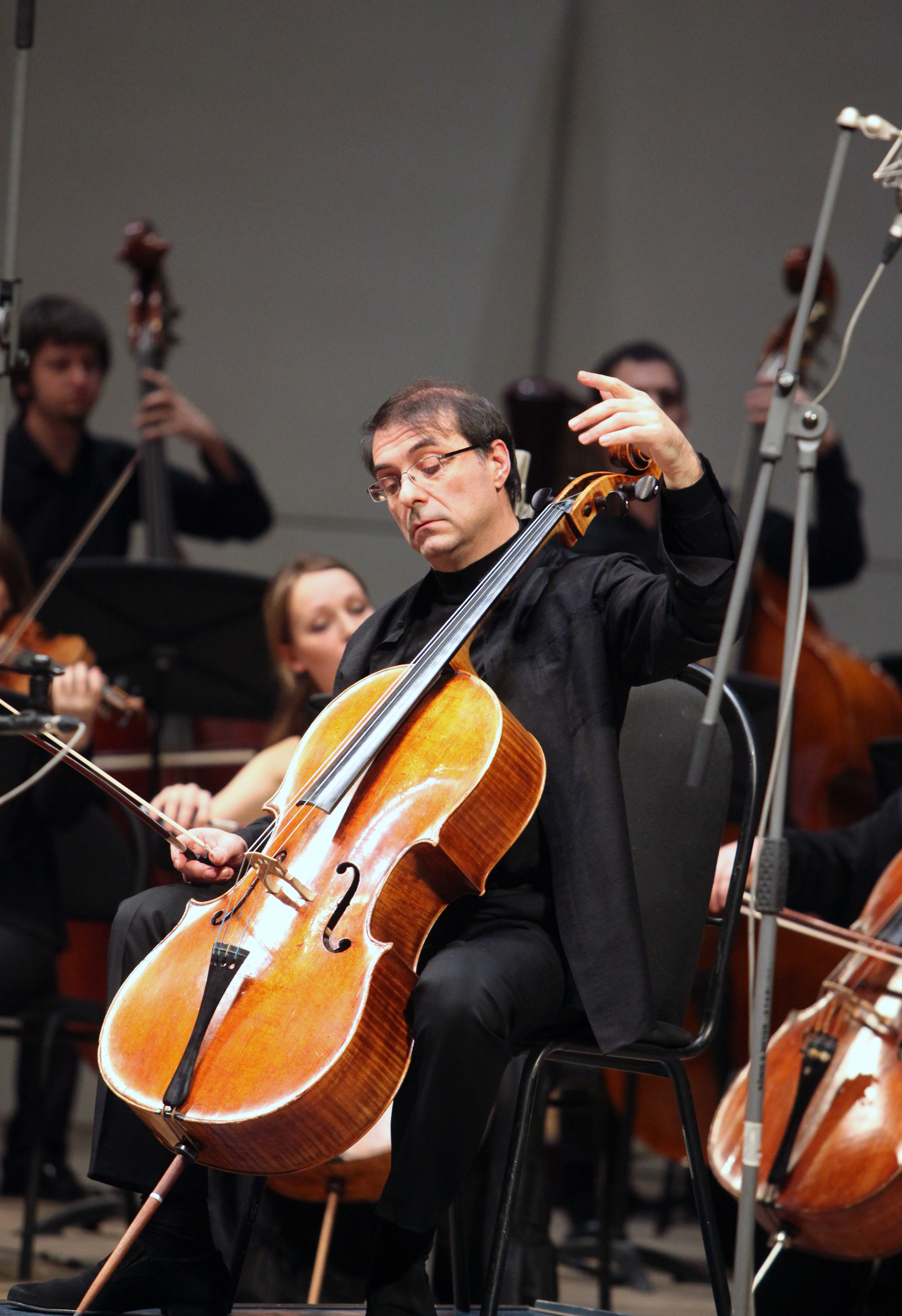
- Rudin in 2010

Background information
- Born: 25 November 1960 (age 65); Moscow, Soviet Union
- Occupation: Musician
- Instrument: Cello

Alexander Israilevich Rudin (Russian: Александр Израилевич Рудин; born 25 November 1960) is a Russian classical cellist and conductor.

== Biography and career ==
Rudin was born in 1960, in Moscow, and he studied piano and cello at the Gnessin Institute before later studying conducting at the Moscow Conservatory with Dmitri Kitayenko. He has won prizes in many international competitions, and has performed as a solo cellist with such orchestras as the Royal Philharmonic, the Vienna Symphony and the Danish Radio Orchestra. His interest in authentic performance practice has led him to play early music and baroque music on both the cello and viola da gamba, in an "historically correct" manner.

As conductor, Rudin works with student orchestras, and has been the director of the Musica Viva Chamber Orchestra since 1988. He is a professor at the Moscow Conservatory, where he teaches chamber music, and gives master classes all around the world. He also teaches at Yaşar University, İzmir, Turkey where he is entitled as the music director.

Rudin has recorded many CDs for the Hyperion, Fuga Libera and Naxos record labels, including works by Bach, Grieg, Prokofiev, Strauss, and others.

== Awards ==
- Order of Friendship (2020)
- People's Artist of Russia (2001)
- Medal "For Labour Distinction"
- State Prize of the Russian Federation in the field of literature and art (2003)
