= Kei Itoh =

Japanese pianist

Kei Itoh is a Japanese pianist.

Itoh graduated at the Tōhō Gakuen Daigaku in 1977, finishing her studies at the Salzburg Mozarteum and the Musikhochschule Hannover. She won the 1979 Epinal and 1983 Munich Competitions.

She has been awarded the XIX Annual award of the Japan Chopin Association (1993) and the 1994 Cultural Arts Support Award of the City of Yokohama. An associate professor at the Tokyo University of the Arts, she remains active as a concert pianist.

She performed in Cairo with violinist Tomoko Kato on November 24, 2000, at the Small Hall of the Cairo Opera House.
