= Wolfgang Ritter =

German biologist

Wolfgang Ritter (born October 28, 1948) is a German biologist and melittology specialist in beekeeping and a veterinary pathology expert on the varroa destructor parasites on bees.

Ritter completed his studies of chemistry and biology at the Johann Wolfgang Goethe-Universität and did a doctorate at the Institute for Bees Research in Oberursel near Frankfurt am Main. Since 1980, he has been leading the Bee Research Department at the Institute for Veterinary Hygiene at Freiburg im Breisgau (today part of the CVUA Freiburg). In 1987 Ritter was elected as President of the Scientific Commission of the International Federation of Beekeepers' Associations "Apimondia" - he left this position in 2015. Moreover, since 1991, he has been working as expert and leader of the reference laboratory for bee health of the World Organisation for Animal Health (OIE). Until 2007, Ritter was a visiting lecturer in the field of bee research at the Faculty for Agricultural Science of the University of Kassel. In addition, since 2010, Ritter has been employed as instructor of the DG Sanco organized course for European veterinarians in the frame of "Better Training for safer food in EU countries". In his specialist area of bee health and ecological beekeeping, Ritter has already published more than 600 well-known peer reviewed and popular scientific publications and has been author and editor of several books.

== Publications ==
- Experimenteller Beitrag zur Thermoregulation des Bienenvolks. Dissertation. 1978.
- Bienenkrankheiten. Ulmer, Stuttgart 1994, ISBN 3-8001-7289-5.
- Diagnostik und Bekämpfung der Bienenkrankheiten. Fischer, Jena 1996, ISBN 3-334-61021-7.
- Honey Bee Diseases and Pests: A Practical Guide Food and Agriculture Organization of the United Nations, 2006
- Bienen gesund erhalten Ulmer, Stuttgart 2012, ISBN 978-3800157297
- Bee health and veterinarians World Organisation for Animal Health, Paris 2014, ISBN 978-92-9044-923-2
- Bienen naturgemäß erhalten Ulmer, Stuttgart 2014, ISBN 978-3800139958
- Gute imkerliche Praxis Ulmer, Stuttgart 2016, ISBN 978-3-8001-0375-1
