= 1796 in Germany =

- Decades: 1800s; 1810s
- See also: Other events of 1796; History of Germany • Timeline • Years

Events from the year 1796 in Germany.

== Incumbents ==
=== Holy Roman Empire ===
- Francis II (5 July 1792 – 6 August 1806)

==== Important Electors ====
- Bavaria- Charles I (30 December 1777 – 16 February 1799)
- Saxony- Frederick Augustus I (17 December 1763 – 20 December 1806)

=== Kingdoms ===
- Kingdom of Prussia
  - Monarch – Frederick William II (17 August 1786 – 16 November 1797)

=== Grand Duchies ===
- Grand Duke of Mecklenburg-Schwerin
  - Frederick Francis I– (24 April 1785 – 1 February 1837)
- Grand Duke of Mecklenburg-Strelitz
  - Charles II (2 June 1794 – 6 November 1816)
- Grand Duke of Oldenburg
  - Wilhelm (6 July 1785 – 2 July 1823) Due to mental illness, Wilhelm was duke in name only, with his cousin Peter, Prince-Bishop of Lübeck, acting as regent throughout his entire reign.
  - Peter I (2 July 1823 – 21 May 1829)
- Grand Duke of Saxe-Weimar
  - Karl August (1758–1809) Raised to grand duchy in 1809

=== Principalities ===
- Schaumburg-Lippe
  - George William (13 February 1787 – 1860)
- Schwarzburg-Rudolstadt
  - Louis Frederick II (13 April 1793 – 28 April 1807)
- Schwarzburg-Sondershausen
  - Günther Friedrich Karl I (14 October 1794 – 19 August 1835)
- Principality of Reuss-Greiz
  - Heinrich XI, Prince Reuss of Greiz (12 May 1778 – 28 June 1800)
- Waldeck and Pyrmont
  - Friedrich Karl August (29 August 1763 – 24 September 1812)

=== Duchies ===
- Duke of Anhalt-Dessau
  - Leopold III (16 December 1751 – 9 August 1817)
- Duke of Saxe-Altenburg
  - Duke of Saxe-Hildburghausen (1780–1826) – Frederick
- Duke of Saxe-Coburg-Saalfeld
  - Ernest Frederick, Duke of Saxe-Coburg-Saalfeld (16 September 1764 – 8 September 1800)
- Duke of Saxe-Meiningen
  - Georg I (1782–1803)
- Duke of Schleswig-Holstein-Sonderburg-Beck
  - Frederick Charles Louis (24 February 1775 – 25 March 1816)
- Duke of Württemberg
  - Frederick II Eugene, Duke of Württemberg (20 May 1795 – 23 December 1797)

=== Other ===
- Landgrave of Hesse-Darmstadt
  - Louis I (6 April 1790 – 14 August 1806)

== Events ==
29 March: Carl Friedrich Gauß determines a construction method for the heptadecagon.

Heptadecagon

7 August: Württemberg cedes its property on the left bank of the Rhine, Mömpelgard, to France in the Peace of Paris in exchange for the promise of later compensation.

25 August: In a separate peace between Sigismund von Reitzenstein on behalf of the Margraviate of Baden and France, Baden has to cede its possessions on the left bank of the Rhine to France and make high reparation payments. In addition, the escaped Margrave Karl Friedrich is supposed to renounce his status as imperial prince.

2 September: Under pressure from its citizens, after experiencing French occupation in the War of the First Coalition, the imperial city of Nuremberg concludes a treaty that will place the city under Prussian sovereignty. Confirmation by the Prussian government did not materialize later due to foreign policy considerations and the necessary assumption of the Nuremberg debt burden.

3 September: In the First Coalition War, Archduke Charles of Austria and his army defeat France's troops under the command of Marshal Jean-Baptiste Jourdan in the Battle of Würzburg . The second defeat after the previous Battle of Amberg on 24 August caused Jourdan to resign his command.

Ludwig van Beethoven dedicates his three piano sonatas Piano Sonata No. 1, Piano Sonata No. 2 and Piano Sonata No. 3 to his teacher Joseph Haydn.

Johann Christoph Friedrich GutsMuths publishes the work Gymnastik für die Jugend ( Gymnastics for Youth: Or a practical guide to Delightful and Amusing exercises for the Use of Schools, An Essay Toward the Necessary Improvement of Education Chiefly as It Relates to Body), in which, among other things, rules for the game of baseball can be found for the first time.

== Births ==
=== January ===
1 January

- Moritz Hermann Eduard Meier, German philologist (died 1855)

7 January

- Peter Nead, German Baptist Brethren theologian (died 1877)

8 January

- Carl Friedrich Alexander Hartmann, German metallurgist (died 1863)

21 January

- Princess Marie of Hesse-Kassel, German princess and painter (died 1880)

23 January

- Karl Ernst Claus, Baltic-German chemist, naturalist (died 1864)

29 January

- Peter Joseph Elvenich, German theologian and philosopher (died 1886)

31 January

- Wilhelm Gotthelf Lohrmann, German astronomer (died 1840)

=== February ===
21 February

- Prince George Bernhard of Anhalt-Dessau, German prince (died 1865)

28 February

- Heinrich Carl Breidenstein, German musicologist (died 1876)

29 February – Germanicus Mirault, surgeon (died 1879)

=== March ===
8 March

- Nicolaus von Weis, German bishop (died 1869)
- Karl Friedrich Heinrich Marx, German physician (died 1877)

11 March – Johann Ludwig Casper, German forensic pathologist (died 1864) 13 March

- Peter van Bohlen, German orientalist and indologist (died 1840)

22 March – Heinrich Karl Beyrich, German botanist (died 1834) 23 March

- Julius Friedrich Heinrich Abegg, German criminologist (died 1868)

31 March

- Theodor Brüggemann, German politician, jurist and educationist (died 1866)
- Hermann Hupfeld, German theologian (died 1866)

=== April ===
13 April

- Andreas Gottlieb Hoffmann, German academic (died 1864)

19 April

- Johann Baptist Friedreich, German forensic pathologist and psychiatrist (died 1862)

24 April

- Karl Immermann, German writer (died 1840)

27 April

- Johann F. C. Hessel, German scientist (died 1872)
- Princess Maria Ferdinanda of Saxony, German princess (died 1865)

=== May ===
6 May

- Karl Heinrich Frotscher, German classical philologist (died 1876)
- Johann Adam Möhler, German theologian (died 1838)

7 May

- Karl Heinrich Mertens, German botanist and naturalist (died 1830)

9 May

- Joseph Meyer, German publisher (died 1856)
- August Pauly, German classical scholar (died 1845)

12 May

- Franz Mone, German historian (died 1871)

15 May

- Johann Heinrich Richartz, German merchant (died 1861)

23 May

- Vince Stingl, Hungarian-German porcelain manufacturer (died 1850)

18 June

- Friedrich Diercks, first German emigrant in Texas (died 1848)
- Wilhelm Hemprich, German naturalist and explorer (died 1825)
- Ernst Mayer, German sculptor (died 1844)

28 June

- Paul Camille von Denis, German businessman (died 1872)

2 July

- Michael Thonet, German-Austrian cabinet maker (died 1871)

3 July – Heinrich Moritz Chalybäus, German philosopher (died 1862)

12 July

- Johann Joseph Schmeller, German painter (died 1841)

13 July

- Gustav Seyffarth, German-American Egyptologist (died 1885)

15 July

- Karl Friedrich Vollrath Hoffmann, German author (died 1847)
- Karl Follen, German poet, writer and revolutionary (died 1840)

22 July

- Peter Joseph Lenné, German landscape architect (died 1866)

27 July

- Heinrich Wilhelm Dove, German physicist and meteorologist (died 1879)
- Friedrich Julius Richelot, German mathematician (died 1875)

29 July

- Peter von Hess, German painter (died 1871)

31 July

- Karl Friedrich Neumann, German orientalist (died 1858)

3 August – Carl Friedrich Naumann, German geologist (died 1873)

6 August

- Christian Friedrich Schönbein, German-Swiss chemist (died 1868)

10 August

- Johann Friedrich Naue, German musician (died 1858)
- Ferdinand Kürnberger, German writer (died 1879)

12 August – Maximilian II of Bavaria, King of Bavaria (died 1864)

13 August

- Johann Wilhelm Zinkeisen, German historian (died 1863)

15 August

- Jacob Acontius, German philosopher and theologian (died 1865)

16 August

- Prince Karl of Hesse and by Rhine, German prince (died 1877)

22 August

- Wilhelm von Humboldt, German statesman, philosopher, linguist, and educational reformer (died 1835)

26 August

- Karl Ludwig Hencke, German astronomer (died 1866)

8 September

- Wilhelm Pape, German lexicographer (died 1864)
- Karl von Vogelsang, Austrian-German journalist and politician (died 1890)

10 September – Hermann Kopp, German chemist (died 1872)

13 September – Johann Georg Wagler, German naturalist (died 1832)

14 September – Theodor Kliefoth, German Lutheran theologian (died 1895)

15 September

- Johann Philipp Reis, German inventor and scientist (died 1874)

19 September – Friedrich Wilhelm Rembert von Berg, Baltic German field marshal (died 1874)

22 September

- Wilhelm Henzen, German archaeologist (died 1887)
- Friedrich Wilhelm Otto, German philologist (died 1865)

29 September

- Karl Wilhelm Walch, German theologian (died 1873)
- Johann Christian Reinhart, German painter (died 1847)

1 October

- Karl Friedrich Wunder, German photographer (died 1871)

5 October

- Johann Georg Eccarius, German tailor and trade unionist (died 1889)
- Johann Adam Hesse, German painter (died 1874)

7 October – Karl Krazeisen, German painter (died 1885)

9 October – Emil Otto Grundmann, German-American painter (died 1890)

13 October

- Karl Gutzkow, German writer (died 1878)

14 October – Theodor Kotschy, Austrian-German botanist and explorer (died 1866)

17 October – Wilhelm von Kaulbach, German painter (died 1874)

18 October

- Johann Wilhelm Hittorf, German physicist (died 1914)

20 October – Moritz von Schwind, German painter (died 1871)

=== October ===
4 October

- August Wilhelm Bach, German composer (died 1869)

10 October

- Franz Gerhard Eschweiler, German botanist (died 1831)

11 October

- August Ahlborn, German painter (died 1857)

16 October

- Karl Spindler, German writer (died 1855)

19 October

- Carl Wagner, German painter known for romantic landscape painting (died 1867)

24 October

- August von Platen-Hallermünde, German poet (died 1835)

26 October

- Gottfried Osann, German chemist and physicist (died 1866)

28 October

- Charles Egon II, Prince of Fürstenberg, German politician (died 1854)

31 October

- Ottilie von Goethe, German writer, editor (died 1872)

=== November ===
3 November

- Friedrich Lennig, German writer (died 1838)

13 November

- Moritz Wilhelm August Breidenbach, German jurist (died 1857)

14 November

- Friederike Funk, German soprano (died 1830)

19 November

- Christian Lorenz Sommer, German classical philologist (died 1846)

25 November

- Andreas von Ettingshausen, German mathematician, physicist (died 1878)

30 November

- Carl Loewe, German composer (died 1869)

=== December ===
20 December – Simon Meister, German painter (died 1844) 29 December

- Johann Christian Poggendorff, German physicist (died 1877)
- Ferdinand von Wrangel, Baltic German explorer and Russian admiral (died 1870)

== Deaths ==
=== January–March ===
- 28 February – Friedrich Wilhelm Rust, German violinist (born 1739)
- 30 March – Princess Augusta Wilhelmine of Hesse-Darmstadt (born 1765)

=== April–June ===
- 9 April – Frederick Albert, Prince of Anhalt-Bernburg, German prince of the House of Ascania (born 1735)
- 6 May – Adolph Freiherr Knigge, German writer, Freemason (born 1752)
- 12 May – Johann Uz, German poet (born 1720)
- 17 May – Gotthard Friedrich Stender, Baltic-German Lutheran priest who played an outstanding role in Latvia's history of culture (born 1714)
- 16 June
  - Charles of Saxony, Duke of Courland, German prince from the House of Wettin and Duke of Courland (born 1733)
- 25 June – Johann Philipp Siebenkees, German philosopher (1759–1796)

=== July–September ===
- 11 September – Anna Barbara Gignoux, German industrialist (born 1725)

=== October–December ===
- 16 December – Johann Daniel Titius, German astronomer, professor at Wittenberg (born 1729)
