= 1949 in Germany =

- Decades: 1920s; 1930s; 1940s; 1950s; 1960s
- See also: Other events of 1949; History of Germany • Timeline • Years

Events in the year 1949 in the Allied-occupied Germany, then in West Germany and East Germany.

== Incumbents ==
=== West Germany ===
- President – Theodor Heuss (starting 13 September)
- Chancellor – Konrad Adenauer (starting 20 September)

=== East Germany ===
- Head of State – Wilhelm Pieck (starting 11 October)
- Head of Government – Otto Grotewohl (starting 12 October)

== Events ==
- 8 May - The Basic Law for the Federal Republic of Germany was approved in Bonn.
- 8 May - The Soviet War Memorial in East-Berlin is established.
- 12 May - The Berlin Blockade ends.
- 15/16 May - East German Constitutional Assembly election, 1949
- 14 August - West German federal election, 1949
- 16 September - Hamburger Morgenpost is first published.
- 20 September - The First Adenauer cabinet led by Konrad Adenauer was sworn in.
- 7 October - Constitution of East Germany
- Date unknown: Liebherr, a multinational equipment manufacturer, is founded in Baden-Württemberg, to build the mobile tower crane devised by Hans Liebherr.
- Date unknown: Germany company Heckler & Koch was founded.
- Date unknown: German company Adidas was founded.
- Date unknown: The Currywurst is invented by Herta Heuwer in Berlin.

== Births ==
- January 9 - Mary Roos, German singer
- January 15 - Jürgen Roters, German politician
- January 24 - Nikolaus Brender, German journalist
- February 5 - Kurt Beck, German politician
- February 13 - Jo Baier, German film director
- February 22 - Joachim Witt, German singer
- March 2 - Wolfgang Sandner, German physicist (died 2015)
- March 5 - Franz Josef Jung, German politician
- March 11 - Georg Schramm, German psychologist and Kabarett artist
- March 26 - Patrick Süskind, German writer
- April 5 - Klara Höfels, German actress and theatre director (died 2022)
- April 6 - Horst Ludwig Störmer, German physicist
- April 7 - Evelyn Haas, German judge
- April 11 - Bernd Eichinger, German film producer, director and screenwriter (died 2011)
- May 10 - Hans Reichel, German guitarist (died 2011)
- May 12
  - Raimund Hoghe, German choreographer (died 2021)
  - Hans Leyendecker, German journalist
- June 8 - Hildegard Falck, German athlete
- June 12 - Jens Böhrnsen, German politician
- June 13 - Ulla Schmidt, German politician
- June 15 - Elmar Hörig, German television presenter
- June 27 - Günther Schumacher, German track cyclist
- June 28 - Peter Gruss, German biologist
- June 29 - Kurt Schrimm, German prosecutor
- July 4 - Horst Seehofer, German politician
- July 19 - Maren Kroymann, German actress and singer
- August 3 - Fritz Egner, German television host
- August 22 - Christoph, Prince of Schleswig-Holstein, German nobleman, head of the House of Schleswig-Holstein-Sonderburg-Glücksburg
- August 30 - Peter Maffay, German singer
- September 2 - Frank Ripploh, German actor and film director (died 2002)
- September 3 - Volker Kauder, German politician
- September 19 - Richard Rogler, German Kabarett performer and comedian
- September 22 - Ludwig Schick, German bishop of Roman Catholic Church
- October 4 - Albrecht von Boeselager, German lawyer and forester
- October 18 - Erwin Sellering, German politician
- November 8 - Gabriele Krone-Schmalz, German journalist
- November 24 - Bruno Weil, German conductor

== Deaths ==
- January 5 - Max Bockmühl, German chemist (born 1882)
- January 10 - Erich von Drygalski, German geographer, geophysicist and polar scientist (born 1865)
- March 4 - Joannes Baptista Sproll, German bishop of Roman Catholic Church (born 1870)
- March 12 - August Bier, German surgeon (born 1861)
- March 25 - Prince August Wilhelm of Prussia, German nobleman (born 1887)
- March 28 - Theodor Seitz, German colonial politician (born 1863)
- March 30 - Friedrich Bergius, German chemist, Nobel Prize in Chemistry laureate (born 1884)
- April 8 – Wilhelm Adam, German general (born 1877)
- May 21 — Klaus Mann, German writer (born 1906)
- May 22 - Hans Pfitzner, German composer (born 1869)
- June 23 - Heinrich Schnee, German lawyer, colonial civil servant, politician, writer, and association official (born 1871)
- July 18 - Bernhard Hoetger, German painter and sculptor (born 1874)
- September 4 - Herbert Eulenberg, German author and poet (born 1876)
- September 8 - Richard Strauss, German composer (born 1864)
- September 14 - Gottfried Graf von Bismarck-Schönhausen, German politician (born 1901)
- October 21 - Johannes Bell, German politician (born 1868)
- November 23- Gustav Radbruch, German legal scholar and politician (born 1878)
- December 23 - Arthur Eichengrün, German chemist (born 1867)
- December 30 - Leopold IV, Prince of Lippe, sovereign of the Principality of Lippe (born 1871)
