= 1868 in Germany =

- Decades: 1840s; 1850s; 1860s; 1870s; 1880s
- See also: Other events of 1868; History of Germany • Timeline • Years

Events from the year 1868 in Germany.

== Incumbents ==
- King of Bavaria – Ludwig II
- King of Prussia – William I
- King of Saxony – John
- King of Württemberg – Charles of Württemberg
- Grand Duke of Baden – Frederick I

== Events ==
- 28 January – The Leipzig Opera House is inaugurated. It was destroyed during the 1943 Bombing of Leipzig.
- 8 March – 1868 Zollparlament election

=== Undated ===
- The Herrenhäuser Brewery is founded in Hanover.
- The liberal German People's Party is founded

== Births ==
- January 3 - Heinrich Brauns, German politician (died 1933)
- January 15 – Otto von Lossow, German general (died 1938)
- January 21 – Felix Hoffmann, German chemist (died 1946)
- March 1 - Sophie, Duchess of Hohenberg (Died 1914)
- March 1 - Alfred Henke, German politician (died 1946)
- March 4 -Friedrich Wilhelm Kopsch, German anatomist (died 1955)
- April 19 - Max von Schillings, German conductor (died 1933)
- May 13 - Otto Ritter von Dandl, German politician (died 1942)
- July 7 - Karl Bauer, German artist (died 1942)
- July 9 - Gustav Noske, German politician (died 1946)
- July 12 - Stefan George, German poet (died 1933)
- August 2 - Theodor Wolff, German writer and journalist (died 1943)
- August 10 - Paul Warburg, German/American banker (died 1932)
- September 23 - Johannes Bell, German politician (died 1949)
- October 8 - Max Slevogt, German painter (died 1932)
- November 2 - Wilhelm Kolle, German bacteriologist (died 1935)
- November 8 - Felix Hausdorff, German mathematician (died 1942)
- November 17 - Korbinian Brodmann, German neurologist and psychiatrist (died 1918)
- November 17 - Paul Hirsch, German politician (died 1940)
- November 25 - Ernest Louis, Grand Duke of Hesse, German nobleman (died 1937)
- November 25 - Ernst Däumig, German politician (died 1922)
- December 5 - Arnold Sommerfeld, German physicist (died 1951)
- December 9 - Fritz Haber, German chemist who received the Nobel Prize in Chemistry (died 1934)
- December 24 - Richard Teichmann, German chess master (died 1925)
- December 24 - Emanuel Lasker, German mathematician (died 1941)

== Deaths ==
- 8 January - Adolf Heinrich von Arnim-Boitzenburg, German statesman and politician (born 1803)
- 16 January - Theodor Schönemann, German mathematician (born 1812)
- 23 January - Heinrich von Brandt, German general (born 1789)
- 3 February - Karl Mathy, German politician (born 1807)
- 29 February - Ludwig I of Bavaria, German king of Bavaria from 1825 to 1848 (born 1786)
- 2 March - Carl Eberwein, German composer (born 1786)
- 22 May - Julius Plücker, German mathematician and physicist (born 1801)
- 29 May - Julius Friedrich Heinrich Abegg, German criminalist (born 1796)
- 18 July - Emanuel Leutze, German painter (born 1816), died in the United States
- 21 July - Friedrich Wilhelm Schubert, German historian (born 1799)
- 25 August – Charlotte Birch-Pfeiffer, German actress (born 1799)
- 29 August - Christian Friedrich Schönbein, German chemist (born 1799)
- 26 September - August Ferdinand Möbius, German mathematician (born 1790)
- 6 December - August Schleicher, German linguist (born 1821)
- 13 December - Carl Friedrich Philipp von Martius, German botanist and explorer (born 1794)
