= 1873 in Germany =

- Decades: 1850s; 1860s; 1870s; 1880s; 1890s
- See also: Other events of 1873; History of Germany • Timeline • Years

Events from the year 1873 in Germany.

== Incumbents ==
=== National level ===
- Emperor – William I
- Chancellor – Otto von Bismarck

=== State level ===
==== Kingdoms ====
- King of Bavaria – Ludwig II
- King of Prussia – William I
- King of Saxony – John to 29 October, then Albert
- King of Württemberg – Charles

==== Grand Duchies ====
- Grand Duke of Baden – Frederick I
- Grand Duke of Hesse – Louis III
- Grand Duke of Mecklenburg-Schwerin – Frederick Francis II
- Grand Duke of Mecklenburg-Strelitz – Frederick William
- Grand Duke of Oldenburg – Peter II
- Grand Duke of Saxe-Weimar-Eisenach - Charles Alexander

==== Principalities ====
- Schaumburg-Lippe – Adolf I, Prince of Schaumburg-Lippe
- Schwarzburg-Rudolstadt – George Albert, Prince of Schwarzburg-Rudolstadt
- Schwarzburg-Sondershausen – Günther Friedrich Karl II, Prince of Schwarzburg-Sondershausen
- Principality of Lippe – Leopold III, Prince of Lippe
- Reuss Elder Line – Heinrich XXII, Prince Reuss of Greiz
- Reuss Younger Line – Heinrich XIV, Prince Reuss Younger Line
- Waldeck and Pyrmont – George Victor, Prince of Waldeck and Pyrmont

==== Duchies ====
- Duke of Anhalt – Frederick I, Duke of Anhalt
- Duke of Brunswick – William, Duke of Brunswick
- Duke of Saxe-Altenburg – Ernst I, Duke of Saxe-Altenburg
- Duke of Saxe-Coburg and Gotha – Ernest II, Duke of Saxe-Coburg and Gotha
- Duke of Saxe-Meiningen – Georg II, Duke of Saxe-Meiningen

== Events ==
- 16 September – German troops leave France upon completion of payment of indemnity for the Franco-Prussian War.
- 22 October – Bismarck negotiates the League of the Three Emperors, ensuring an alliance between Austria-Hungary and the Russian Empire.
- Kattowitz is created as a district of Prussia.

=== Undated ===
- German company Hochtief is founded.

== Architecture ==
- 2 September – Berlin Victory Column inaugurated to celebrate the Second Schleswig War.

== Arts ==
=== Music ===
- Johannes Brahms premieres his String Quartet No. 1, Variations on a Theme by Haydn.

== Commerce ==
- The Baden gulden, the Bavarian gulden, the Bremen thaler, the Hamburg mark, the Hesse-Kassel vereinsthaler, the Mecklenburg vereinsthaler, the Prussian vereinsthaler, the Saxon vereinsthaler, the South German gulden and the Württemberg gulden are all abolished and replaced with the new single currency of the German Empire, the German gold mark.

== Education ==
- Establishment of the University of the Arts Bremen.
- German language university, the Deutsche Evangelische Oberschule, is established in Cairo, Egypt.
- Verein für Socialpolitik is established.

== Science ==
- Hermann von Helmholtz is awarded the Copley Medal "for his researches in physics and physiology".
- 31 May – Priam's Treasure was discovered by classical archaeologist Heinrich Schliemann.

== Transport ==
- Frankfurt South station is opened.
- The armoured frigate SMS Preußen is launched.

== Births ==
January

- 6 January – Karl Straube, German organist (died 1950)
- 13 January – Walther Bensemann, Jewish-German association football pioneer (died 1934)
- 24 January – Hermann Haupt, German entomologist (died 1959)
- 31 January – Melitta Bentz, German entrepreneur (died 1950)

February

- 2 February – Konstantin von Neurath, German diplomat and Nazi party chancellor (died 1956)
- 26 February – Rudolf Kanzler, German politician and paramilitary leader (died 1956)

March

- 10 March
  - Walter Friedländer, German art historian (died 1966)
  - Jakob Wassermann, Jewish-German novelist (died 1934)
- 17 March – Wilhelm Kreis, German architect (died 1955)
- 19 March – Max Reger, German composer, pianist, conductor, writer and professor at the Leipzig Conservatory (died 1916)
- 23 March – Richard Kolkwitz, German botanist (died 1956)

April

- 7 April – Friedrich von Oppeln-Bronikowski, German writer (died 1936)
- 27 April – Robert Wiene, German filmmaker (died 1938)

May

- 3 May – Richard von Kühlmann, German diplomat (died 1948)
- 14 May – Theodor von der Pfordten, Nazi paramilitary (died 1923)
- 21 May – Hans Berger, German neurologist (died 1941)
- 23 May – Leo Baeck, German rabbi (died 1956)
- 26 May – Hans Ludendorff, German astronomer (died 1941)

June

- 3 June – Otto Loewi, German pharmacologist and psychobiologist (died 1961)
- 7 June – Franz Weidenreich, Jewish-German anatomist (died 1948)
- 8 June – Franz Justus Rarkowski, German bishop of Roman-Catholic Church (died 1950)
- 16 June – Karl von Müller, German Imperial Navy captain (died 1923)
- 27 June – Jacob Moritz Blumberg, Jewish-German, surgeon (died 1955)
- 29 June – Leo Frobenius, German ethnologist (died 1938)
- 30 June – Friedrich Karl Georg Fedde, German botanist (died 1942)
- 30 June – Johannes Meisenheimer, German zoologist (died 1933)

July

- 2 July – Heinrich Hetsch, German physician (died 1947)

August

- 6 August – Otto von Feldmann, German Imperial Army officer and politician (died 1945)
- 20 August – Eugen Schmalenbach, German economist (died 1955)

September

- 2 September – Walter Lenck, German sculptor, painter, architect, cellist and composer (died 1952)
- 15 September – Otto Wels, German politician (died 1939)
- 29 September – Carl Wilhelm Erich Zimmer, German zoologist (died 1950)

October

- 5 October – Otto Falckenberg, German theatre director and writer (died 1947)
- 9 October – Karl Schwarzschild, German physicist (died 1916)
- 10 October – Duke Adolf Friedrich of Mecklenburg, German nobleman, explorer and politician (died 1969)

November

- 9 November – Fritz Thyssen, German industrialist (died 1951)
- 23 November – Otto Berg, German scientist (died 1939)
- 27 December – Rudolf Höber, German-American physician (died 1953)
- 28 December – Gotthard Fliegel, German geographer (died 1947)

== Deaths ==
February

- 2 February – Princess Charlotte of Württemberg, German noblewoman (born 1807)
- 9 February – Julius Fürst, Jewish-German orientalist (born 1805)
- 23 February – Jakob Freiherr von Hartmann, Bavarian general (born 1795)

March

- 10 March – Pauline Therese of Württemberg, Queen consort of Württemberg (born 1800)
- 26 March – Albrecht von Bernstorff, Prussian politician (born 1809)

April

- 18 April – Justus von Liebig, German chemist (born 1803)
- 24 April – Prince Adolf zu Hohenlohe-Ingelfingen, Prussian nobleman (born 1797)

May

- 12 May – Karl von Bodelschwingh-Velmede, German politician (born 1800)

June

- 6 June – Adalbert of Prussia, German prince (born 1811)
- 14 June – Friedrich Ludwig Georg von Raumer, German historian (born 1871)
- 21 June – Heinrich August Wilhelm Meyer, German Protestant theologian (born 1800)
- 29 June – Wolfgang Müller von Königswinter, German novelist (born 1816)

July

- 8 July – Franz Xaver Winterhalter, German painter (born 1805)

August

- 13 August – Fritz Bamberger (painter), Germany painter (born 1814)
- 18 August – Charles II, Duke of Brunswick, German nobleman (born 1804)

September

- 22 September – August Breithaupt, German mineralogist (born 1791)

October

- 10 October – Hermann Kurz, German writer and poet (born 1813)
- 13 October – Emil von Sydow, German geographer (born 1812)
- 29 October – John of Saxony, King of Saxony (born 1801)

November

- 26 November – Georg Amadeus Carl Friedrich Naumann, German mineralogist (born 1797)
- 14 December – Elisabeth Ludovika of Bavaria, Queen consort of Prussia (born 1801)
