= 1882 in Germany =

- Decades: 1860s; 1870s; 1880s; 1890s; 1900s
- See also: Other events of 1882; History of Germany • Timeline • Years

Events in the year 1882 in Germany.

== Incumbents ==
=== National level ===
- Emperor – William I
- Chancellor – Otto von Bismarck

=== State level ===
==== Kingdoms ====
- King of Bavaria – Ludwig II
- King of Prussia – William I
- King of Saxony – Albert
- King of Württemberg – Charles

==== Grand Duchies ====
- Grand Duke of Baden – Frederick I
- Grand Duke of Hesse – Louis IV
- Grand Duke of Mecklenburg-Schwerin – Frederick Francis II
- Grand Duke of Mecklenburg-Strelitz – Frederick William
- Grand Duke of Oldenburg – Peter II
- Grand Duke of Saxe-Weimar-Eisenach – Charles Alexander

==== Principalities ====
- Schaumburg-Lippe – Adolf I, Prince of Schaumburg-Lippe
- Schwarzburg-Rudolstadt – George Albert, Prince of Schwarzburg-Rudolstadt
- Schwarzburg-Sondershausen – Charles Gonthier, Prince of Schwarzburg-Sondershausen
- Principality of Lippe – Woldemar, Prince of Lippe
- Reuss Elder Line – Heinrich XXII, Prince Reuss of Greiz
- Reuss Younger Line – Heinrich XIV, Prince Reuss Younger Line
- Waldeck and Pyrmont – George Victor, Prince of Waldeck and Pyrmont

==== Duchies ====
- Duke of Anhalt – Frederick I, Duke of Anhalt
- Duke of Brunswick – William, Duke of Brunswick
- Duke of Saxe-Altenburg – Ernst I, Duke of Saxe-Altenburg
- Duke of Saxe-Coburg and Gotha – Ernst II, Duke of Saxe-Coburg and Gotha
- Duke of Saxe-Meiningen – Georg II, Duke of Saxe-Meiningen

== Events ==
- 24 March – the Tuberculosis bacillus causing tuberculosis, M. tuberculosis, was identified and described by Robert Koch.
- 28 March – German company Beiersdorf was founded.
- 29 April – the Electromote was the world's first vehicle run like a trolleybus, which was first presented to the public on April 29, 1882, by its inventor Ernst Werner von Siemens in Halensee, a suburb of Berlin, Germany.
- 20 May – Triple Alliance
- 23 June – Kiel Week in Kiel started.

== Births ==
- 24 February – Richard Beitzen, German Naval officer (died 1918)
- 10 March – Hans Steinhoff, German film director (died 1945)
- 16 March – Paul Lejeune-Jung, German economist and politician (died 1944)
- 23 March
  - Emmy Noether, German mathematician (died 1935)
  - Max Gülstorff, German actor (died 1947)
- 2 April – Herbert von Dirksen, German diplomat (died 1955)
- 7 April – Kurt von Schleicher, German politician and former Chancellor of Germany (died 1934)
- 9 April – Frederick Francis IV, Grand Duke of Mecklenburg-Schwerin (died 1945)
- 6 May – Wilhelm, German Crown Prince, German crown prince (died 1951)
- 10 May – Friedrich Marby, German rune occultist and Germanic revivalist (died 1966)
- 12 May – Duke Paul Frederick of Mecklenburg, nobleman (died 1904)
- 25 May – Ernst von Weizsäcker, German diplomat and politician (died 1951)
- 4 June – Karl Valentin, German actor and comedian (died 1948)
- 27 June – Eduard Spranger, German philosopher (died 1963)
- 29 June – Franz Seldte, German co-founder of the German Stahlhelm paramilitary organization, a Nazi politician, and Minister for Labour of the German Reich from 1933 to 1945 (died 1947)
- 23 July – Georg Jacoby, German film director and screenwriter (died 1964)
- 26 August – James Franck, German physicist (died 1964)
- 2 September – Max Bockmühl, German chemist (died 1949)
- 22 September – Wilhelm Keitel, German field marshal (died 1946)
- 24 September – Karl Rapp, German founder and owner of the Rapp Motorenwerke GmbH in Munich.(died 1962)
- 26 September – Eduard von der Heydt, German banker (died 1964)
- 30 September – Hans Geiger, German physicist (died 1945)
- 12 October - Hermann Wolfgang von Waltershausen, German composer and conductor (died 1954)
- 15 October – Heinrich Graf zu Dohna-Schlobitten, German general and resistance fighter (died 1944)
- 24 October – Paul Günther, German diver (died 1959)
- 30 October – Günther von Kluge, German field marshal (died 1944)
- 11 December – Max Born, German physicist and mathematician (died 1970)
- 14 December – Wilhelm Keppler, German businessman (died 1960)
- 16 December
  - Ernst Lissauer, German poet (died 1937)
  - Walther Meissner, German physicist (died 1974)

=== Date unknown ===
- Alice von Pechmann, German interior decorator (died 1976)

== Deaths ==
- 11 January — Theodor Schwann, German physiologist (born 1810)
- 13 January – Wilhelm Mauser, German weapon designer and manufacturer/industrialist (born 1834)
- 6 April – Friedrich Drake, German sculptor (born 1805)
- 29 May – Doris Devrient, German actress and singer (born 1801)
- 16 September – Theodore Eisfeld, German conductor (born 1816)
- 23 September – Friedrich Wöhler, German chemist (born 1800)
- 11 November – Wolfgang Franz von Kobell, German mineralogist and writer (born 1803)
- 13 November - Gottfried Kinkel, German poet (born 1815)
- 26 November – Otto Theodor von Manteuffel, Prussian Prime Minister (born 1805)
- 5 December – Theodor Ludwig Wilhelm von Bischoff, German biologist (born 1807)
