= 1801 in Germany =

- Decades: 1800s; 1810s; 1820s
- See also: Other events of 1801; History of Germany • Timeline • Years

Events from the year 1801 in Germany.

== Incumbents ==
=== Holy Roman Empire ===
- Francis II (5 July 1792 – 6 August 1806)

==== Important Electors ====
- Bavaria Maximilian I (16 February 1799 – 6 August 1806)
- Saxony Frederick Augustus I (17 December 1763 – 20 December 1806)

=== Kingdoms ===
- Kingdom of Prussia
  - Monarch – Frederick William III (16 November 1797 – 7 June 1840)

=== Grand Duchies ===
- Grand Duke of Mecklenburg-Schwerin
  - Frederick Francis I (24 April 1785 – 1 February 1837)
- Grand Duke of Mecklenburg-Strelitz
  - Charles II (2 June 1794 – 6 November 1816)
- Grand Duke of Oldenburg
  - Wilhelm (6 July 1785 – 2 July 1823) Due to mental illness, Wilhelm was duke in name only, with his cousin Peter, Prince-Bishop of Lübeck, acting as regent throughout his entire reign.
  - Peter I (2 July 1823 – 21 May 1829)
- Grand Duke of Saxe-Weimar
  - Karl August (1758–1809) Raised to grand duchy in 1809

=== Principalities ===
- Schaumburg-Lippe
  - George William (13 February 1787 – 1860)
- Schwarzburg-Rudolstadt
  - Louis Frederick II (13 April 1793 – 28 April 1807)
- Schwarzburg-Sondershausen
  - Günther Friedrich Karl I (14 October 1794 – 19 August 1835)
- Principality of Reuss-Greiz
  - Heinrich XIII (28 June 1800 – 29 January 1817)
- Waldeck and Pyrmont
  - Friedrich Karl August (29 August 1763 – 24 September 1812)

=== Duchies ===
- Duke of Anhalt-Dessau
  - Leopold III (16 December 1751 – 9 August 1817)
- Duke of Saxe-Altenburg
  - Duke of Saxe-Hildburghausen (1780–1826) - Frederick
- Duke of Saxe-Coburg-Saalfeld
  - Francis (8 September 1800 – 9 December 1806)
- Duke of Saxe-Meiningen
  - Georg I (1782–1803)
- Duke of Schleswig-Holstein-Sonderburg-Beck
  - Frederick Charles Louis (24 February 1775 – 25 March 1816)
- Duke of Württemberg
  - Frederick I (22 December 1797 – 30 October 1816)

=== Other ===
- Landgrave of Hesse-Darmstadt
  - Louis I (6 April 1790 – 14 August 1806)

== Events ==
- 9 February – The Treaty of Lunéville ends the War of the Second Coalition between France and Austria. Under the terms of the treaty, Aachen is officially annexed by France.

=== Date unknown ===
- Ultraviolet radiation is discovered by Johann Wilhelm Ritter.
- The magnum opus Disquisitiones Arithmeticae of Carl Friedrich Gauss is published.

== Births ==
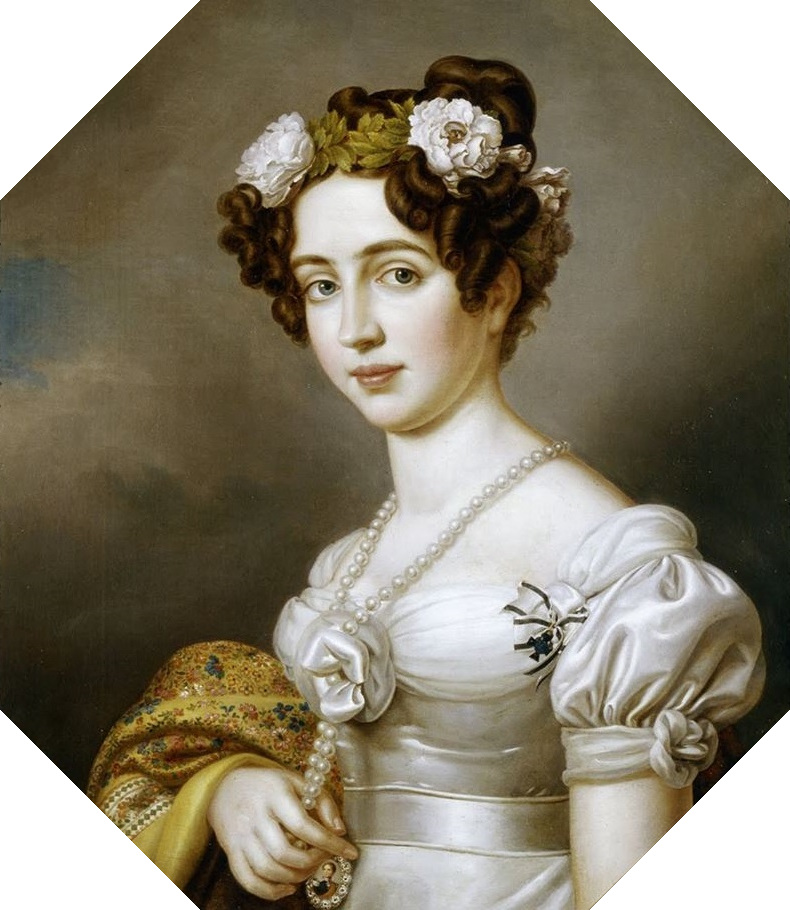
Elisabeth Ludovika of Bavaria

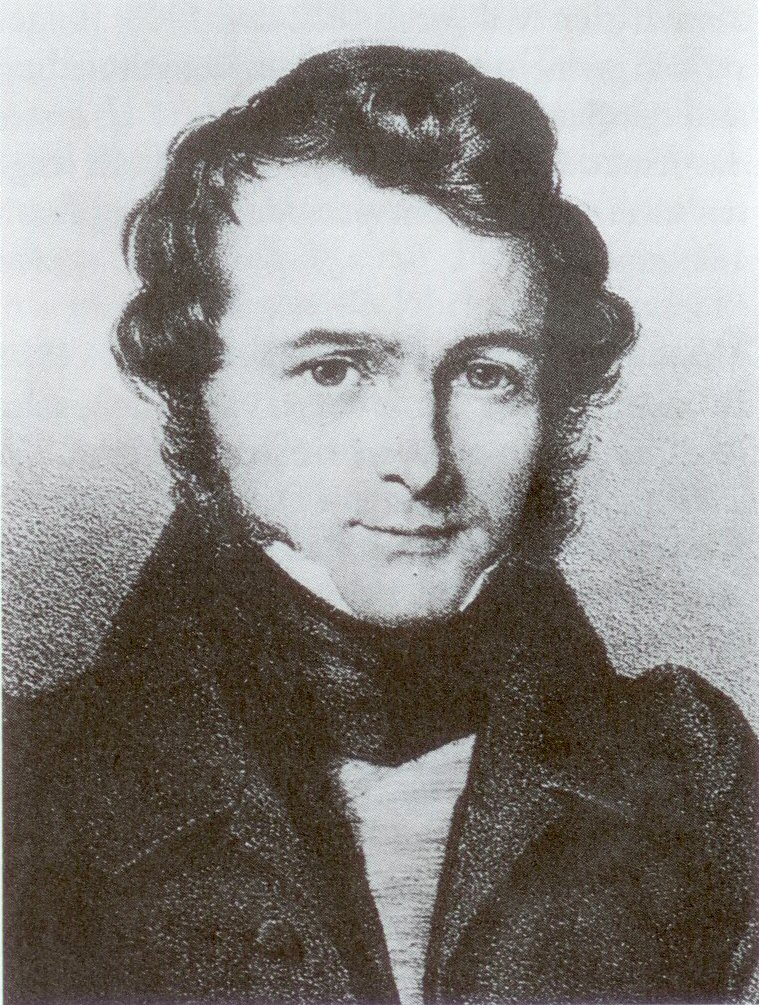
Christian Erich Hermann von Meyer

- 22 January – Friedrich Gerke, German pioneer of telegraphy (died 1888)
- 19 April – Gustav Fechner, German psychologist (died 1887)
- 16 June – Julius Plücker, German mathematician, physicist (died 1868)
- 14 July – Johannes Peter Müller, German physiologist, comparative anatomist, ichthyologist, and herpetologist (died 1858)
- 10 August – Christian Hermann Weisse, German Protestant religious philosopher (died 1866)
- 3 September – Christian Erich Hermann von Meyer, German palaeontologist (died 1869)
- 12 October – Carl August von Steinheil, German engineer, astronomer (died 1870)
- 23 October – Albert Lortzing, German composer (died 1851)
- 3 November – Karl Baedeker, German guidebook publisher (died 1859)
- 13 November – Queen Elisabeth Ludovika of Bavaria, queen of Prussia (died 1873)
- 24 November – Ludwig Bechstein, German writer and collector of folk tales (died 1860)
- 4 December – Karl Ludwig Michelet, German philosopher (died 1893)
- 11 December – Christian Dietrich Grabbe, German writer (died 1836)

=== Date unknown ===
- Thierry Hermès, German-born French businessman, founder of Hermès (died 1878)

== Deaths ==
- 14 March – Christian Friedrich Penzel, German musician and composer (born 1737)
- 25 March – Novalis, German poet (born 1772)
- 26 April – Karl Heinrich Heydenreich, German philosopher (born 1764)
- 14 May – Johann Ernst Altenburg, German composer, organist and trumpeter (born 1734)
- 19 September – Johann Gottfried Koehler, German astronomer (born 1745)
- 23 October – Johann Gottlieb Naumann, Kapellmeister, conductor and composer (born 1741)
