= 1871 in Germany =

- Decades: 1850s; 1860s; 1870s; 1880s; 1890s
- See also: Other events of 1871; History of Germany • Timeline • Years

Events from the year 1871 in Germany.

== Incumbents ==
=== National level ===
- Emperor (from 18 January) – William I
- Chancellor (from 21 March) – Otto von Bismarck

=== State level ===
==== Kingdoms ====
- King of Bavaria – Ludwig II
- King of Prussia – William I
- King of Saxony – John
- King of Württemberg – Charles

==== Grand Duchies ====
- Grand Duke of Baden – Frederick I
- Grand Duke of Hesse – Louis III
- Grand Duke of Mecklenburg-Schwerin – Frederick Francis II
- Grand Duke of Mecklenburg-Strelitz – Frederick William
- Grand Duke of Oldenburg – Peter II
- Grand Duke of Saxe-Weimar-Eisenach – Charles Alexander

==== Principalities ====
- Schaumburg-Lippe – Adolf I, Prince of Schaumburg-Lippe
- Schwarzburg-Rudolstadt – George Albert, Prince of Schwarzburg-Rudolstadt
- Schwarzburg-Sondershausen – Günther Friedrich Karl II, Prince of Schwarzburg-Sondershausen
- Principality of Lippe – Leopold III, Prince of Lippe
- Reuss Elder Line – Heinrich XXII, Prince Reuss of Greiz
- Reuss Younger Line – Heinrich XIV, Prince Reuss Younger Line
- Waldeck and Pyrmont – George Victor, Prince of Waldeck and Pyrmont

==== Duchies ====
- Duke of Anhalt – Leopold IV, Duke of Anhalt to 22 May, then Frederick I, Duke of Anhalt
- Duke of Brunswick – William, Duke of Brunswick
- Duke of Saxe-Altenburg – Ernst I, Duke of Saxe-Altenburg
- Duke of Saxe-Coburg and Gotha – Ernest II, Duke of Saxe-Coburg and Gotha
- Duke of Saxe-Meiningen – Georg II, Duke of Saxe-Meiningen

== Events ==
- 3 January – Battle of Bapaume. Prussian victory in continuing Franco-Prussian War.
- 10 January – Besieged city of Péronne surrenders to Prussian forces.
- 10–12 January – Battle of Le Mans, ends French resistance in western France.
- 15–17 January – Battle of the Lisaine. Prussian victory.
- 18 January – The member-states of the North German Federation and the south German states unite into a single nation-state known as the German Empire. The King of Prussia is declared the first German Emperor as Wilhelm I of Germany.
- 19 January – Battle of St. Quentin. Prussian victory defeats French attempts to relieve the besieged city of Paris.
- 19–20 January – Battle of Buzenval. Prussian victory.
- 28 January – Siege of Paris ends, with the city falling to Prussian forces.
- 15 February – Armistice signed between France and Prussia.
- 18 February – Siege of Belfort ends with surrender of French garrison.
- 26 February – Treaty of Versailles ends the Franco-Prussian War.
- 3 March – German federal election, 1871
- 21 March – Otto von Bismarck is appointed as the first Imperial Chancellor of the German Empire and his Bismarck cabinet was sworn in.
- 16 April – Constitution of the German Empire, the basic law of the German Empire of 1871–1918, passed by German Reichtstag and coming into effect on 4 May 1871.
- 10 May – Treaty of Frankfurt is signed with confirming the frontiers between Germany and France.
- 15 May – The Strafgesetzbuch, which goes back to the Penal Code of the North German Confederation, passed in Reichstag. It came into effect on January 1, 1872.
- 10 December – Otto von Bismarck tries to ban Catholics from the political stage by introducing harsh laws concerning the separation of church and state.

=== Undated ===
- The provinces of Alsace and Lorraine are transferred from France to Germany.
- The Constitution of the German Empire abolishes all restrictions on Jewish marriage, choice of occupation, place of residence, and property ownership. Exclusion from government employment and discrimination in social relations remain in effect.
- The Pulpit Law is passed by the Reichstag
- The Strafgesetzbuch is passed by the Reichstag, largely identical to the Penal Code of the North German Confederation.
- German company Continental is founded in Hannover.
- Federal Institute for Materials Research and Testing is founded.
- German company Hoesch AG is founded in Dortmund.

== Births ==
=== January to June ===
- 21 January – Hermann Blau, German chemist and inventor (died 1944)
- 4 February – Friedrich Ebert, President of Germany (died 1925)
- 4 February – Heinrich Schnee, German lawyer, colonial civil servant, politician, writer, and association official (died 1949)
- 13 February – Joseph Vollmer, German engineer (died 1955)
- 18 February – Ludwig Woltmann, German zoologist (died 1907)
- 21 February – Paul Cassirer, art dealer (died 1926)
- 5 March – Rosa Luxemburg, German Jewish politician (died 1919)
- 27 March – Heinrich Mann, German writer (died 1950)
- 29 March – Fritz Cassirer, conductor (died 1926)
- 13 April – Otto Treßler, German actor (died 1965)
- 21 April – Leo Blech, German composer and conductor (died 1958)
- 6 May – Christian Morgenstern, German author and poet (died 1914)
- 18 May – Fanny zu Reventlow, German artist and writer (died 1918)
- 30 May – Leopold IV, Prince of Lippe, sovereign of the Principality of Lippe (died 1949)
- 12 June – Ernst Stromer, German paleontologist (died 1952)

=== July to December ===
- 13 August – Karl Liebknecht, German politician (died 1919)
- 21 August – Hugo Graf von und zu Lerchenfeld auf Köfering und Schönberg, German politician (died 1944)
- 14 September – Karl Joseph Schulte, cardinal of Roman Catholic Church (died 1941)
- 19 September – Fritz Schaudinn, German zoologist (died 1906)
- 20 December – Andreas Blunck, German politician (died 1933)

== Deaths ==
- 4 February – Hermann, Fürst von Pückler-Muskau, German nobleman (born 1822)
- 18 March – Georg Gottfried Gervinus, German politician, literary and political historian (born 1805)
- 4 April – Peter von Hess, German painter (born 1792)
- 23 April – Ignaz von Olfers, German historian and naturalist (born 1793)
- 22 May – Leopold IV, Duke of Anhalt, German nobleman (born 1794)
