= 1869 in Germany =

- Decades: 1840s; 1850s; 1860s; 1870s; 1880s
- See also: Other events of 1869; History of Germany • Timeline • Years

Events from the year 1869 in Germany.

== Incumbents ==
- King of Bavaria – Ludwig II
- King of Prussia – William I
- King of Saxony – John
- King of Württemberg – Charles of Württemberg
- Grand Duke of Baden – Frederick I

== Events ==
- 9 May – The German Alpine Club is founded
- 15 June – The Second German North Polar Expedition departs from Bremerhaven
- 20 August – Kunsthalle Hamburg opened.
- 5 September – The foundation stone is laid for Neuschwanstein Castle in Bavaria.

=== Undated ===
- First Deutsches Derby horse race takes place.

== Births ==
- 25 January – Max Hoffmann, German general (died 1927)
- 3 February – Johann Becker, German politician (died 1951)
- 8 March – Rudolf Wissell, politician (died 1962)
- 15 February – Hans Schrader, German archaeologist (died 1948)
- 11 May – Erhard Riecke, German dermatologist and venereologist (died 1939)
- 12 May – Carl Schuhmann, German gymnast (died 1946)
- 18 May – Rupprecht, Crown Prince of Bavaria, German nobleman (died 1955)
- 29 May – Ulrich von Brockdorff-Rantzau, German diplomat (died 1928)
- 6 June – Siegfried Wagner, German composer and conductor (died 1930)
- 27 June – Hans Spemann, German embryologist, Nobel Prize in Physiology or Medicine (died 1941)
- 13 August – Paul Behncke, German admiral (died 1937)
- 31 August – Carl von Opel, German automotive pioneer (died 1927)
- 22 October – Oskar Hergt, German politician (died 1967)
- 4 November – Fritz Schumacher, German architect (died 1947)
- 4 December – Otto Landsberg, German politician (died 1957)

== Deaths ==
- 19 January – Carl Reichenbach, German chemist, geologist, metallurgist, naturalist, industrialist and philosopher (born 1788)
- 8 February – Karl Gildemeister, German architect (born 1820)
- 10 March – Carl Theodor Welcker, German journalist and politician (born 1790)
- 11 March – Christian August II, Duke of Schleswig-Holstein-Sonderburg-Augustenburg, German nobleman (born 1798)
- 2 April – Christian Erich Hermann von Meyer, German palaeontologist (born 1801)
- 15 July – Carl Friedrich Wilhelm Duncker, German publisher (born 1781)
- 22 July – Julius Braun, German historian (born 1825)
- 12 November – Johann Friedrich Overbeck, German painter (born 1789), died in Italy
- 22 November – Carl Ferdinand Langhans, German architect (born 1782)
- 24 November – Anton Westermann, German philologist (born 1806)
