= 1803 in Germany =

- Decades: 1800s; 1810s; 1820s
- See also: Other events of 1803; History of Germany • Timeline • Years

Events in the year 1803 in Germany

== Incumbents ==
=== Holy Roman Empire ===
- Francis II (5 July 1792 – 6 August 1806)

==== Important Electors ====
- Baden- Charles Frederick (27 April 1803 – 6 August 1806)
- Bavaria- Maximilian I (16 February 1799 – 6 August 1806)
- Saxony- Frederick Augustus I (17 December 1763 – 20 December 1806)
- Württemberg - Frederick I (1803 – 30 October 1816)

=== Kingdoms ===
- Kingdom of Prussia
  - Monarch – Frederick William III (16 November 1797 – 7 June 1840)

=== Grand Duchies ===
- Grand Duke of Mecklenburg-Schwerin
  - Frederick Francis I (24 April 1785 – 1 February 1837)
- Grand Duke of Mecklenburg-Strelitz
  - Charles II (2 June 1794 – 6 November 1816)
- Grand Duke of Oldenburg
  - Wilhelm (6 July 1785 – 2 July 1823) Due to mental illness, Wilhelm was duke in name only, with his cousin Peter, Prince-Bishop of Lübeck, acting as regent throughout his entire reign.
  - Peter I (2 July 1823 – 21 May 1829)
- Grand Duke of Saxe-Weimar
  - Karl August (1758–1809) Raised to grand duchy in 1809

=== Principalities ===
- Schaumburg-Lippe
  - George William (13 February 1787 – 1860)
- Schwarzburg-Rudolstadt
  - Louis Frederick II (13 April 1793 – 28 April 1807)
- Schwarzburg-Sondershausen
  - Günther Friedrich Karl I (14 October 1794 – 19 August 1835)
- Principality of Lippe
  - Leopold II (5 November 1802 – 1 January 1851)
- Principality of Reuss-Greiz
  - Heinrich XIII (28 June 1800 – 29 January 1817)
- Waldeck and Pyrmont
  - Friedrich Karl August (29 August 1763 – 24 September 1812)

=== Duchies ===
- Duke of Anhalt-Dessau
  - Leopold III (16 December 1751 – 9 August 1817)
- Duke of Saxe-Altenburg
  - Duke of Saxe-Hildburghausen (1780–1826) - Frederick
- Duke of Saxe-Coburg-Saalfeld
  - Francis (8 September 1800 – 9 December 1806)
- Duke of Saxe-Meiningen
  - Bernhard II (24 December 1803 – 20 September 1866)
- Duke of Schleswig-Holstein-Sonderburg-Beck
  - Frederick Charles Louis (24 February 1775 – 25 March 1816)

=== Other ===
- Landgrave of Hesse-Darmstadt
  - Louis I (6 April 1790 – 14 August 1806)

== Events ==
- 25 February – A major redistribution of territorial sovereignty within the Holy Roman Empire is enacted via an act known as the Reichsdeputationshauptschluss.
- 30 May – Following Britain's declaration of war on France, Édouard Mortier leads 12,000 troops in an Invasion of Hanover
- 5 July – The convention of Artlenburg confirms the French occupation of Hanover (which had been ruled by the British king).

== Births ==
=== January–June ===
- 15 February
  - John Sutter, pioneer (died 1880)
  - Karl Friedrich Schimper, botanist, naturalist and poet (died 1867)
- 26 February – Arnold Adolph Berthold, physiologist and zoologist (died 1861)
- 17 March Carl Jacob Löwig, chemist (died 1890)
- 12 May – Justus von Liebig, chemist (died 1873)

=== July–December ===
- 8 July – Julius Mosen, poet (died 1867)
- 17 July – Johann Samuel Eduard d'Alton, anatomist (died 1854)
- 19 July – Wolfgang Franz von Kobell, mineralogist and writer (died 1882)
- 5 October – Friedrich Bernhard Westphal, painter (died 1844)
- 29 November – Gottfried Semper, architect (died 1879)
- 26 September – Adrian Ludwig Richter, German painter (died 1884)
- 6 October – Heinrich Wilhelm Dove, German physicist and meteorologist (died 1879)
- 31 December – Johann Carl Fuhlrott, German paleoanthropologist (died 1877)

== Deaths ==
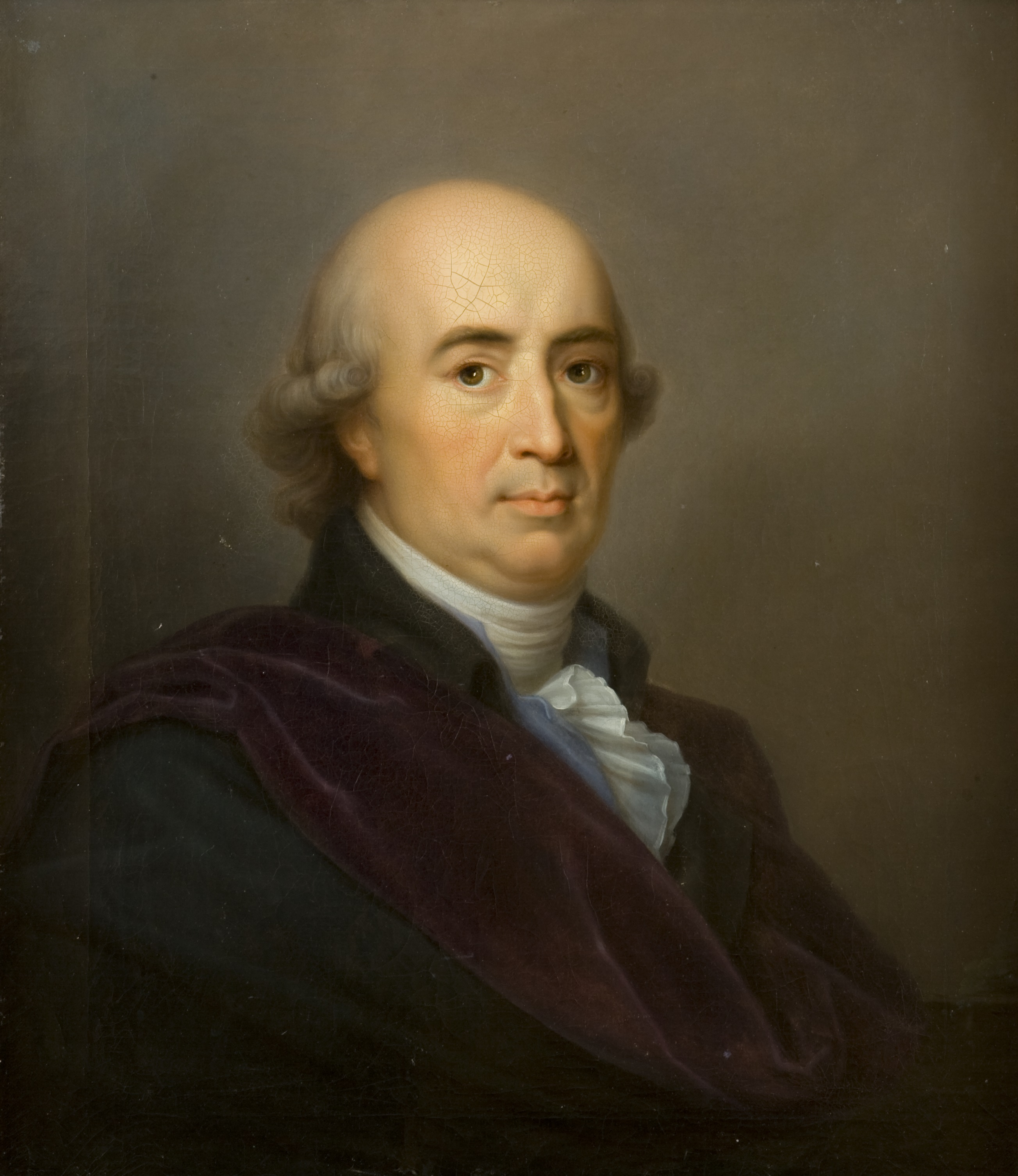
Johann Gottfried Herder

=== January–June ===
- 18 February – Johann Wilhelm Ludwig Gleim, poet (born 1719)
- 14 March – Friedrich Gottlieb Klopstock, poet (born 1724)

=== July–December ===
- 18 December – Johann Gottfried Herder, philosopher and writer (born 1744)
