= 1802 in Germany =

- Decades: 1800s; 1810s; 1820s
- See also: Other events of 1802; History of Germany • Timeline • Years

Events from the year 1802 in Germany.

== Incumbents ==
=== Holy Roman Empire ===
- Francis II (5 July 1792 – 6 August 1806)

==== Important Electors ====
- Bavaria- Maximilian I (16 February 1799 – 6 August 1806)
- Saxony- Frederick Augustus I (17 December 1763 – 20 December 1806)

=== Kingdoms ===
- Kingdom of Prussia
  - Monarch – Frederick William III (16 November 1797 – 7 June 1840)

=== Grand Duchies ===
- Grand Duke of Mecklenburg-Schwerin
  - Frederick Francis I– (24 April 1785 – 1 February 1837)
- Grand Duke of Mecklenburg-Strelitz
  - Charles II (2 June 1794 – 6 November 1816)
- Grand Duke of Oldenburg
  - Wilhelm (6 July 1785 – 2 July 1823) Due to mental illness, Wilhelm was duke in name only, with his cousin Peter, Prince-Bishop of Lübeck, acting as regent throughout his entire reign.
  - Peter I (2 July 1823 – 21 May 1829)
- Grand Duke of Saxe-Weimar
  - Karl August (1758–1809) Raised to grand duchy in 1809

=== Principalities ===
- Schaumburg-Lippe
  - George William (13 February 1787 – 1860)
- Schwarzburg-Rudolstadt
  - Louis Frederick II (13 April 1793 – 28 April 1807)
- Schwarzburg-Sondershausen
  - Günther Friedrich Karl I (14 October 1794 – 19 August 1835)
- Principality of Lippe
  - Leopold II (5 November 1802 – 1 January 1851)
- Principality of Reuss-Greiz
  - Heinrich XIII (28 June 1800 – 29 January 1817)
- Waldeck and Pyrmont
  - Friedrich Karl August (29 August 1763 – 24 September 1812)

=== Duchies ===
- Duke of Anhalt-Dessau
  - Leopold III (16 December 1751 – 9 August 1817)
- Duke of Brunswick
  - Frederick William (16 October 1806 – 16 June 1815)
- Duke of Saxe-Altenburg
  - Duke of Saxe-Hildburghausen (1780–1826) - Frederick
- Duke of Saxe-Coburg-Saalfeld
  - Francis (8 September 1800 – 9 December 1806)
- Duke of Saxe-Meiningen
  - Bernhard II (24 December 1803 – 20 September 1866)
- Duke of Schleswig-Holstein-Sonderburg-Beck
  - Frederick Charles Louis (24 February 1775 – 25 March 1816)
- Duke of Württemberg - Frederick I (1797–1803)

== Other ==
- Landgrave of Hesse-Darmstadt
  - Louis I (6 April 1790 – 14 August 1806)
- Margrave of Baden- Charles Frederick (21 October 1771 – 27 April 1803)

== Events ==
- 3 March – Ludwig van Beethoven publishes his Piano Sonata No. 14, commonly known as the "Moonlight Sonata" (Mondschein), in Vienna; the availability of the sheet music is announced by Giovanni Cappi in the newspaper Wiener Zeitung.
- Johann Wilhelm Ritter builds the first electrochemical cell.

== Births ==
- 2 May – Heinrich Gustav Magnus, German chemist, physicist (died 1870)
- 26 May – Karl Ferdinand Ranke, German educator (died 1876)
- 2 June – Karl Lehrs, German classicist (died 1878)
- 17 June – Hermann Goldschmidt, German painter and astronomer (died 1866)
- 26 August – Ludwig Michael Schwanthaler, German sculptor (died 1848)
- 29 November – Wilhelm Hauff, German poet and novelist (died 1827)
- Ernst Friedrich Zwirner, Silesian-born architect working in Germany (died 1861)

=== Date unknown ===
- Friedrich Hohe, German lithographer, painter (died 1870)

== Deaths ==
- 5 June – Johann Christian Gottlieb Ernesti, German classicist (born 1756)
- 29 June – Johann Jakob Engel, German teacher and writer (born 1741)
- 25 July – Friedrich Karl Joseph von Erthal, Archbishop of Mainz (born 1719)
- 10 August – Franz Aepinus, German natural philosopher (born 1724)
