= Theodor Brüggemann =

German politician, jurist and educationist

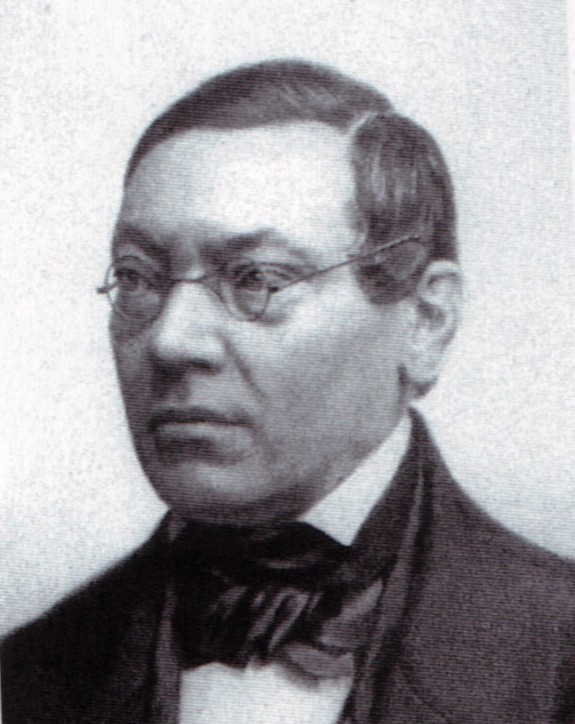

Theodor Brüggemann (31 March 1796 – 6 March 1866) was an energetic school teacher who became a Prussian government official and a politician.

== Life ==
Johann Heinrich Theodor Brüggemann was born in Soest, a small town to the east of Dortmund which at the time of his birth still had not recovered from the devastation of the Thirty Years' War at the start of the century. He was the child of a mixed marriage: his father was a catholic brandy distiller. His mother was a Protestant. Brüggemann attended the gymnasium (school) in Soest before moving on to the Academy at Münster. Here one of his philosophy teachers was the theologian Georg Hermes.

It was on Hermes' recommendation that in 1814 he became a teacher of ancient languages at the gymnasium (secondary school) in Düsseldorf, becoming one of its three administrative directors in 1823 and taking over as the institution's head shortly afterwards. It was a mark of the reputation he acquired in his Düsseldorf school that in 1831 the king appointed him to the provincial "Schulcollegium" and a member of the regional government, based in Coblenz. In 1837 he led a special commission on behalf of the Minister for Culture, Karl vom Stein zum Altenstein to Rome in order to serve in the Prussian diplomatic mission there in the context of the disputes characterised in historical sources as the Cologne questions. After spending several years away from Koblenz, working for the government in Berlin and Rome, he had lost day-to-day involvement with his "Schulcollegium" responsibilities, and he was accordingly given continuing government employment in Berlin: from 1839 he was a permanent assistant in the Ministry for Culture in the department for teaching. In 1841 he became a privy counsellor and in 1843 he was given responsibilities in respect of catholic schools and colleges. Further privy council promotion followed.

Alongside this, between 1849 and 1864 he served as a member of the Disciplinary Tribunal for non-judicial public officials. Between 1859 and 1864 he was a member of the Examination Commission for admission to higher public service. However, he resigned from his senior government posts in 1864, following a stroke.

Within the Prussian government's schools administration department, Brüggemann was the highest ranking Roman Catholic. Although the Prussian Rhine Province was predominantly Roman Catholic, the greater part of Prussia had been led towards Protestantism during and after the religious turbulence of the sixteenth century. Brüggemann tried to prevent the removal of Catholic influences from schools and universities. His influence and effectiveness in this respect were not limitless, however.

In 1855 he became an honorary member of the Student League of the Catholic Reading Association (founded in 1853, and now more regularly known as the Askania-Burgundia fraternity).

== Political ==
As a pupil of Georg Hermes the young Brüggemann adhered to his teacher's rationalist theology, heavily permeated by the moral philosophy of Fichte and Kant. However, by the time of the so-called Cologne turmoil of the mid 1830s, Brüggemann had become very much more conservative in his strong catholic observance than his former mentor.

Around 1846 he tried, without success, to set up a pro-government newspaper in the Rhineland. In 1850 he was a member of the upper house in the short-lived Erfurt Union Parliament, a Prussian led initiative which attempted to build on the pan-German Frankfurt Parliament of 1848/49, but without its dangerously radical aspects and also, as matters turned out, without Austria. Meanwhile, between 1849 and 1854 he also sat as a member in the first chamber of the Prussian Parliament ("Landtag"), where he was a leading voice for the country's catholic minority. Between 1851 and 1854 he was a vice-president of the chamber. Between 1854 and 1866 the king made him a member for life of the upper house, in which he served as vice-president of the chamber between 1854 and 1855.
