= August Ahlborn =

German painter (1796–1857)

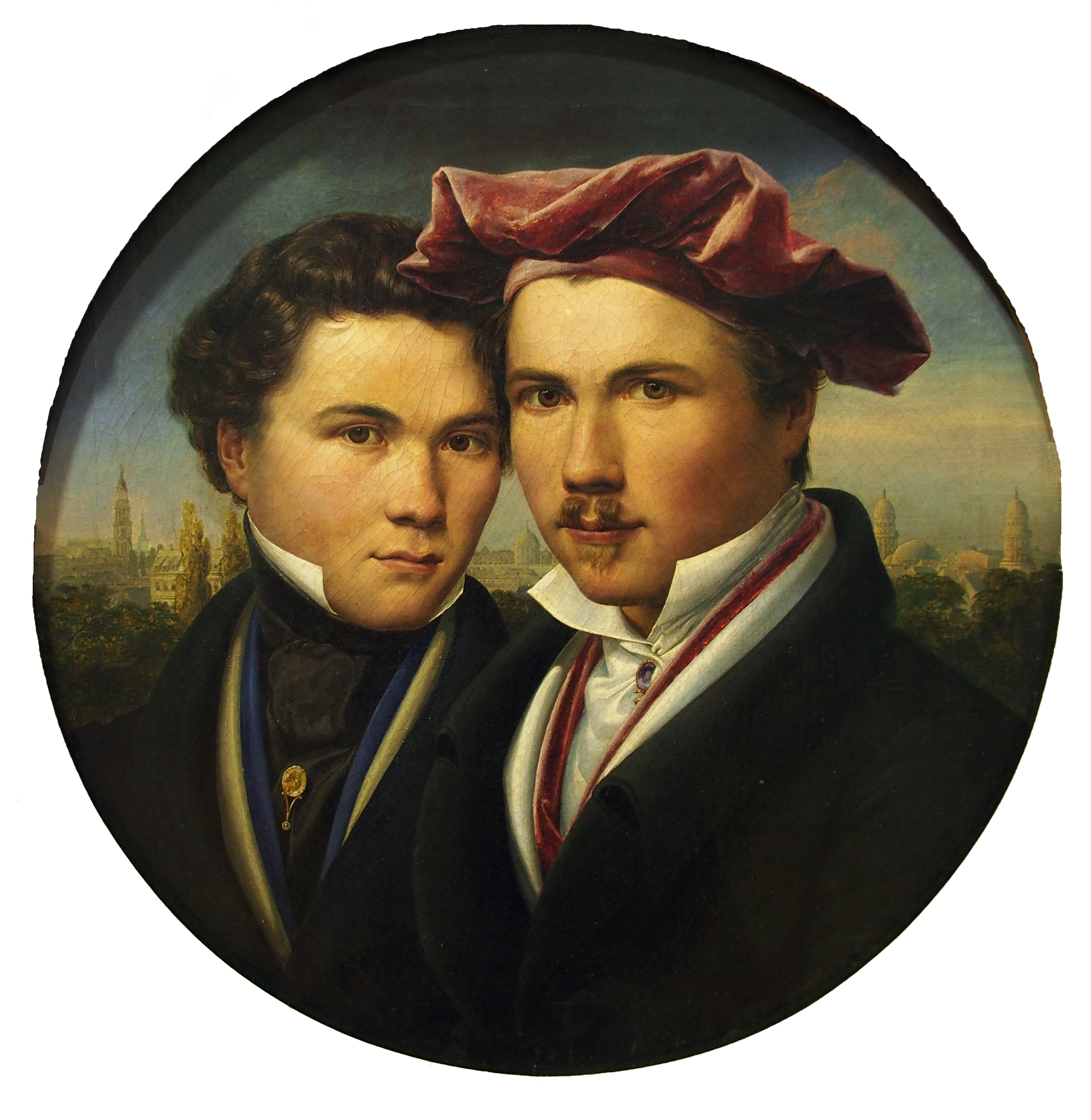
- Self-portrait (1827), Ahlborn Wilhelm with his brother
- Born: August Wilhelm Julius Ahlborn; October 11, 1796; Hanover, Holy Roman Empire
- Died: 24 August 1857 (aged 60); Rome, Italy
- Education: Prussian Academy of Arts

August Wilhelm Julius Ahlborn (October 11, 1796 – August 24, 1857) was a German landscape painter.

== Life ==
Ahlborn was born in Hanover, son of the Hanoverian master tailor Heinrich Christian Ahlborn and Dorothea Elisabeth Röllecke. He entered the Prussian Academy of Arts (Berlin) in 1819, where he studied with Karl Wilhelm Wach.

In 1826 he received the Academy Award for a portrait of the New Palace in Potsdam and used the money to travel to Italy in 1827, where he was one of the founders of the Roman Kunstverein. In this period, he lived in Rome, Florence, and Ascoli. In December 1832, he married Therese, the daughter of a government official, in Berlin. In 1833 he became a member of the Prussian Academy. In Italy, Ahlborn and his wife converted to Roman Catholicism from Lutheranism, on August 15, 1837. His paintings are mainly of Italian, North German, and Tyrolean landscapes, but also include a few portraits and religious works. Many of his works were in the possession of the royal family of Prussia.

Ahlborn died in Rome in 1857.

== Works ==
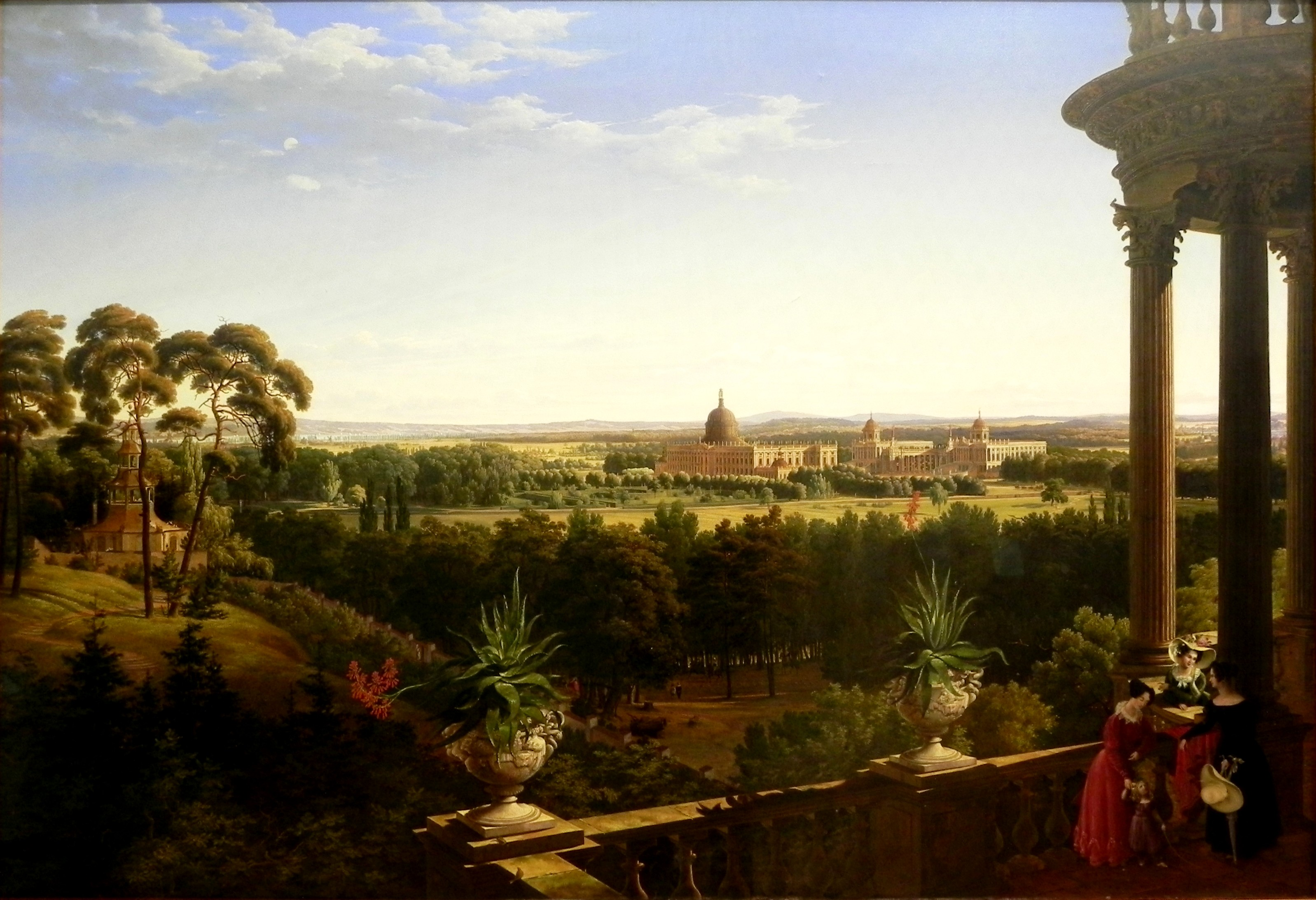
View of the New Palace in Potsdam, 1826

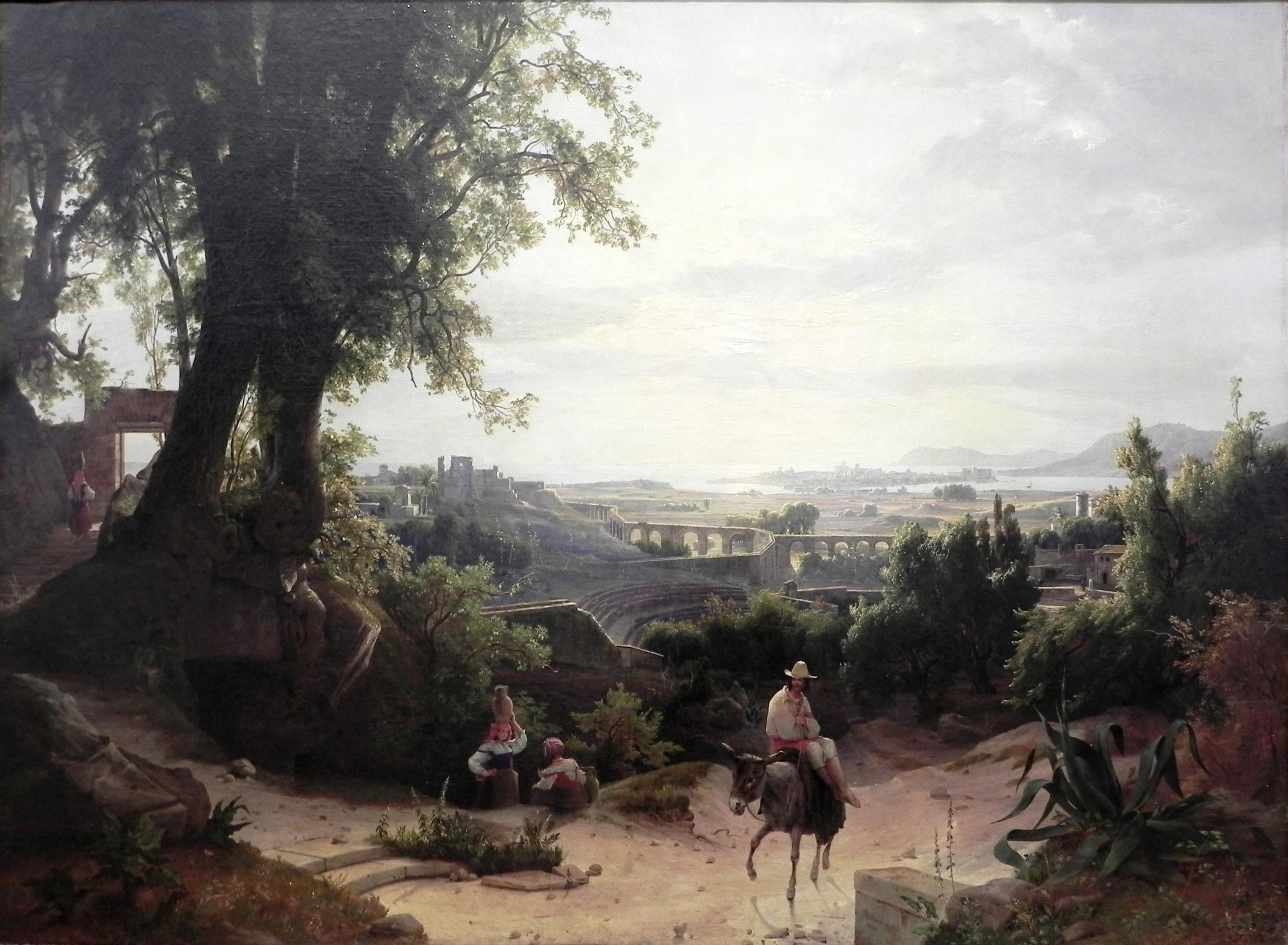
Syracuse in morning light, 1836

- Gothic cathedral on the waterfront, 1823. (inspired by a work by Karl Friedrich Schinkel)
- The Paulinzella monastery ruins, 1824, oil on canvas, 86 × 111 cm, Thuringian State Museum, Heidecksburg.
- View of the New Palace in Potsdam, 1826, 124.8 x 185 cm, Lower Saxony State Museum, Hanover.
- Coastline at the Gulf of Naples, 1832, oil on canvas, 24 × 80.2 cm, Lower Saxony State Museum, Hanover.
- Vision of the Golden Flower, 1832.
- View of Florence, in 1832, Alte Nationalgalerie, Berlin.
- Mountain Landscape, 1835.
- Syracuse, Sicily in morning light, 1836, Lower Saxony State Museum, Hanover.
- View of Spoleto, in 1840, Lower Saxony State Museum, Hanover.
- Ruins of the Villa Mills on the Palatine Hill in Rome, 1843, oil on canvas, 33.2 × 46.8 cm.
- Mount Vesuvius landscape, 1852, oil on canvas, 37.5 × 45.5 cm.
- View of the Lake Como, oil on canvas, 100 × 138 cm.
- Selfportrait with brother, down picture, diameter 43 cm, 1827, Lower Saxony State Museum, Hanover (in the background Cityscape Berlin).
- Coast at Amalfi, 1833, Ballarat Art Gallery, Victoria, Australia

== Gallery ==
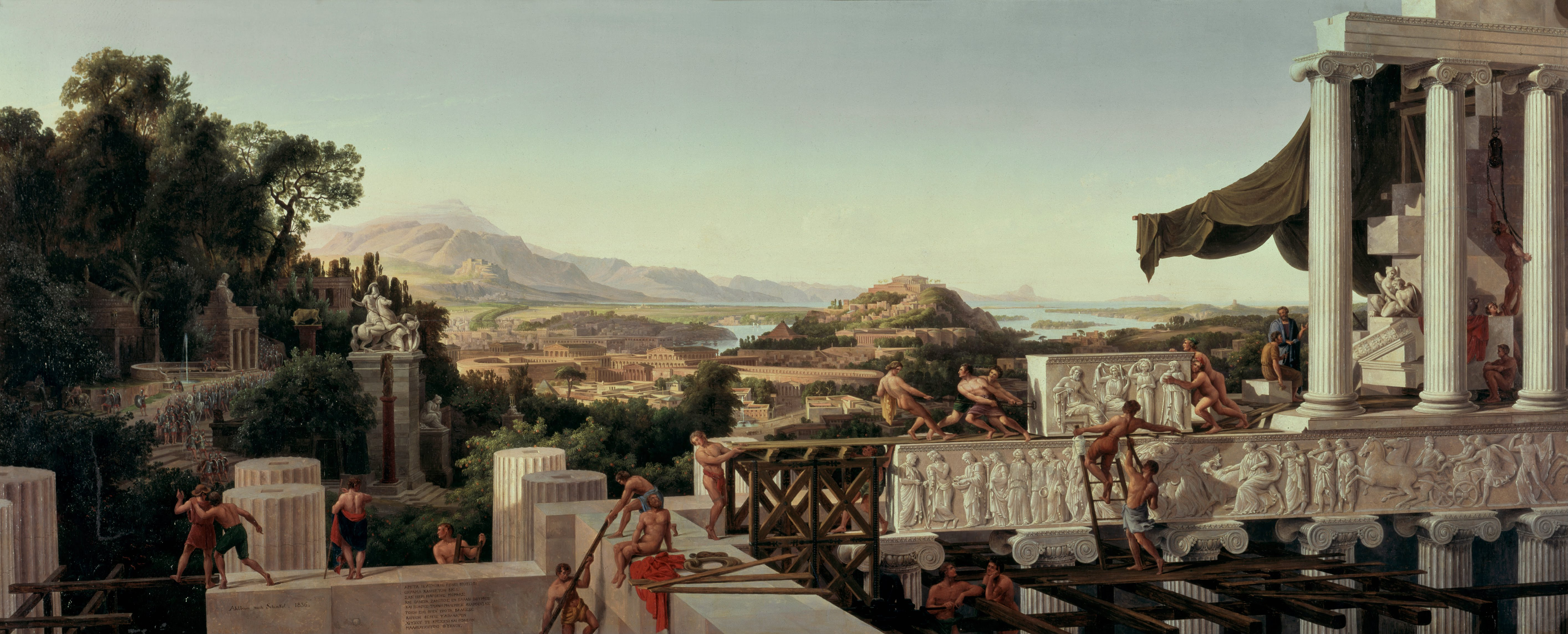
''Blick in Griechenlands Blüte'' (View of the Flower of Greece). Oil on canvas, 94 cm x 235 cm. 1836.

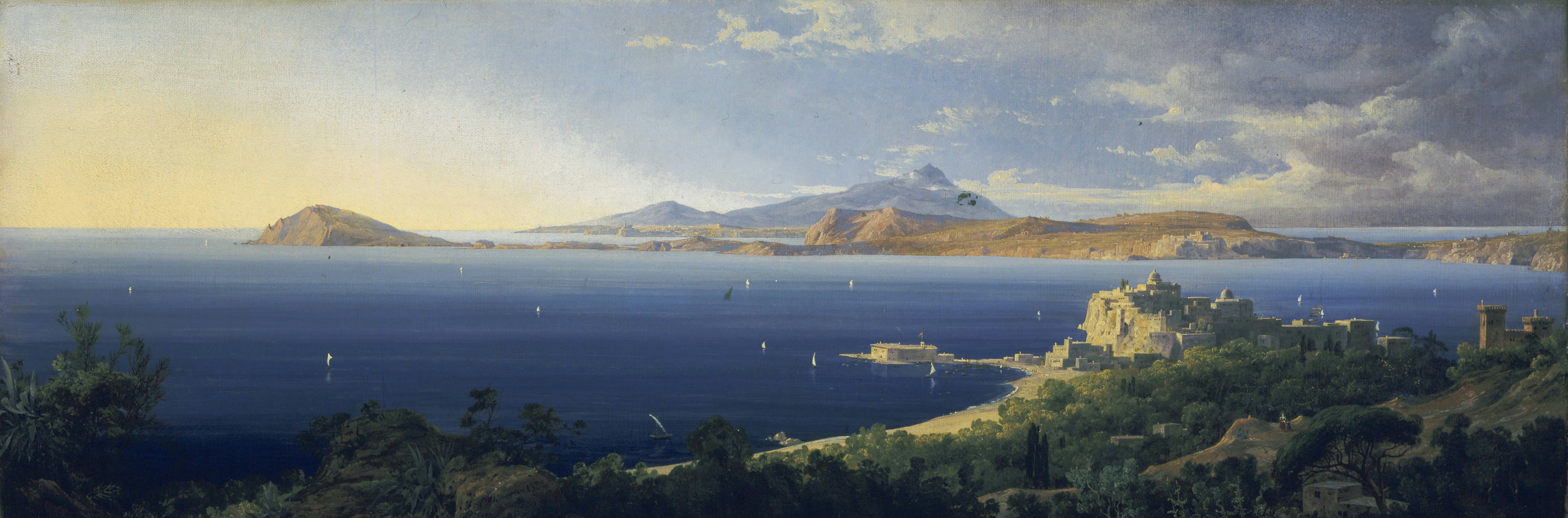
"Die Bucht von Pozzuoli bei Neapel" (The Bay of Pozzuoli near Naples). 1832.
