= Elmar Hörig =

- Born: 15 June 1949 (age 76)
- Occupations: Radio and television presenter

Elmar Hörig (born 15 June 1949) is a German radio and television presenter.

== Life ==
Hörig was born in Baden-Baden, Germany. He studied Anglistics and PE. Until 1986, he worked as a teacher at the home school Lender in Sasbach amongst other things. From 1980 to 1999 he was a SWF3-presenter and on its successor station SWR3. He was known for his flippant humour, especially in the Elmi radio show, and for his own music compilation. At the same time he was listened to in and around Berlin with his broadcasts, radio puzzle, later renamed the radio-flip, at RIAS 2 and its successor rs2 and then with "All Bananas" ("Alles Banane") on Radio Fritz, where he often used elements, structures and ideas from his previous SWF3 broadcasts which he took over unchanged.

In 1999 his employment was terminated by the SWR because of jokes about the German federal railway carrier Deutsche Bundesbahn offering discounts for homosexual couples, that were interpreted as being homophobic. One such joke was "Warm weeks at the railway; they won't have to heat the trains from now on!" ("warm" has the connotation of "homosexual" in German), another was "So that's why they're asking you to cue from the rear at the ticket counter".

After leaving SWR3 Hörig was hired as a presenter in order to host his own show on Rockland Radio. Since 2004, he presented his show on Radio Regenbogen under its old name, with which he was successful in SWF3. The "new" Elmi radio show was first broadcast weekdays and since May 2006 every Saturday from 2 to 6 p.m. In addition, he hosted the show "Dinner for Elmi" Thursdays from 7 to 10 p.m. The collaboration with Radio Regenbogen was terminated in early April 2007.
