= 1798 in Germany =

- Decades: 1800s; 1810s
- See also: Other events of 1798; History of Germany • Timeline • Years

Events from the year 1798 in Germany.

== Incumbents ==
=== Holy Roman Empire ===
- Francis II (5 July 1792 – 6 August 1806)

==== Important Electors ====
- Bavaria- Charles I (30 December 1777 – 16 February 1799)
- Saxony- Frederick Augustus I (17 December 1763 – 20 December 1806)

=== Kingdoms ===
- Kingdom of Prussia
  - Monarch – Frederick William III (16 November 1797 – 7 June 1840)

=== Grand duchies ===
- Grand Duke of Mecklenburg-Schwerin
  - Frederick Francis I– (24 April 1785 – 1 February 1837)
- Grand Duke of Mecklenburg-Strelitz
  - Charles II (2 June 1794 – 6 November 1816)
- Grand Duke of Oldenburg
  - Wilhelm (6 July 1785 – 2 July 1823) Due to mental illness, Wilhelm was duke in name only, with his cousin Peter, Prince-Bishop of Lübeck, acting as regent throughout his entire reign.
  - Peter I (2 July 1823 – 21 May 1829)
- Grand Duke of Saxe-Weimar
  - Karl August (1758–1809) Raised to grand duchy in 1809

=== Principalities ===
- Schaumburg-Lippe
  - George William (13 February 1787 – 1860)
- Schwarzburg-Rudolstadt
  - Louis Frederick II (13 April 1793 – 28 April 1807)
- Schwarzburg-Sondershausen
  - Günther Friedrich Karl I (14 October 1794 – 19 August 1835)
- Principality of Reuss-Greiz
  - Heinrich XI, Prince Reuss of Greiz (12 May 1778 – 28 June 1800)
- Waldeck and Pyrmont
  - Friedrich Karl August (29 August 1763 – 24 September 1812)

=== Duchies ===
- Duke of Anhalt-Dessau
  - Leopold III (16 December 1751 – 9 August 1817)
- Duke of Saxe-Altenburg
  - Duke of Saxe-Hildburghausen (1780–1826) - Frederick
- Duke of Saxe-Coburg-Saalfeld
  - Ernest Frederick, Duke of Saxe-Coburg-Saalfeld (16 September 1764 – 8 September 1800)
- Duke of Saxe-Meiningen
  - Georg I (1782–1803)
- Duke of Schleswig-Holstein-Sonderburg-Beck
  - Frederick Charles Louis (24 February 1775 – 25 March 1816)
- Duke of Württemberg
  - Frederick I (22 December 1797 – 30 October 1816)

=== Other ===
- Landgrave of Hesse-Darmstadt
  - Louis I (6 April 1790 – 14 August 1806)

== Events ==
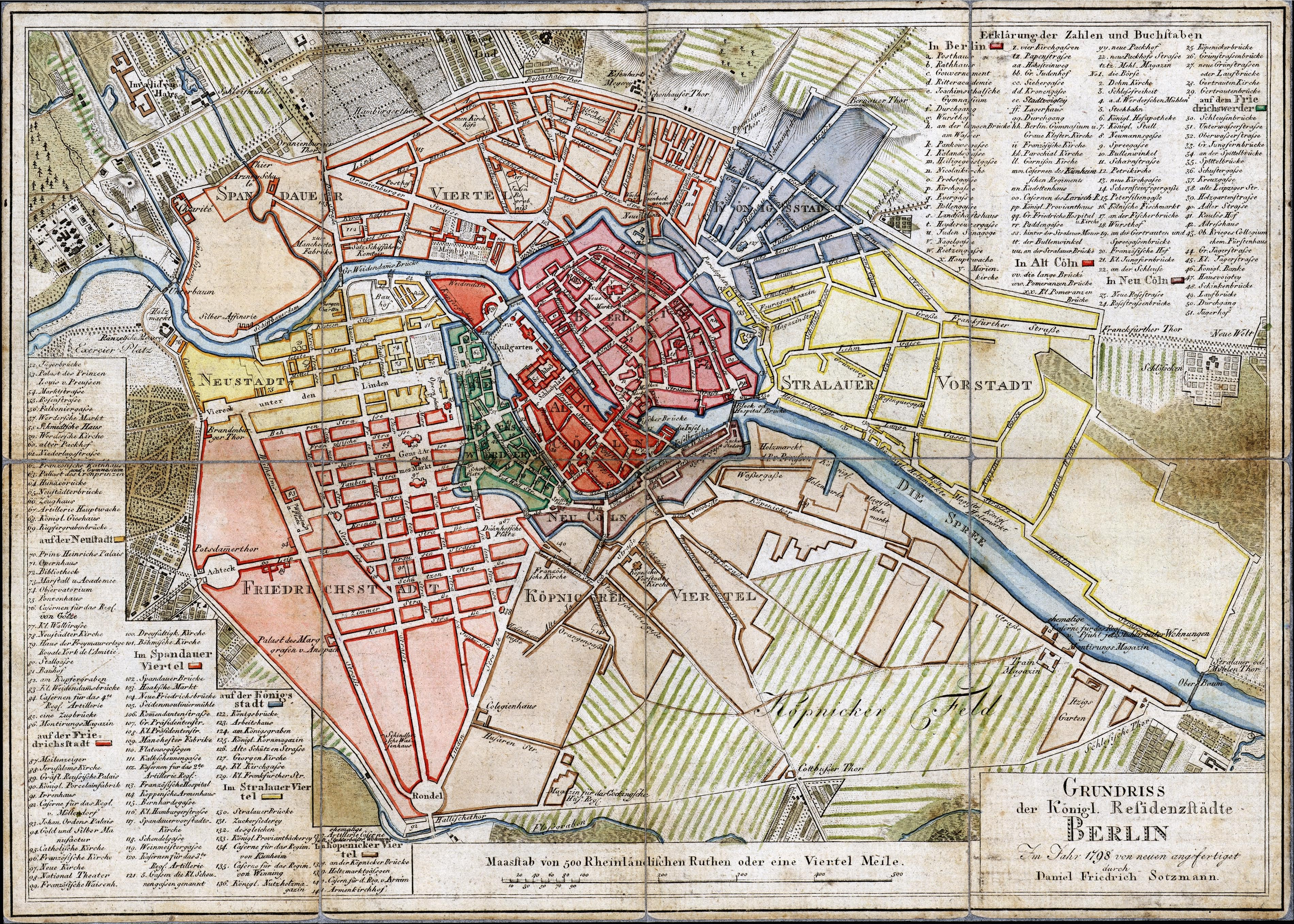
Berlin in 1798

- Building of the first major example of Egyptian Revival architecture, Karlsruhe Synagogue in Baden, designed by Friedrich Weinbrenner.
- Friedrich von Schiller – Wallensteins Lager
- 12 October – The rebuilt Weimarer Hoftheater are inaugurated with the first performance of the first part of Friedrich Schiller's dramatic trilogy Wallenstein: Das Lager (The Camp), directed by Goethe.
- Caroline von Wolzogen (anonymously) – Agnes von Lilien (first complete book publication, in 2 vols)
- Francis Lathom – The Midnight Bell: a German story, founded on incidents in real life
- Cassella chemical and pharmaceutical company founded
- M. M. Warburg & Co. bank founded

== Births ==
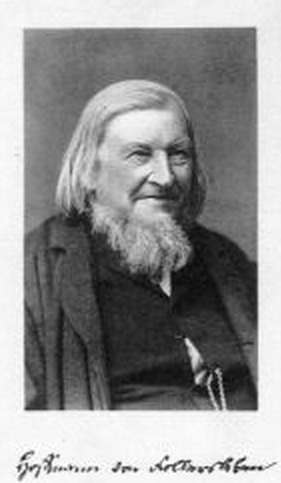
August Heinrich Hoffmann von Fallersleben

- 31 January – Christine Genast, actress, singer and pianist (d. 1860)
- 25 March – Christoph Gudermann, German mathematician (d. 1852)
- 30 March – Luise Hensel, German religious author and poet (died 1876)
- 2 April – August Heinrich Hoffmann von Fallersleben, German writer (d. 1874)
- 11 September – Franz Ernst Neumann, German mineralogist, physicist and mathematician (d. 1895)
- 17 December – Wilhelmine von Wrochem, flutist, singer and actress (d. 1839)

== Deaths ==
- 20 January – Christian Cannabich, German musician and composer (born 1731)
- 11 April – Karl Wilhelm Ramler, German poet (b. 1725)
- 29 April – Nikolaus Poda von Neuhaus, German entomologist (b. 1723)
- 25 May – Asmus Jacob Carstens, Danish-German (born 1754)
- 20 November – Friedrich Fleischmann, composer (born 1766)
