= Ferdinand Kürnberger =

Austrian writer (1821–1879)

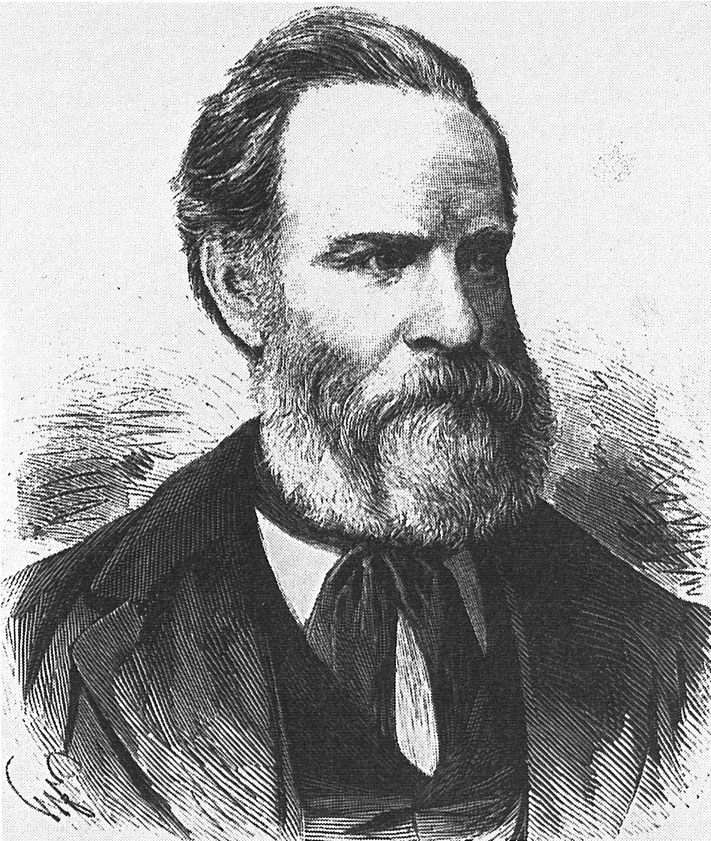
Ferdinand Kürnberger

Ferdinand Kürnberger (3 July 1821 – 14 October 1879) was an Austrian writer.

== Career ==
Born in Vienna, Kürnberger was one of the most influential writers of Viennese literature in the 1860s and 1870s. He is now known mainly for his participation in the revolution of 1848, which would oblige him to flee to Dresden, Germany where he was arrested the following year. In 1855, he published Der Amerika-Müde, amerikanisches Kulturbild, an anti-American polemical novel. He died in Munich, Germany.

== Works ==
- Geglaubt und vergessen (1836)
- Der Amerika-Müde, amerikanisches Kulturbild (1855)
- Ausgewählte Novellen (1858)
- Literarische Herzenssachen. Reflexionen und Kritiken (1877)
- Das Schloß der Frevel (1903)
