= 1867 in Germany =

- Decades: 1840s; 1850s; 1860s; 1870s; 1880s
- See also: Other events of 1867; History of Germany • Timeline • Years

The following events happened in Germany in the year 1867.

== Incumbents ==
- King of Bavaria – Ludwig II of Bavaria
- King of Prussia – William I
- King of Saxony – John

== Events ==
- February 12 - February 1867 North German federal election
- August 31 - August 1867 North German federal election
- Date unknown - Volume I of Das Kapital by Karl Marx was published in Hamburg by Verlag Otto Meisner
- Date unknown - Germanischer Lloyd was founded.

== Births ==
- January 10 - Gerhard Anschütz. German lawyer (died 1948)
- January 17 - Carl Laemmle, German-American film executive (died 1939)
- January 21 - Ludwig Thoma, German writer (died 1921)
- May 14 - Kurt Eisner, German journalist and theatre critic (died 1919)
- July 3 - Johannes Hoffmann, German SPD Minister-President of Bavaria (died 1930)
- July 8 - Käthe Kollwitz, German artist (died 1945)
- July 10 - Prince Maximilian of Baden, German nobleman and chancellor of Germany (died 1929)
- September 7 - Albert Bassermann, German actor (died 1952)
- September 9 - Ernst Oppler, German painter (died 1929)
- September 29 - Walther Rathenau, German statesman and politician (died 1929)
- October 20 - Ludwig Fahrenkrog, German writer and playwright (died 1952)

== Deaths ==
- January 12 - Georg Merz, German optician (born 1793)
- January 15 - Adolf Lohse, German architect (born 1807)
- February 3 - Prince Maximilian of Wied-Neuwied, German nobleman, explorer, ethnologist and naturalist (born 1783)
- February 27 - Christian Ernst Bernhard Morgenstern, German painter (born 1805)
- March 6 - Peter von Cornelius, German painter (born 1784)
- March 13 - Princess Louise Caroline of Hesse-Kassel, German noblewoman (born 1789)
- March 25 - Friedlieb Ferdinand Runge, German chemist (born 1794)
- April 12 - Johann Christian Friedrich Tuch, German Orientalist and theologian (born 1806)
- April 14 - Ferdinand August Maria Franz von Ritgen, German obstetrician and naturalist b (born 1787)
- May 25 - Johann Christian Bauer, German type designer and punchcutter (born 1802)
- June 11 - Karl Otto Weber, German surgeon (born 1827)
- June 16 - Paulus Modestus Schücking, German lawyer (born 1787)
- June 26 - Maximilian Anton, Hereditary Prince of Thurn and Taxis, German nobleman (born 1831)
- June 28 - Friedrich Günther, Prince of Schwarzburg-Rudolstadt, German nobleman (born 1793)
- July 26 - Otto of Greece, German king in Greece (born 1815)
- August 28 - Carl Joseph Anton Mittermaier, German jurist (born 1787)
- September 5 - Prince William of Hesse-Kassel, German nobleman (born 1787)
- October 23 - Franz Bopp, German linguist (born 1791)
- December 9 - Johann Nicolaus von Dreyse, German firearms inventor and manufacture (born 1787)
- December 17 - Carl Heinrich "Bipontinus" Schultz, German physician and botanist (born 1805)
- December 21 - Karl Friedrich Schimper, German botanist and naturalist (born 1803)
