= Carl Friedrich Alexander Hartmann =

German metallurgist

Carl Friedrich Alexander Hartmann (8 January 1796 – 3 August 1863) was a German mineralogist, geologist and a mining engineer who wrote several books on geology and mining. His knowledge of French and English allowed him to translate several works into German including Elements of Geology by Charles Lyell.

Hartmann was born in Zorge in the Harz mountains where his father worked in a foundry in the region known for its mining and smelting industry. With an early interest in metallurgy, he was educated at Zorge before going to Blankenburg studying under an uncle who was the abbott of Ziegenbein. He then went to study at the mining school in Clausthal. He was conscripted during the War of Liberation between 1813 and 1815 and after discharge in 1816 he became an assistant in a foundry at Zorge. He then made visits to foundries in Silesia and then to Berlin in 1818 where his studied under Christian Weiss and worked as an assistant. He worked after his marriage in 1821 as an accountant in Rübeland while privately studying geology. In 1823 he was made an honorary member of the Königlich Preussische Akademie Gemeinnütziger Wissenschaften of Erfurt. He was then sponsored to make a scientific visit to Italy after which he received a doctorate in jurisprudence from the University of Heidelberg in 1826. In 1829 he was appointed commissioner of mines in Brunswick. In 1834 he visited England and France. He resigned as commissioner in 1841 and began to write on mining. He represented the mining industry at the Berlin international exhibition of 1844. He authored some 12 monographs and translated approximately 40 French and English works into German. In 1841 he founded a periodical called the Berg-und hüttenmännische Zeitung and later as the Allgemeine berg-und hüttenmännische Zeitung. Although very little of Hartmann's works were original, he synthesized and translated from contemporary literature in English and French in his writings.
