= Peter van Bohlen =

German Orientalist and Indologist

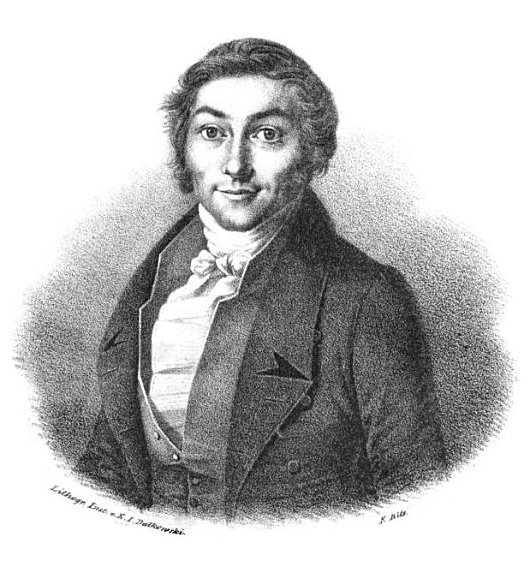
Peter von Bohlen

Peter von Bohlen (9 March 1796 – 6 February 1840) was a German Orientalist and Indologist. He was a professor at the University of Königsberg.

He spent the first 20 years of his life in strained circumstances. His talents and perseverance attracted attention, and he obtained admission to the Hamburg gymnasium. He afterward studied the Eastern languages at Halle and Bonn. He then obtained an appointment at Königsberg, first in 1825 as extraordinary, and afterward in 1830 as ordinary professor of oriental literature.

== Works ==
Bohlen has left many works which fully support his title to the high place which he held among Oriental scholars. One of his most important works is entitled Das alte Indien (Old India, 2 vols., 1830–31). Other publications of his are Die Genesis historisch-kritisch erläutert (Genesis explained critically and historically, 1835) and Latin translations of Bhartrihari's Śatakatraya (1833) and Kalidasa's Ritusamhara (1840). The details of Bohlen's life are given with great minuteness and honesty in his Autobiography (Königsberg, 1841), which is full of interest, and cannot be read without producing a full conviction that he was no less distinguished by his amiability in private life than by his literary acquirements.
