= 1797 in Germany =

- Decades: 1800s; 1810s
- See also: Other events of 1797; History of Germany • Timeline • Years

Events from the year 1797 in Germany.

== Incumbents ==
=== Holy Roman Empire ===
- Francis II (5 July 1792 – 6 August 1806)

==== Important Electors ====
- Bavaria- Charles I (30 December 1777 – 16 February 1799)
- Saxony- Frederick Augustus I (17 December 1763 – 20 December 1806)

=== Kingdoms ===
- Kingdom of Prussia
  - Monarch –
    - Frederick William II (17 August 1786 – 16 November 1797)
    - Frederick William III (16 November 1797 – 7 June 1840)

=== Grand Duchies ===
- Grand Duke of Mecklenburg-Schwerin
  - Frederick Francis I– (24 April 1785 – 1 February 1837)
- Grand Duke of Mecklenburg-Strelitz
  - Charles II (2 June 1794 – 6 November 1816)
- Grand Duke of Oldenburg
  - Wilhelm (6 July 1785 – 2 July 1823) Due to mental illness, Wilhelm was duke in name only, with his cousin Peter, Prince-Bishop of Lübeck, acting as regent throughout his entire reign.
  - Peter I (2 July 1823 – 21 May 1829)
- Grand Duke of Saxe-Weimar
  - Karl August (1758–1809) Raised to grand duchy in 1809

=== Principalities ===
- Schaumburg-Lippe
  - George William (13 February 1787 – 1860)
- Schwarzburg-Rudolstadt
  - Louis Frederick II (13 April 1793 – 28 April 1807)
- Schwarzburg-Sondershausen
  - Günther Friedrich Karl I (14 October 1794 – 19 August 1835)
- Principality of Reuss-Greiz
  - Heinrich XI, Prince Reuss of Greiz (12 May 1778-28 June 1800)
- Waldeck and Pyrmont
  - Friedrich Karl August (29 August 1763 – 24 September 1812)

=== Duchies ===
- Duke of Anhalt-Dessau
  - Leopold III (16 December 1751 – 9 August 1817)
- Duke of Saxe-Altenburg
  - Duke of Saxe-Hildburghausen (1780–1826) - Frederick
- Duke of Saxe-Coburg-Saalfeld
  - Ernest Frederick, Duke of Saxe-Coburg-Saalfeld (16 September 1764 – 8 September 1800)
- Duke of Saxe-Meiningen
  - Georg I (1782–1803)
- Duke of Schleswig-Holstein-Sonderburg-Beck
  - Frederick Charles Louis (24 February 1775 – 25 March 1816)
- Duke of Württemberg
  - Frederick II Eugene, Duke of Württemberg (20 May 1795 – 23 December 1797)
  - Frederick I (22 December 1797 – 30 October 1816)

=== Other ===
- Landgrave of Hesse-Darmstadt
  - Louis I (6 April 1790 – 14 August 1806)

== Events ==
- 26 January – The Treaty of the Third Partition of Poland is signed in St. Petersburg by the Russian Empire, Austria and the Kingdom of Prussia.
- 12 February – "Gott erhalte Franz den Kaiser" is first performed, with the music composed in January by Joseph Haydn, which also becomes the tune to the Deutschlandlied, the German national anthem (Deutschland, Deutschland über alles, later Einigkeit und Recht und Freiheit).
- 16 November – The Prussian heir apparent, Frederick William, becomes King of Prussia as Fredrick William III.

== Births ==
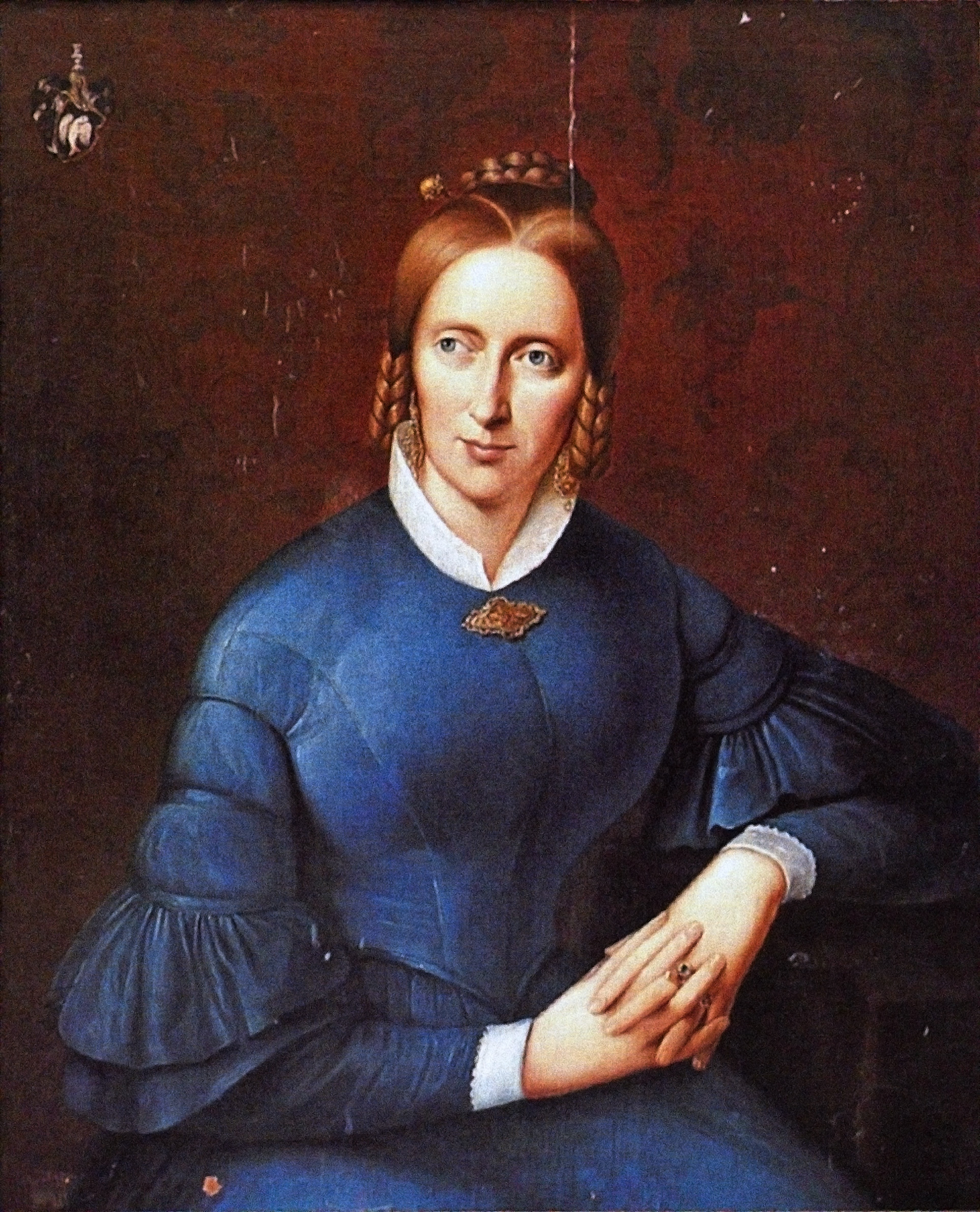
Annette von Droste-Hülshoff

- 4 January – Wilhelm Beer, German banker, astronomer (d. 1850)
- 5 January – Eduard Vogel von Falckenstein, Prussian general (d. 1885)
- 10 January – Annette von Droste-Hülshoff, German writer (d. 1848)
- 11 January – Carl Rottmann, German landscape painter, the most famous member of the Rottmann family of painters (d. 1850)
- 26 January – Therese Albertine Luise Robinson, German-American author (d. 1870)
- 29 January – Prince Adolf zu Hohenlohe-Ingelfingen, Prussian nobleman (d. 1873)
- 2 February – Bertha Zück, German-born treasurer of Queen Josephine of Sweden (d. 1868)
- 6 February – Joseph von Radowitz, conservative Prussian statesman, general (d. 1853)
- 15 February – Henry Engelhard Steinway, German-American piano manufacturer (d. 1871)
- 23 February – Heinrich Halfeld, German engineer (d. 1873)
- 3 March – Gotthilf Hagen, German civil engineer who made important contributions to fluid dynamics (d. 1884)
- 5 March – Friedrich von Gerolt, Prussian Privy Councillor, Envoy Extraordinary and Minister Plenipotentiary in the United States (d. 1879)
- 21 March – Johann Andreas Wagner, German palaeontologist (d. 1861)
- 22 March
  - Eduard Gans, German jurist (d. 1839)
  - Emperor Wilhelm I of Germany (d. 1888)
- 27 March – Heinrich LXXII, Prince Reuss of Lobenstein and Ebersdorf (d. 1853)
- 5 April – Karl August Devrient, German stage actor best known for performances of Schiller and Shakespeare (d. 1872)
- 12 April – Ernst August Hagen, Prussian art writer, novelist (d. 1880)
- 23 April – Ernst Ferdinand Oehme, German Romantic painter, illustrator (d. 1855)
- 26 April – Albert Seerig, German surgeon, anatomist (d. 1862)
- 3 May – Heinrich Berghaus, German geographer (d. 1884)
- 11 May – Ernst Meyer, German-born Danish genre painter of Jewish ancestry (d. 1861)
- 12 May – Johann Hermann Kufferath, German composer (d. 1864)
- 18 May – Frederick Augustus II of Saxony (d. 1854)
- 30 May
  - Johann Christian Lobe, German composer, music theorist (d. 1881)
  - Georg Amadeus Carl Friedrich Naumann, German mineralogist (d. 1873)
- 20 June – Karolina Gerhardinger, German Roman Catholic professed religious, established the School Sisters of Notre Dame (d. 1879)
- 12 July – Adele Schopenhauer, German author (d. 1849)
- 20 July – Gotthard Fritzsche, Prussian-Australian pastor (d. 1863)
- 25 July – Princess Augusta of Hesse-Kassel (d. 1889)
- 5 August – Friedrich August Kummer, German violoncellist, pedagogue and composer (d. 1879)
- 6 August – August Wilhelm Stiehler, German government official, paleobotanist (d. 1878)
- 7 August – Justin von Linde, German jurist, statesman from the Grand Duchy of Hesse (d. 1870)
- 9 August – Christian Wilhelm Niedner, German church historian, theologian (d. 1865)
- 10 August – Joseph Gerhard Zuccarini, German botanist (d. 1848)
- 28 August – Karl Otfried Müller, German scholar, Philodorian (d. 1840)
- 10 September – Franz Krüger, German (Prussian) painter, lithographer (d. 1857)
- 16 September – Johann Friedrich Ludwig Wöhlert, German businessman (d. 1877)
- 17 September – Heinrich Kuhl, German naturalist, zoologist (d. 1821)
- 24 September – Carl Peter Wilhelm Gramberg, German theologian, biblical scholar (d. 1830)

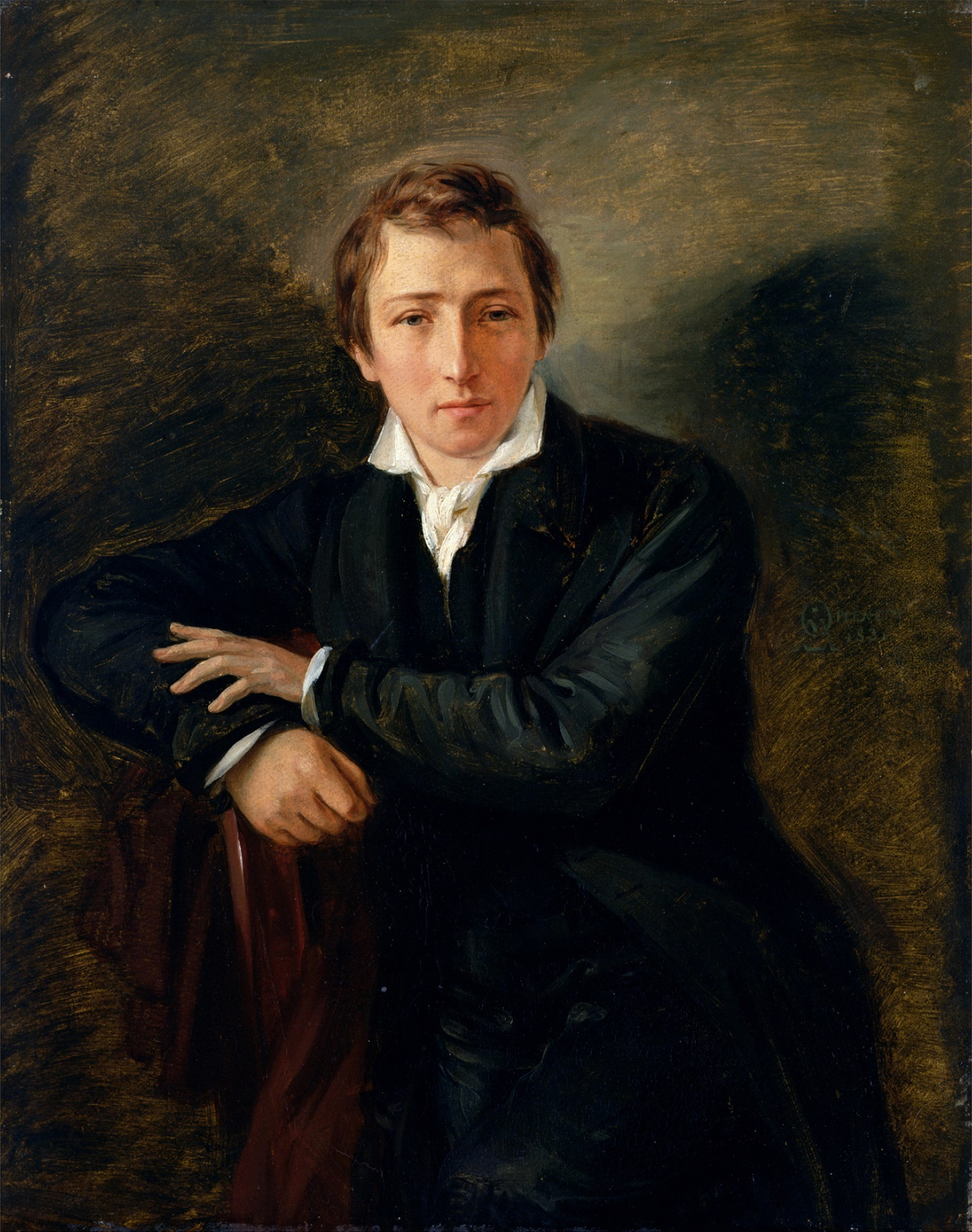
Heinrich Heine

- 3 October – Ludwig Förster, German-born Austrian architect (d. 1863)
- 10 October – - August Heinrich Hermann von Dönhoff, Prussian diplomat (d. 1874)
- 15 October
  - Johann Gottlieb Fleischer, German botanist and ornithologist (d. 1838)
  - Karl Wilhelm Ludwig Heyse, German philologist (d. 1855)
- 26 October – Johann Adam Philipp Hepp, German physician, lichenologist (d. 1867)
- 30 October – Princess Henrietta of Nassau-Weilburg (d. 1829)
- 14 November
  - Moses M. Haarbleicher, German-Jewish poet, critic (d. 1869)
  - Justus Radius, German pathologist, ophthalmologist (d. 1884)
- 13 December – Heinrich Heine, German poet (d. 1856)
- 14 December – Emil Huschke, German anatomist and embryologist (d. 1858)
- 15 December – Karl Friedrich Theodor Krause, German anatomist (d. 1868)
- 18 December – August Friedrich Wilhelm Forchhammer, jurist and historian from the Duchy of Schleswig (d. 1870)
- 26 December – Johann Gustav Heckscher, German politician (d. 1865)

== Deaths ==
- 13 January – Elisabeth Christine of Brunswick-Wolfenbüttel-Bevern, queen consort of Prussia (b. 1715)
- 22 February – Karl Friedrich Hieronymus Freiherr von Münchhausen, German officer and adventurer (b. 1720)
- 7 March – Johann Heinrich Samuel Formey, German writer (b. 1711)
- 12 April – Johann Georg Bach, German organist (b. 1751)
- 12 August – Gotthelf Greiner, glassmaker (born 1732)
- 4 October – Johann Christian Georg Bodenschatz, German Protestant theologian (born 1717)
- 6 October – Johann Matthäus Hassencamp, German Orientalist and theologian (born 1743)
- 16 November – King Frederick William II of Prussia (b. 1744)
- 27 November – Johann Baptist Wendling, Alsatian-born flute player, composer of the Mannheim School (b. 1723)
- 23 December – Frederick II Eugene, Duke of Württemberg (b. 1732)
