= 1799 in Germany =

- Decades: 1800s; 1810s
- See also: Other events of 1799; History of Germany • Timeline • Years

Events from the year 1799 in Germany.

== Incumbents ==
=== Holy Roman Empire ===
- Francis II (5 July 1792 – 6 August 1806)

==== Important Electors ====
- Bavaria- Charles I (30 December 1777 – 16 February 1799)
- Saxony- Frederick Augustus I (17 December 1763 – 20 December 1806)

=== Kingdoms ===
- Kingdom of Prussia
  - Monarch – Frederick William III (16 November 1797 – 7 June 1840)

=== Grand Duchies ===
- Grand Duke of Mecklenburg-Schwerin
  - Frederick Francis I– (24 April 1785 – 1 February 1837)
- Grand Duke of Mecklenburg-Strelitz
  - Charles II (2 June 1794 – 6 November 1816)
- Grand Duke of Oldenburg
  - Wilhelm (6 July 1785 – 2 July 1823) Due to mental illness, Wilhelm was duke in name only, with his cousin Peter, Prince-Bishop of Lübeck, acting as regent throughout his entire reign.
  - Peter I (2 July 1823 – 21 May 1829)
- Grand Duke of Saxe-Weimar
  - Karl August (1758–1809) Raised to grand duchy in 1809

=== Principalities ===
- Schaumburg-Lippe
  - George William (13 February 1787 – 1860)
- Schwarzburg-Rudolstadt
  - Louis Frederick II (13 April 1793 – 28 April 1807)
- Schwarzburg-Sondershausen
  - Günther Friedrich Karl I (14 October 1794 – 19 August 1835)
- Principality of Reuss-Greiz
  - Heinrich XI, Prince Reuss of Greiz (12 May 1778-28 June 1800)
- Waldeck and Pyrmont
  - Friedrich Karl August (29 August 1763 – 24 September 1812)

=== Duchies ===
- Duke of Anhalt-Dessau
  - Leopold III (16 December 1751 – 9 August 1817)
- Duke of Saxe-Altenburg
  - Duke of Saxe-Hildburghausen (1780–1826) - Frederick
- Duke of Saxe-Coburg-Saalfeld
  - Ernest Frederick, Duke of Saxe-Coburg-Saalfeld (16 September 1764 – 8 September 1800)
- Duke of Saxe-Meiningen
  - Georg I (1782–1803)
- Duke of Schleswig-Holstein-Sonderburg-Beck
  - Frederick Charles Louis (24 February 1775 – 25 March 1816)
- Duke of Württemberg
  - Frederick I (22 December 1797 – 30 October 1816)

=== Other ===
- Landgrave of Hesse-Darmstadt
  - Louis I (6 April 1790 – 14 August 1806)

== Events ==
- December 3 – War of the Second Coalition: Battle of Wiesloch: Austrian Lieutenant Field Marshal Anton Sztáray defeats the French at Wiesloch.
- Frankenthal Porcelain Factory closed by the French forces.

== Births ==
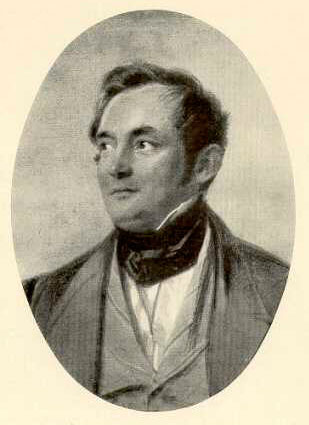
Carl Adolph von Basedow

- January 7 – Eduard Magnus, German painter (died 1872)
- May 26 – August Kopisch, German poet and painter (died 1853)
- March 22 – Friedrich Wilhelm Argelander, German astronomer (d. 1875)
- March 28 – Karl Adolph von Basedow, German physician, noted for reporting the symptoms of Graves–Basedow disease (d. 1854)
- October 18 – Christian Friedrich Schönbein, German chemist (d. 1868)
- Eduard Clemens Fechner, German portrait painter and etcher (died 1861)

== Deaths ==
- February 1 – Ferdinand Kobell, German painter and engraver (born 1740)
- February 16 – Charles Theodore, Elector of Bavaria (b. 1724)
- February 18 – Johann Hedwig, German bryologist (born 1730)
- February 24 – Georg Christoph Lichtenberg, German scientist, satirist, and Anglophile (b. 1742)
- March 18 – Adam Friedrich Oeser, German etcher, painter and sculptor (born 1717)
- March 29 – Helena Dorothea von Schönberg, German industrialist (d. 1729)
