= Karl Friedrich Vollrath Hoffmann =

German geographer (1796–1842)

Karl Friedrich Vollrath Hoffmann (15 July 1796, in Stargard – 30 August 1842, in Stuttgart) was a German geographer.

He studied at the Friedrich Wilhelm University of Berlin, and afterwards taught classes in Philipp Emanuel von Fellenberg's institute (Hofwyl College). Later on, he was named director of Cotta's geographical institute at the University of Stuttgart. In 1829, he obtained his habilitation and served as a lecturer at the Ludwig-Maximilians-Universität München. Due to outspoken remarks regarding Catholicism, he lost his position at the Ludwig-Maximilians-Universität München and subsequently returned to Stuttgart.

With Alexander von Humboldt and Heinrich Berghaus, he was editor of the geographical journal "Annalen der erd, völker- und staatenkunde". Hoffmann, an “energetically active pedagogical nature”, is one of the important popularizers of geography in the 19th century in Germany. He also emerged as a critic of the Christian mission, denouncing its “ill-considered conversion fury” overseas.

== Selected works ==
- Ueber die Zerstörung der Römerstädte am Rhein zwischen Lahn und Wied, (2nd edition, 1823) – On the destruction of the Roman cities on the Rhine between Lahn and Wied.
- Umrisse zur Erd- und Staatenkunde vom Lande der Deutschen, (1823).
- Deutschland und seine Bewohner: Ein Handbuch der Vaterlandskunde für alle Stände, (1834–36, 4 volumes) – Germany and its inhabitants.
- Die Erde und ihre Bewohner: Ein Hand- und Lesebuch für alle Stände, (4th edition, 1835) – The Earth and its inhabitants.
- Europa und seine Bewohner: Ein Hand- und Lesebuch für alle Stände, (1835–40, 8 volumes) – Europe and its inhabitants.
- Die Völker der Erde, ihr Leben, ihre Sitten und Gebräuche, (1840, 2 volumes) – The peoples of the world, their lives, their manners and customs.
- Hertha, Einleitung in die Erdkunde, (1840–41, 2 volumes) – "Hertha", introduction to geography.
