= Christian Lorenz Sommer =

German classical philologist

Christian Lorenz Sommer (19 November 1796 in Rudolstadt – 20 July 1846 in Rudolstadt) was a German classical philologist and educator.

From 1814 he studied theology and philology at the University of Göttingen, and beginning in 1816, he studied philology at the University of Leipzig, where his instructors were Gottfried Hermann and Christian Daniel Beck. In 1817 he began service as a "collaborator" at the Landesschule Pforta under the rectorship of Karl David Ilgen. From 1819 onward, he was a professor at the Rudolstadt gymnasium. In 1832 he was awarded with an honorary degree from the University of Jena.

He was the author of scholarly editions of Plato's Symposium (1820), Xenophon's Anabasis (1821) and of the "Library of Apollodorus" (1822). He also published four treatises pertaining to the Hecuba of Euripides (1836–44).
