= Moritz Wilhelm August Breidenbach =

German jurist (1796–1857)

Moritz Wilhelm August Breidenbach (13 November 1796 – 2 April 1857) was a German jurist.

== Life ==
Breidenbach was born at Offenbach as a son of Wolf Breidenbach. After his secondary education at a gymnasium at Frankfurt, he studied law at the University of Heidelberg, from which he was graduated in 1817 as a Doctor of Law.

After a supplementary course at Göttingen, where he was listed as a Jewish law student he began the practise of law at Darmstadt in 1820. He converted to Protestantism at a time when many thousands of German Jews converted because they wanted to enter civil service.

In 1831 he became counselor of the treasury in the Ministry of the Interior of Hesse-Darmstadt, and in 1836 counselor of the cabinet, in which capacity he officiated as commissioner of the Hessian government in the Landtag. He became a member of the council of state in 1848, but was compelled to resign this office upon the outbreak of the Revolution. He was recalled, however, in 1849 as chief counselor for education, which position he held until his death.

Breidenbach died in Darmstadt.

== Legacy ==
According to the 1906 Jewish Encyclopedia:

Breidenbach displayed exceptional ability in every capacity, whether as a jurist, official, or popular representative. But he was frequently opposed by those who admired his learning, because of his pronounced monarchical views. He was the principal author of the penal code of Hesse, and actively participated in framing the "Allgemeine Deutsche Wechsel- und Handelsrecht." His principal literary work is his commentary on the Hessian legal code.
