= 1800 in Germany =

- Decades: 1800s; 1810s; 1820s
- See also: Other events of 1800; History of Germany • Timeline • Years

Events from the year 1800 in Germany.

== Incumbents ==
=== Holy Roman Empire ===
- Francis II (5 July 1792 – 6 August 1806)

==== Important Electors ====
- Bavaria – Maximilian I (16 February 1799 – 6 August 1806)
- Saxony – Frederick Augustus I (17 December 1763 – 20 December 1806)

=== Kingdoms ===
- Kingdom of Prussia
  - Monarch – Frederick William III (16 November 1797 – 7 June 1840)

=== Grand Duchies ===
- Grand Duke of Mecklenburg-Schwerin
  - Frederick Francis I– (24 April 1785 – 1 February 1837)
- Grand Duke of Mecklenburg-Strelitz
  - Charles II (2 June 1794 – 6 November 1816)
- Grand Duke of Oldenburg
  - Wilhelm (6 July 1785 – 2 July 1823) Wilhelm, who suffered from mental illness, was duke in name only, with his cousin Peter, Prince-Bishop of Lübeck, acting as regent throughout his entire reign.
  - Peter I (2 July 1823 – 21 May 1829)
- Grand Duke of Saxe-Weimar
  - Karl August (1758–1809) Raised to grand duchy in 1809

=== Principalities ===
- Schaumburg-Lippe
  - George William (13 February 1787 – 1860)
- Schwarzburg-Rudolstadt
  - Louis Frederick II (13 April 1793 – 28 April 1807)
- Schwarzburg-Sondershausen
  - Günther Friedrich Karl I (14 October 1794 – 19 August 1835)
- Principality of Reuss-Greiz
  - Heinrich XIII (28 June 1800 – 29 January 1817)
- Waldeck and Pyrmont
  - Friedrich Karl August (29 August 1763 – 24 September 1812)

=== Duchies ===
- Duke of Anhalt-Dessau
  - Leopold III (16 December 1751 – 9 August 1817)
- Duke of Saxe-Altenburg
  - Duke of Saxe-Hildburghausen (1780–1826) – Frederick
- Duke of Saxe-Coburg-Saalfeld
  - Francis (8 September 1800 – 9 December 1806)
- Duke of Saxe-Meiningen
  - Georg I (1782–1803)
- Duke of Schleswig-Holstein-Sonderburg-Beck
  - Frederick Charles Louis (24 February 1775 – 25 March 1816)
- Duke of Württemberg
  - Frederick I (22 December 1797 – 30 October 1816)

=== Other ===
- Landgrave of Hesse-Darmstadt
  - Louis I (6 April 1790 – 14 August 1806)

== Events ==
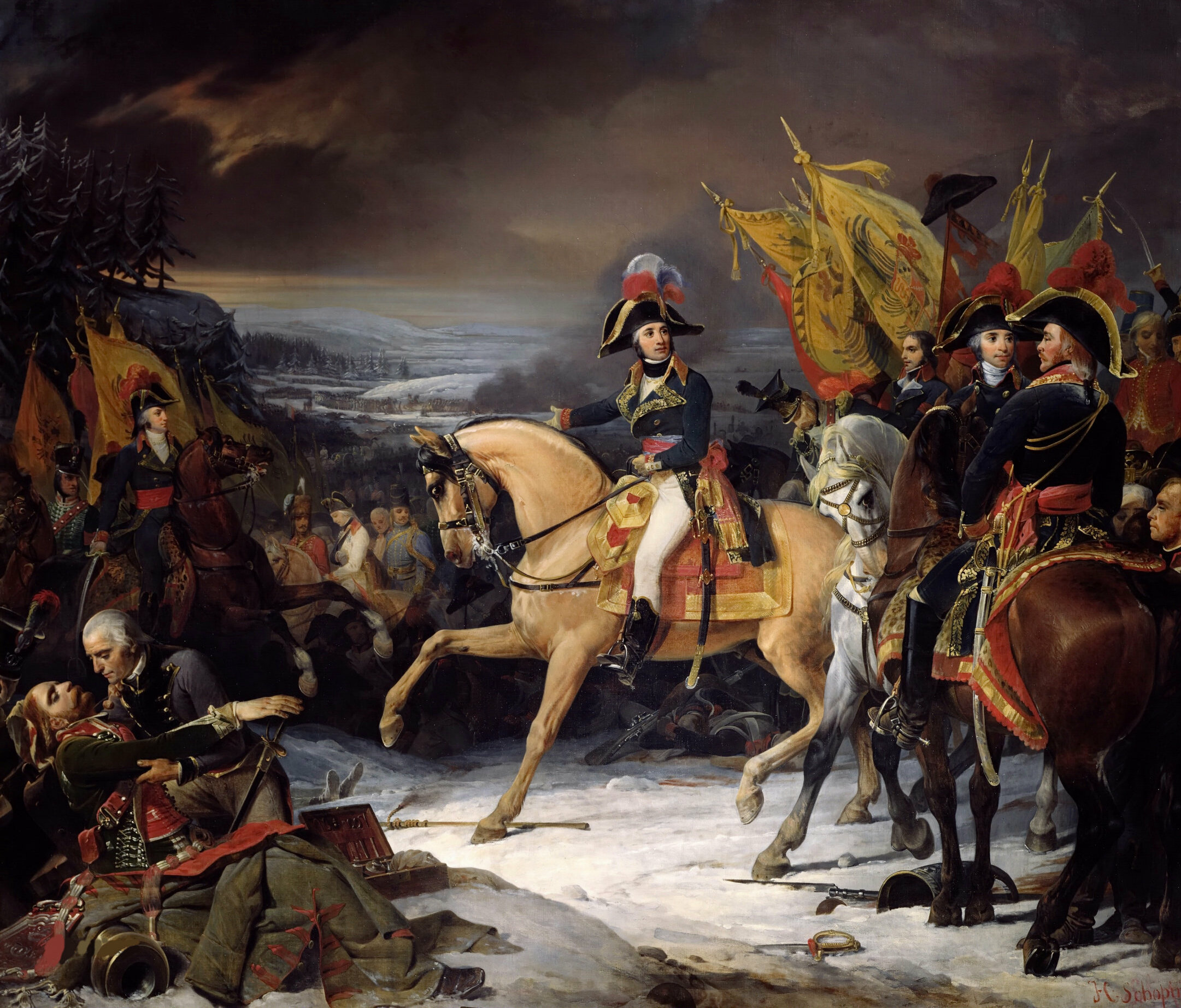
December 3: Battle of Hohenlinden.

- 2 April – Ludwig van Beethoven's Symphony No. 1 premieres at the Burgtheater, in Vienna.
- May 3
  - Battle of Stockach: French victory
  - Battle of Engen: French victory
- 4–5 May– Battle of Messkirch: French victory
- 9 May – Battle of Biberach: French victory
- 15 May – Battle of Erbach: French victory
- 19 June – War of the Second Coalition: Battle of Höchstädt – General Jean Victor Marie Moreau leads French forces to victory, opening the Danube passageway to Vienna.
- 27 June – Battle of Neuburg: French victory
- 22 November – War of the Second Coalition: Hostilities resume.
- 1 December – Battle of Ampfing
- 3 December – War of the Second Coalition: Battle of Hohenlinden – The French army defeats Habsburg and Bavarian troops.

== Births ==
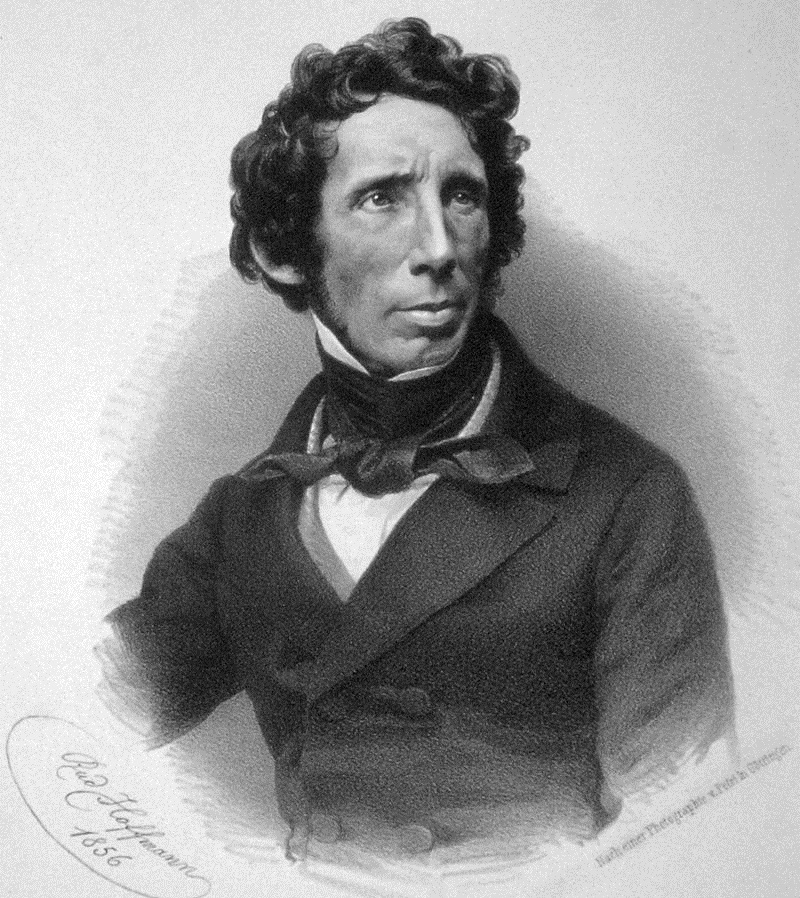
Friedrich Wöhler

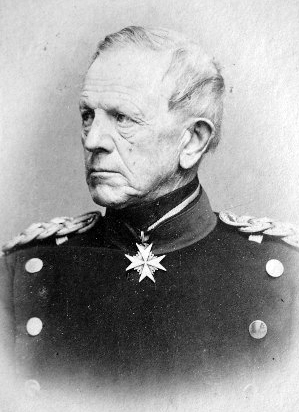
Helmuth von Moltke the Elder

- 26 January – Johann Gerhard Oncken, German Baptist preacher (died 1884)
- 3 March – Heinrich Georg Bronn, German geologist, paleontologist (died 1862)
- 10 March – Victor Aimé Huber, German social reformer (died 1869)
- 17 March – Rudolf Ewald Stier, German Protestant churchman, mystic (died 1862)
- 20 March – Gottfried Bernhardy, German philologist, literary historian (died 1875)
- 25 March – Ernst Heinrich Karl von Dechen, German geologist, mineralogist (died 1889)
- 28 March – Johann Georg Wagler, German herpetologist (died 1832)
- 16 April – Jakob Heine, German orthopaedist (died 1879)
- 30 May – Karl Wilhelm Feuerbach, German geometer (died 1834)
- 31 July – Friedrich Wöhler, German chemist (died 1882)
- 20 August – Bernhard Heine, German physician, bone specialist and inventor (died 1846)
- 26 October – Helmuth von Moltke the Elder, German Field Marshal (died 1891)

=== Approximate date ===
- Abraham Rice, German-born rabbi, first ordained rabbi to serve in the United States (died 1862)

== Deaths ==
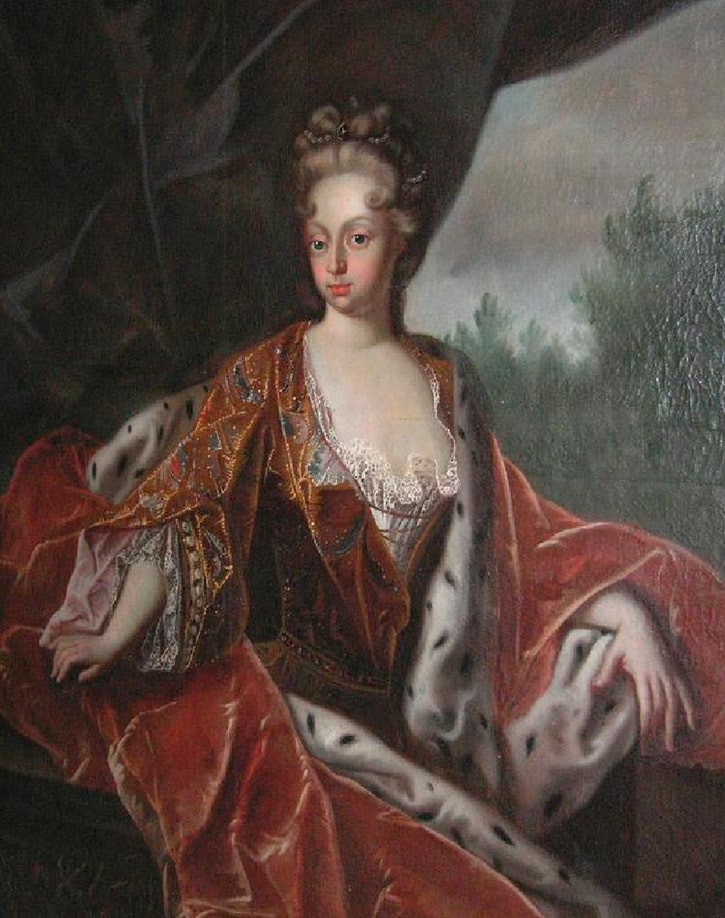
Charlotte Sophie of Aldenburg

- 3 January – Count Karl-Wilhelm Finck von Finckenstein, Prime Minister of Prussia (born 1714)
- 6 January – Friedrich Adolf Riedesel, German soldier (born 1738)
- 11 January – Kyra Frosini, Greek heroine (born 1773)
- 16 January – Johann Christian Wiegleb, German chemist (born 1732)
- 4 February – Charlotte Sophie of Aldenburg, Countess of Varel and Kniphausen (born 1715)
- 20 June – Abraham Gotthelf Kästner, German mathematician (born 1719)
- 28 June – Heinrich XI, Prince Reuss of Greiz, German noble (born 1722)
- 10 September – Johann David Schoepff, German naturalist, doctor (born 1752)
- 4 October – Johann Hermann, German physician, naturalist (born 1738)
