= 1870 in Germany =

- Decades: 1850s; 1860s; 1870s; 1880s; 1890s
- See also: Other events of 1870; History of Germany • Timeline • Years

Events from the year 1870 in Germany.

== Incumbents ==
=== Kingdoms ===
- King of Bavaria – Ludwig II
- King of Prussia – William I
- King of Saxony – John
- King of Württemberg – Charles

=== Grand Duchies ===
- Grand Duke of Baden – Frederick I
- Grand Duke of Hesse – Louis III
- Grand Duke of Mecklenburg-Schwerin – Frederick Francis II
- Grand Duke of Mecklenburg-Strelitz – Frederick William
- Grand Duke of Oldenburg – Peter II
- Grand Duke of Saxe-Weimar-Eisenach – Charles Alexander

=== Principalities ===
- Schaumburg-Lippe – Adolf I, Prince of Schaumburg-Lippe
- Schwarzburg-Rudolstadt – George Albert, Prince of Schwarzburg-Rudolstadt
- Schwarzburg-Sondershausen – Günther Friedrich Karl II, Prince of Schwarzburg-Sondershausen
- Principality of Lippe – Leopold III, Prince of Lippe
- Reuss Elder Line – Heinrich XXII, Prince Reuss of Greiz
- Reuss Younger Line – Heinrich XIV, Prince Reuss Younger Line
- Waldeck and Pyrmont – George Victor, Prince of Waldeck and Pyrmont

=== Duchies ===
- Duke of Anhalt – Frederick I, Duke of Anhalt
- Duke of Brunswick – William, Duke of Brunswick
- Duke of Saxe-Altenburg – Ernst I, Duke of Saxe-Altenburg
- Duke of Saxe-Coburg and Gotha – Ernest II, Duke of Saxe-Coburg and Gotha
- Duke of Saxe-Meiningen – Georg II, Duke of Saxe-Meiningen

== Events ==
- 26 February – German company Commerzbank is founded in Hamburg.
- 10 March – The Deutsche Bank is granted a banking licence by the Prussian government.
- 16 July – In response to Bismarck's refusal to cede parts of the Rhineland to Emperor Napoleon III of France, the near succession of a Hohenzollern to the Spanish throne, and the Ems telegram, France declares war on Prussia, beginning the Franco-Prussian War.
- 19 July – Beginning of Franco-Prussian War
- 4 August – Battle of Wissembourg: The first battle of the Franco-Prussian War begins when three Prussian-led German army corps surprise and get the better of the small French garrison of Wissembourg. Despite being heavily outnumbered, the French defenders fiercely resist and inflict three times their number in casualties.
- 6 August – Battle of Spicheren – Karl Friedrich von Steinmetz soundly defeats a French army of 21,000, further driving the French towards the fortress city of Metz.
- 6 August – Battle of Wörth
- 6 August – Battle of Spicheren
- 15 August – 28 September – Siege of Strasbourg
- 19 August – 27 October – Siege of Metz
- 1 September – 2 September – Battle of Sedan. The Prussian Army captures the French emperor Napoleon III and 103,000 French troops, effectively deciding the war in Prussia's favor.
- 10 December – The Reichstag of the North German Confederation renames the Confederation the "North German Confederation of the German Empire".

=== Science ===
- Rudolf Clausius proves the scalar virial theorem.
- Ludimar Hermann observes the Hermann grid illusion.

== Births ==
- 1 January – Hermann Theodor Simon, German physicist (died 1918)
- 2 January – Ernst Barlach, German sculptor and writer (died 1938)
- 6 January – Gustav Bauer, German politician, Chancellor of Germany (died 1944)
- 10 January – Hans von Raumer, German politician (died 1965)
- 10 February – Fritz Klimsch, German sculptor (died 1960)
- 11 February – Bill Drews, German lawyer (died 1938)
- 12 February – Hugo Stinnes, German entrepreneur (died 1924)
- 21 March – Heinrich Waentig, German politician (died 1943)
- 9 May – Hans Baluschek, German painter (died 1935)
- 14 June – Sophia of Prussia, Prussian princess (died 1970)
- 21 June – Clara Immerwahr, German chemist (died 1915)
- 7 July – Joseph Koeth, German politician (died 1936)
- 27 July – Siegfried von Roedern, German politician (died 1954)
- 2 October – Joannes Baptista Sproll, German bishop of Roman-Catholic Church (died 1949)

== Deaths ==
- 15 February – Karl von Strotha, Prussian officer and Minister of War from 1848 to 1850 (born 1786)
- 3 April – Philipp Jaffé, German historian and philologist (born 1819)
- 4 April – Heinrich Gustav Magnus, German scientist (born 1802)
- 9 May – Prince Frederick of Württemberg, German nobleman and general in kingdom of Württemberg (born 1808)
- 12 May – Hermann von Beckerath, German banker and statesman (born 1801)
- 1 September – Joseph Anton von Maffei, German industrialist (born 1790)
- 14 September – Carl August von Steinheil, German physicist, inventor, engineer and astronomer (born 1801)
- 14 October – Karl Twesten, German politician and writer (born 1820)
- 19 December – Lebrecht Blücher Dreves, German poet (born 1816)
