= 1952 in Germany =

- Decades: 1930s; 1940s; 1950s; 1960s; 1970s
- See also: Other events of 1952; History of Germany • Timeline • Years

Events in the year 1952 in Germany.

== Incumbents ==
- President – Theodor Heuss
- Chancellor – Konrad Adenauer

== Events ==
- Liquidation of German company IG Farben started.
- 25 April - The three states of Württemberg-Baden, Württemberg-Hohenzollern and South Baden merge to form the modern southwestern state of Baden-Württemberg.
- 26 May - Porsche Club Hohensyburg is founded.
- 12 to 25 June - 2nd Berlin International Film Festival
- 24 June: German newspaper BILD was founded.

== Births ==
- 12 January - Florian Havemann, German judge, painter and composer
- 19 January - Nadiuska, German television actress
- 22 January - Aloys Wobben, German businessman
- 31 January - Jan Hofer, German journalist
- 13 February - Jörg Hacker, German microbiologist
- 17 February - Karin Büttner-Janz, German gymnast and physician
- 18 February - Ulrich Eicke, German canoeist
- 22 February - Thomas Wessinghage, German athlete
- 3 March - Wolfgang Kubicki, German football player
- 13 March - Wolfgang Rihm, German composer (died 2024)
- 18 March - Michaela May, German actress
- 24 March - Reinhard Genzel, German astrophysicist, recipient of the Nobel Prize in Physics
- 4 April - Rosemarie Ackermann, German high jumper
- 14 April - Udo Voigt (NPD) politician
- 29 April - Barbara Hendricks, German politician
- 10 May - Ulrich Hahnen, German politician
- 10 May - Roland Kaiser, German singer
- 12 May - Norbert Stolzenburg, German footballer and manager
- 17 May - Bernhard Brink, German singer
- 2 June - Hildegard Krekel, German actress (died 2013)
- 12 June - Cornelia Hanisch, German fencer
- 25 June - Klaus Teuber, German board game designer (died 2023)
- 26 July - Heiner Brand, German handball player
- 28 July - Cordt Schnibben, German author and journalist
- 3 August - Axel Schäfer, German politician
- 6 August - Christoph Biemann, German writer
- 19 August
  - Gabriela Grillo, German equestrian, Olympic champion (1976 (died 2024)
  - Bodo Hombach, German politician
- 29 August - Falk Hoffmann, German diver
- 6 September - Dominik Graf, German film director
- 21 September - Anneliese Michel, German student (died 1976)
- 2 October - Peter Koslowski German philosopher and academic (died 2012)
- 28 October - Thomas Dinger, German musician (died 2002)
- 21 November - Corny Littmann, German entrepreneur, entertainer, theater owner
- 24 November - Ilja Richter, German actor, voice actor, television presenter, singer and author
- 26 November - Jan Philipp Reemtsma, German literary scholar and political activist
- 3 December - Bruno Jonas, German Kabarett artist and actor
- 17 December - Jochen Bachfeld, German boxer
- undated - Ernst Stötzner, German actor

== Deaths ==
- 22 January - Alexander Behm, German physicist (born 1880)
- 25 January - Aloys, 7th Prince of Löwenstein-Wertheim-Rosenberg, German politician (born 1871)
- 23 February - Heinrich von Vietinghoff, German general (born 1887)
- 15 April - Ludwig Kaas, German politician (born 1881)
- 12 June - Michael von Faulhaber, German cardinal of Roman Catholic Church (born 1869)
- 3 July - Carl Tanzler, radiologic technologist (born 1877)
- 4 July - Karl Platen, German actor (born 1877)
- 6 July - Gertrud Wolle, German actress (born 1891)
- 23 July - Carl Severing, German politician (born 1875)
- 31 July - Waldemar Bonsels, German writer (born 1880)
- 12 August - Richard Otto, German physician (born 1872)
- 13 August - Wilm Hosenfeld, officer (born 1895)
- 18 December - Ernst Stromer, German paleontologist (born 1871)
