= 1951 in Germany =

Events in the year 1951 in West Germany and East Germany.

== Incumbents ==
=== West Germany ===
- President – Theodor Heuss
- Chancellor – Konrad Adenauer

=== East Germany ===
- Head of State – Wilhelm Pieck
- Head of Government – Otto Grotewohl

== Events ==
- 29 April – Rhineland-Palatinate state election, 1951
- 5 June – East German referendum, 1951
- 6 to 17 June – 1st Berlin International Film Festival
- unknown date – In Munich, a collection of mementos and personal papers belonging to Adolf Hitler is turned over to Bayerische Landesbank, for authentication and eventual sale. Among the documents are his appointment as Chancellor signed by President Paul von Hindenburg, his Austrian passport, as well as an assortment of swastika insignia pins and medals. An initial offer of $200,000.00 is made for the collection.

== Births ==
- 1 January - Hans-Joachim Stuck, racing driver
- 4 January - Richard Oetker, German businessman
- 8 January - Franz Pachl, German chess player and composer
- 28 January - Karl Honz, German athlete
- 16 February - Franz-Josef Hermann Bode, German bishop of the Roman Catholic Diocese of Osnabrück
- 24 February - Gabriele Schnaut, German opera singer (died 2023)
- 4 March - Edelgard Bulmahn, German politician
- 24 March - Monika Stolz, German politician
- 30 March - Wolfgang Niedecken, German singer
- 1 April - Johanna Wanka, German politician
- 9 April - Monika Piel, German journalist
- 17 April - Horst Hrubesch, German football player
- 18 May - Angela Voigt, German long jumper (died 2013)
- 26 June - Jürgen Rüttgers, German politician
- 28 June - Rolf Milser, German weightlifter
- 13 July - Sonia Seymour Mikich, German journalist
- 21 July - Eberhard Gienger, German politician and gymnast
- 26 July - Sabine Leutheusser-Schnarrenberger, German politician
- 31 July - Martin Mosebach, German writer
- 3 August - Hans Schlegel, German astronaut
- 5 August - Franz-Peter Hofmeister, German athlete
- 15 August - Herfried Münkler, German political scientist
- 5 September - Paul Breitner, German football player
- 22 September - Wolfgang Petry, German singer
- 24 September - Heinz Hoenig, German actor
- 29 September - Jörg Diesch, German sailor
- 29 September- Jutta Ditfurth, German sociologist, writer, and radical ecologist politician
- 5 October - Beate Heister, German businesswoman
- 20 October - Hans-Georg Aschenbach, German ski jumper
- 21 November - Thomas Roth, German journalist
- 2 December - Roman Bunka, German musician (died 2022)
- 4 December - Reinhard Eiben, German canoeist
- 14 December - Mike Krüger, German comedian
- 18 December - Volker Bouffier, German politician

== Deaths ==
- 22 January - Karl Nessler, German inventor of the permanent wave (born 1872)
- 30 January - Ferdinand Porsche, German automobile pioneer (born 1875)
- 3 February - August Horch German engineer and automobile pioneer, (born 1868)
- 8 February - Fritz Thyssen, German entrepreneur (born 1873)
- 12 March - Alfred Hugenberg, German businessman, politician and publisher (born 1865)
- 26 April - Gerda Müller, German actress (born 1894)
- 26 April - Arnold Sommerfeld, German physicist (born 1868)
- 1 July — Gustav Höhne, Wehrmacht general and Knight's Cross recipient (born 1893)
- 2 July - Ferdinand Sauerbruch, German surgeon (born 1875)
- 20 July - Wilhelm, German Crown Prince, German crown prince (born 1882)
- 26 July – Maximilian Ritter von Pohl, German air force officer (born 1893)
- 4 August - Ernst von Weizsäcker, German diplomat and politician (born 1882)
- 30 August - Erich Emminger, German politician (born 1880)
- 6 October - Otto Fritz Meyerhof, German physician and biochemist (born 1884)
- 17 October - Johann Becker, German politician (born 1869)
- October 20 - Karl Jarres, German politician (born 1874)
- 4 December - Sebastian Finsterwalder, German mathematician and glaciologist (born 1862)
