= 1875 in Germany =

- Decades: 1850s; 1860s; 1870s; 1880s; 1890s
- See also: Other events of 1875; History of Germany • Timeline • Years

Events in the year 1875 in Germany.

== Incumbents ==
=== National level ===
- Emperor – William I
- Chancellor – Otto von Bismarck

=== State level ===
==== Kingdoms ====
- King of Bavaria – Ludwig II
- King of Prussia – William I
- King of Saxony – Albert
- King of Württemberg – Charles

==== Grand Duchies ====
- Grand Duke of Baden – Frederick I
- Grand Duke of Hesse – Louis III
- Grand Duke of Mecklenburg-Schwerin – Frederick Francis II
- Grand Duke of Mecklenburg-Strelitz – Frederick William
- Grand Duke of Oldenburg – Peter II
- Grand Duke of Saxe-Weimar-Eisenach – Charles Alexander

==== Principalities ====
- Schaumburg-Lippe – Adolf I, Prince of Schaumburg-Lippe
- Schwarzburg-Rudolstadt – George Albert, Prince of Schwarzburg-Rudolstadt
- Schwarzburg-Sondershausen – Günther Friedrich Karl II, Prince of Schwarzburg-Sondershausen
- Principality of Lippe – Leopold III, Prince of Lippe to 8 December, then Woldemar, Prince of Lippe
- Reuss Elder Line – Heinrich XXII, Prince Reuss of Greiz
- Reuss Younger Line – Heinrich XIV, Prince Reuss Younger Line
- Waldeck and Pyrmont – George Victor, Prince of Waldeck and Pyrmont

==== Duchies ====
- Duke of Anhalt – Frederick I, Duke of Anhalt
- Duke of Brunswick – William, Duke of Brunswick
- Duke of Saxe-Altenburg – Ernst I, Duke of Saxe-Altenburg
- Duke of Saxe-Coburg and Gotha – Ernest II, Duke of Saxe-Coburg and Gotha
- Duke of Saxe-Meiningen – Georg II, Duke of Saxe-Meiningen

== Events ==
- 22–27 May – The Gotha Program is adopted by the Social Democratic Party of Germany.
- 27 May – German company Soennecken is founded
- 28 June – German company Lürssen is founded
- 16 August – The Hermannsdenkmal was inaugurated in Detmold.

=== Undated ===
- German company Bauer Media Group is founded
- German company Schiesser is founded
- Congregations Law
- The weekly medical journal, Deutsche Medizinische Wochenschrift, is established in Germany by Paul Börner.
- Hotel Kaiserhof opens in Berlin.

== Births ==
- 4 February – Ludwig Prandtl, German engineer (died 1953)
- 6 February – Otto Gessler, German politician (died 1955)
- 18 February – Wilhelm Külz, German politician (died 1948)
- 26 February – Erich Koch-Weser, German lawyer and politician (died 1944)
- 22 March – Hans Grimm, German writer (died 1959)
- 17 May – Ernst Friedberger, German immunologist and hygienist (died 1932)
- 1 June – Carl Severing, German politician (died 1952)
- 6 June – Thomas Mann, German novelist, short story writer, social critic, philanthropist (died 1955)
- 22 June – Johannes Baader, German architect, writer and artist (died 1955)
- 3 July – Ferdinand Sauerbruch, German surgeon (died 1951)
- 3 September – Ferdinand Porsche, German automotive engineer (died 1951)
- 20 September – Matthias Erzberger, German politician (died 1921)
- 23 September – Hedwig Wangel, German actress (died 1961)
- 11 October – August Marahrens, German Protestant bishop who served as Landesbischof of the Evangelical-Lutheran Church of Hanover (died 1950)
- 12 October – Emil Rudolf Weiß, German painter and poet (died 1942)
- 31 October – Heinrich Thyssen, German entrepreneur and art collector (died 1947)
- 4 November – Arthur Crispien, German politician (died 1946)
- 20 November – Friedrich Werner von der Schulenburg, German diplomat (died 1944)
- 9 December – Carl Wentzel, German farmer (died 1944)
- 12 December – Gerd von Rundstedt, German field marshal (died 1953)
- 14 December – Paul Löbe, German politician (died 1967)

== Deaths ==
- 4 January – Michael Deinlein, German bishop (born 1800)
- 6 January – Frederick William, Elector of Hesse, German nobleman (born 1802)

11 April - Heinrich Schwabe, a German amateur astronomer.

- 20 May – Carl Heinrich Theodor Knorr, German businessman and founder of the company Knorr (born 1800)
- 4 June – Eduard Mörike, German poet (born 1804)
- 18 June – Wilhelm Paul Corssen, German philologist (born 1820)
- 20 June – Wilhelm Bauer, German engineer (born 1822)
- 15 October – Theodor Hosemann, German painter and illustrator (born 1807)
- 4 November – Robert von Mohl, German Jurist (born 1799)
- 8 December – Leopold III, Prince of Lippe, German nobleman (born 1821)
