= 1955 in Germany =

- Decades: 1930s; 1940s; 1950s; 1960s; 1970s
- See also: Other events of 1955; History of Germany • Timeline • Years

Events in the year 1955 in Germany.

== Incumbents ==
- President – Theodor Heuss
- Chancellor – Konrad Adenauer
- Second Adenauer cabinet

== Events ==
- 15 May - Rhineland-Palatinate state election, 1955
- 24 June - 5 July - 5th Berlin International Film Festival
- 2 July - Tierpark Berlin opened.
- 15 July - 18 September - documenta 1 in Kassel
- 11 August - 1955 Altensteig mid-air collision
- 20 September - Treaty on Relations between the USSR and the GDR

== Births ==
- 4 January - Wolfgang Tiefensee, German politician
- 10 January
  - Volker Mosblech, German politician (d. 2024)
  - Michael Schenker, German guitarist, songwriter and producer
- 14 January - Jan Fedder, German actor (died 2019)
- 16 January - Martin Roth, German museum director (died 2017)
- 18 January - Gerburg Jahnke, German comedian
- 25 January - Petra Gerster, German journalist
- 1 February
  - Hans Werner Olm, German comedian
  - Christian, Duke of Oldenburg, head of the Grand Ducal Family of Oldenburg
- 10 February - Bernd Martin, German football player (died 2018)
- 6 March - Friedbert Pflüger, German politician
- 8 March - Thomas Bellut, German journalist
- 11 March - Nina Hagen, German musician
- 21 March - Bärbel Wöckel, German sprinter
- 26 March - Verena Butalikakis, German politician (died 2018)
- 13 April - Ole von Beust, German politician
- 29 April - Klaus Siebert, German biathlete (died 2016)
- 15 May - Claudia Roth, German politician
- 15 May - Alexander Pusch, German fencer
- 26 May - Doris Dörrie, German film director
- 2 June - Heiko von der Leyen, German physician
- 10 June - Annette Schavan, German politician
- 11 June - Marie Gruber, German actress
- 25 June - Martin Petzold, German opera singer (died 2023)
- 1 July - Rosemarie Wenner, German Methodist bishop
- 29 July - Christian Tramitz, German actor, comedian, voice actor and author
- 9 August - Udo Beyer, German track and field athlete
- 15 August - Roger Willemsen, German author, essayist and TV presenter (died 2016)
- 20 August - Helge Schneider, German comedian, jazz musician and multi-instrumentalist, author, film and theatre director, and actor
- 25 August - Gerd Müller, German politician
- 2 September - Claus Kleber, German journalist
- 14 September - Wilhelm Huxhorn, German footballer (died 2010)
- 20 September
  - Georg Christoph Biller, German choral conductor (died 2022)
  - Lilo Wanders, German transvestite entertainer, comedian and theatre/television host
- 22 September - Karl-Heinz Rummenigge, German football player and trainer
- 25 September - Peter Müller, German politician
- 25 September - Richy Müller, German actor
- 30 September - Andy Bechtolsheim, German businessman
- 11 October - Hans-Peter Briegel, German footballer
- 25 October - Peter Nocke, German swimmer
- 7 November - Norbert Eder, German footballer (died 2019)
- 10 November - Roland Emmerich, German film director, screenwriter, and producer
- 11 November - Friedrich Merz, German politician
- 8 December - Martin Semmelrogge, German actor
- 15 December - Renate Künast, German politician
- 22 December - Thomas C. Südhof, German biochemist
- 31 December - Gregor Braun, German cyclist

== Deaths ==
- 15 January — Johannes Baader, German architect, writer and artist (born 1875)
- 24 January - Friedrich Wilhelm Kopsch, German anatomist (born 1868)
- 20 February — Eugen Schmalenbach, German economist (born 1873)
- 24 March - Otto Gessler, German politician (born 1875)
- 18 April — Albert Einstein, German theoretical physicist (born 1879)
- 29 May - Rudolf Klein-Rogge, German actor (born 1885)
- 29 June - Ernst Legal, German actor (born 1881)
- 29 June — Max Pechstein, German painter (born 1881)
- 2 August - Rupprecht, Crown Prince of Bavaria, German nobleman (born 1869)
- 12 August — Thomas Mann, German author (born 1875)
- 13 August — Wilhelm Kreis, German architect (born 1873)
- 19 August - Otto Weiß, Luftwaffe officer (born 1907)
- 25 August - Heinrich Spoerl, German author (born 1887)
- 31 August:
  - Willi Baumeister, German painter, scenic designer, art professor and typographer (born 1889)
  - Eberhard Koebel, German youth leader and writer (born 1907)
- 9 October — Joseph Vollmer, German engineer (born 1871)
- 15 December — Otto Braun, German politician (born 1872)
- 19 December - Herbert von Dirksen, German diplomat (born 1882)
- 25 December - Angela Zigahl, German teacher and politician (born 1885)
