= Neue Automobil Gesellschaft =

German automobile manufacturer

Neue Automobil-Gesellschaft AG
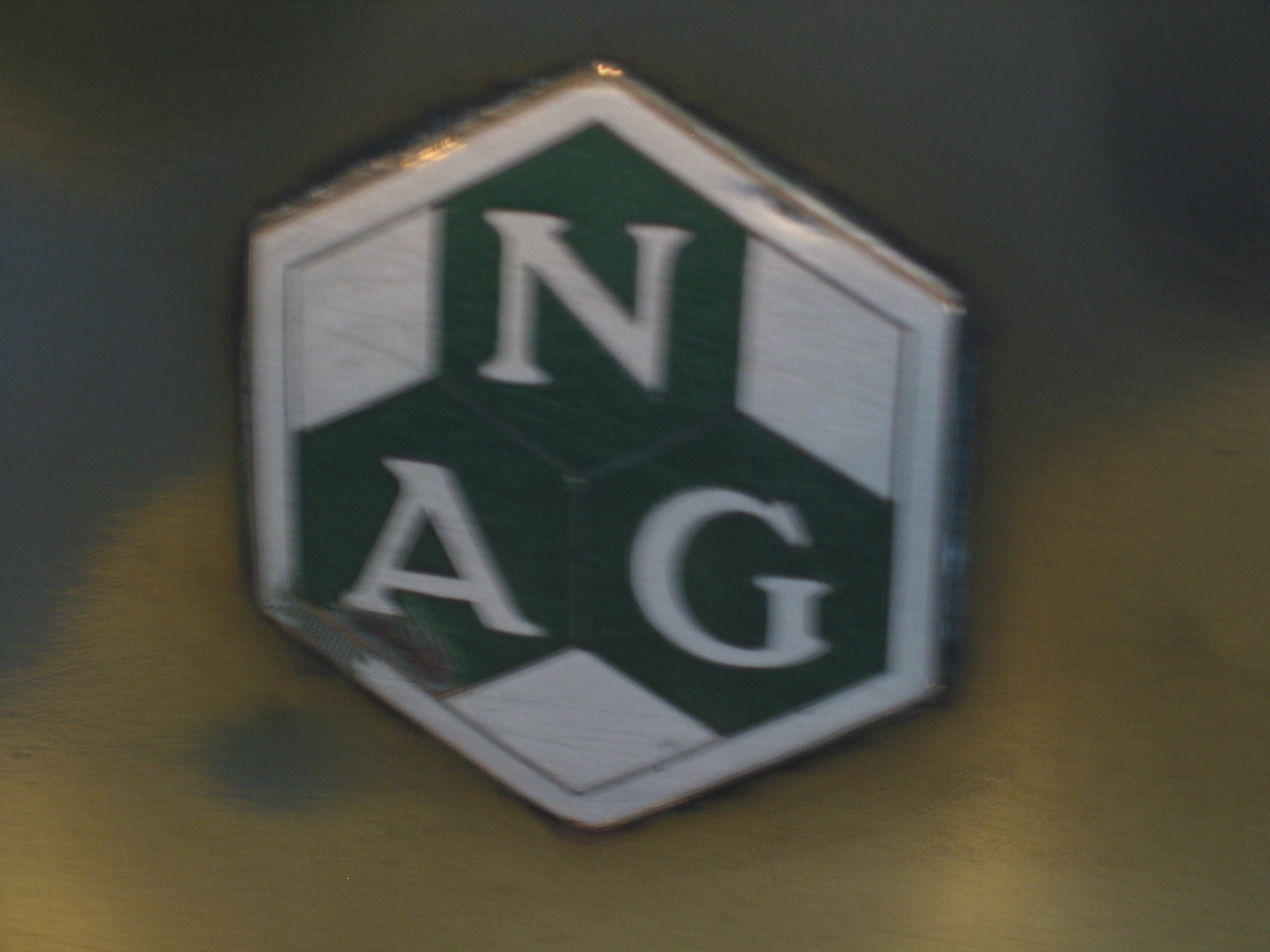
- Industry: Automotive
- Predecessor: Presto Works
- Founded: 1901
- Defunct: 1934
- Fate: Merged with Büssing AG
- Successor: Büssing-NAG
- Headquarters: Berlin, Germany
- Key people: Emil Rathenau, founder
- Products: Automobiles and Trucks
- Parent: AEG

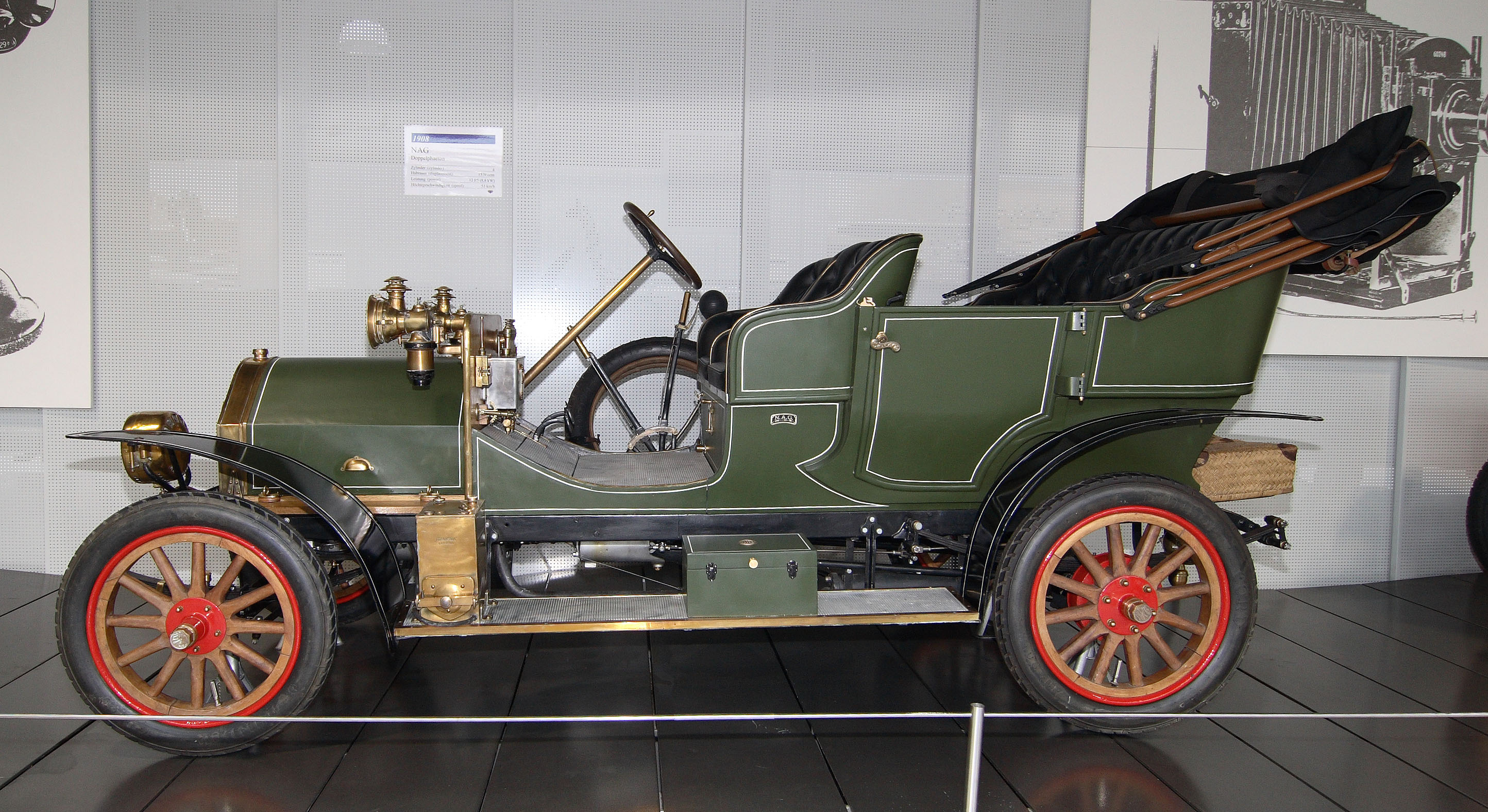
NAG car from 1908

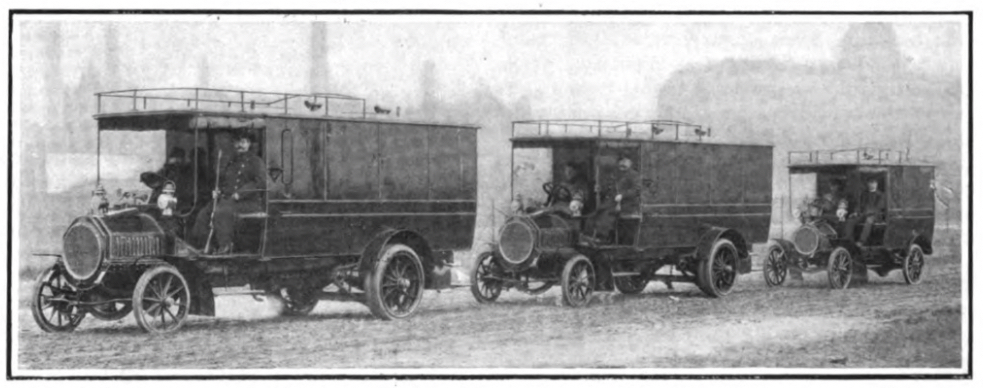
N.A.G. L 4 and one N.A.G. A.C.2 (1909)

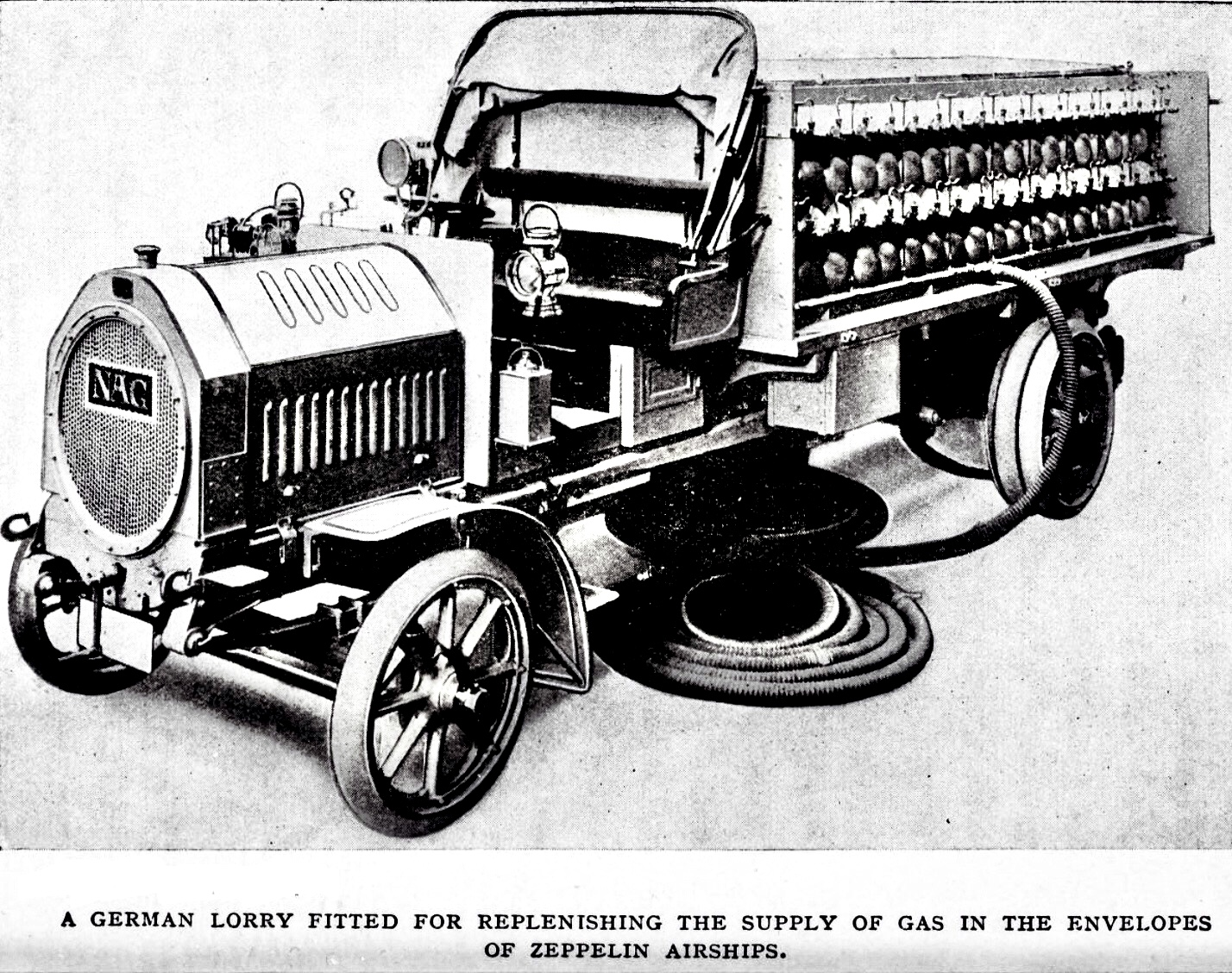
NAG Zeppelin refilling Lorry (1914).

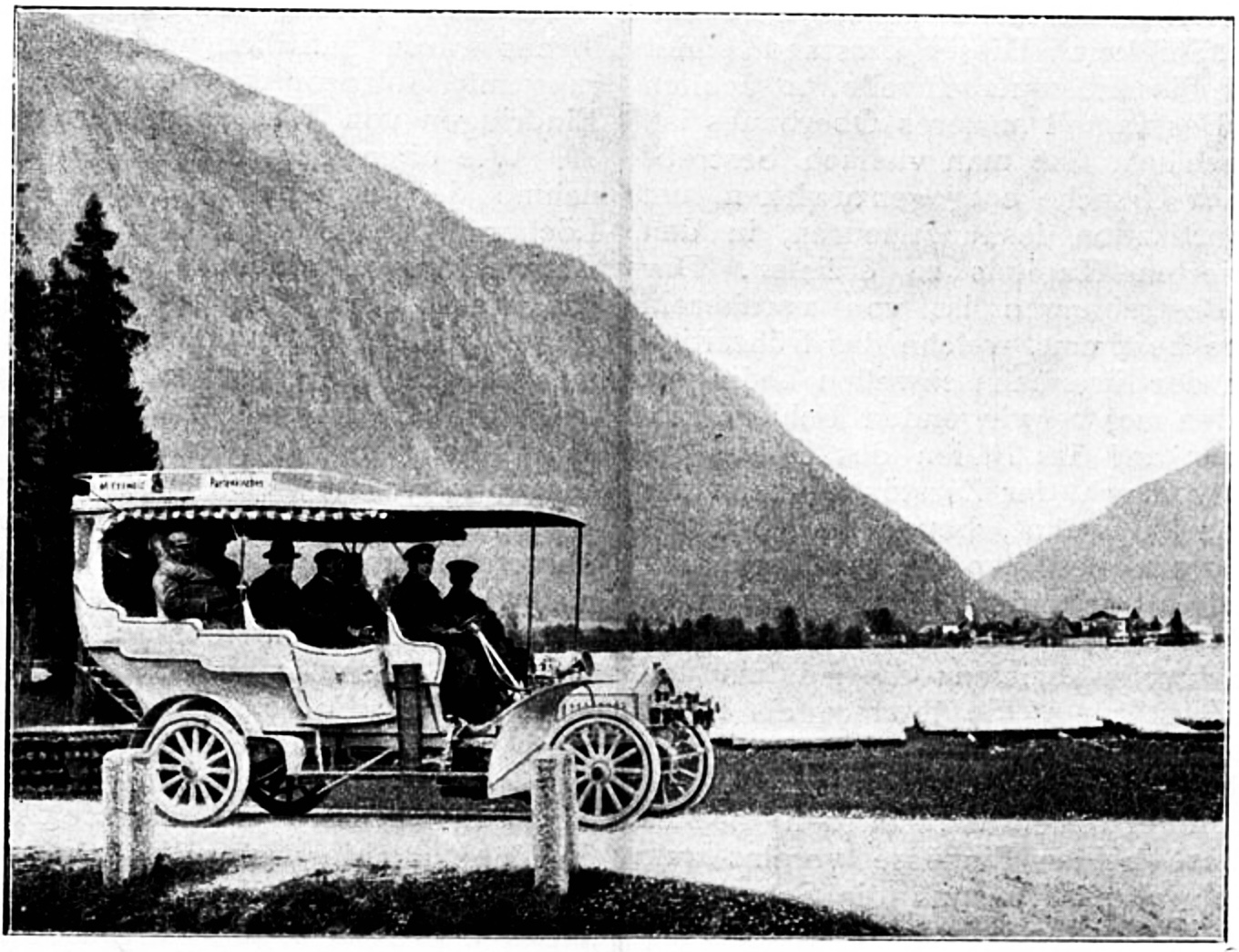
N.A.G. Type B Omnibus 20-24 (1905)

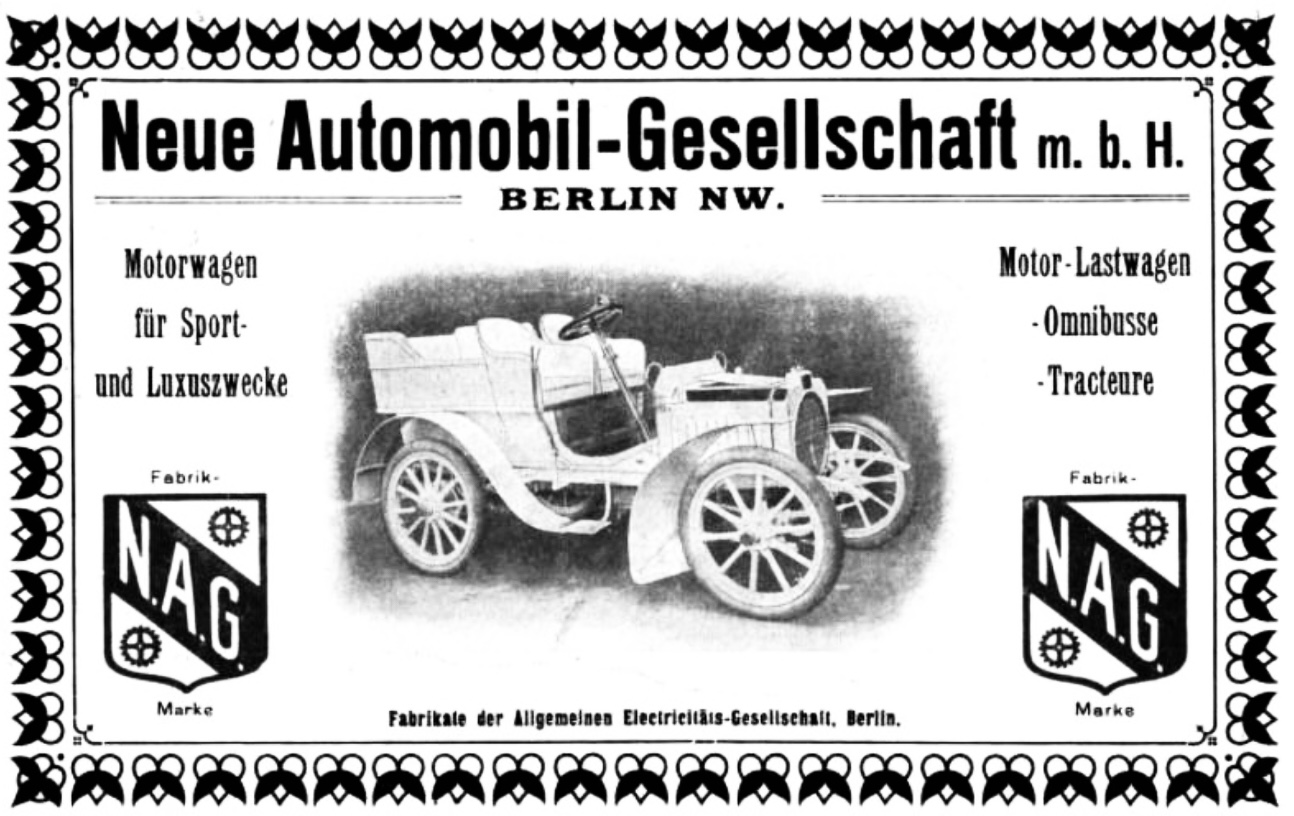
N.A.G. advertisement (1903)

The Neue Automobil-Gesellschaft (NAG), or Nationale Automobil-Gesellschaft after it changed its name in 1915, was a German automobile manufacturer in Berlin.

In 1902, German electrical company AEG purchased the coachbuilding branch of Kühlstein, under engineer Joseph Vollmer, renaming it NAG. The company's first two cars were reliable, if unoriginal: the two-cylinder Typ A and 5.2 liter (317ci) four-cylinder Typ B, both with chain drive, which resembled contemporary Mercédès. Shortly, an enlarged Typ B2, with 40/45hp (30kW) 7.9-liter (482ci) four, appeared. In 1907, one of these was given to the Empress Auguste Viktoria.

The next year, AEG got out of the car business, but NAG continued alone, introducing a 15 hp (11 kW) 1502 cc (91.7ci) four called Puck, with a remarkable (for the period) ability to rev to 3000 rpm, which may have contributed to its achievement of winning the Gothenburg Cup at the Swedish Winter Trials three years in a row, in 1912, 1913, and 1914. This sporting reputation was balanced by "aggressively ugly Prince Henry-type bodies".

The Puck would later be developed into a model known in Germany as the Darling. From 1911 to 1914, NAG's standard offering was an 8495 cc (518ci) 60 hp (44.7 kW), joined in 1912-14 by a 1502 cc (91.7ci) 10/12 hp (7.5 kW) K2, 2085 cc (127ci) 14/20 hp (10 kW) K4, 3308 cc (202ci) 20/25 hp (15 kW) K5, and a 5193 cc (317ci) 25/35 hp (19 kW).

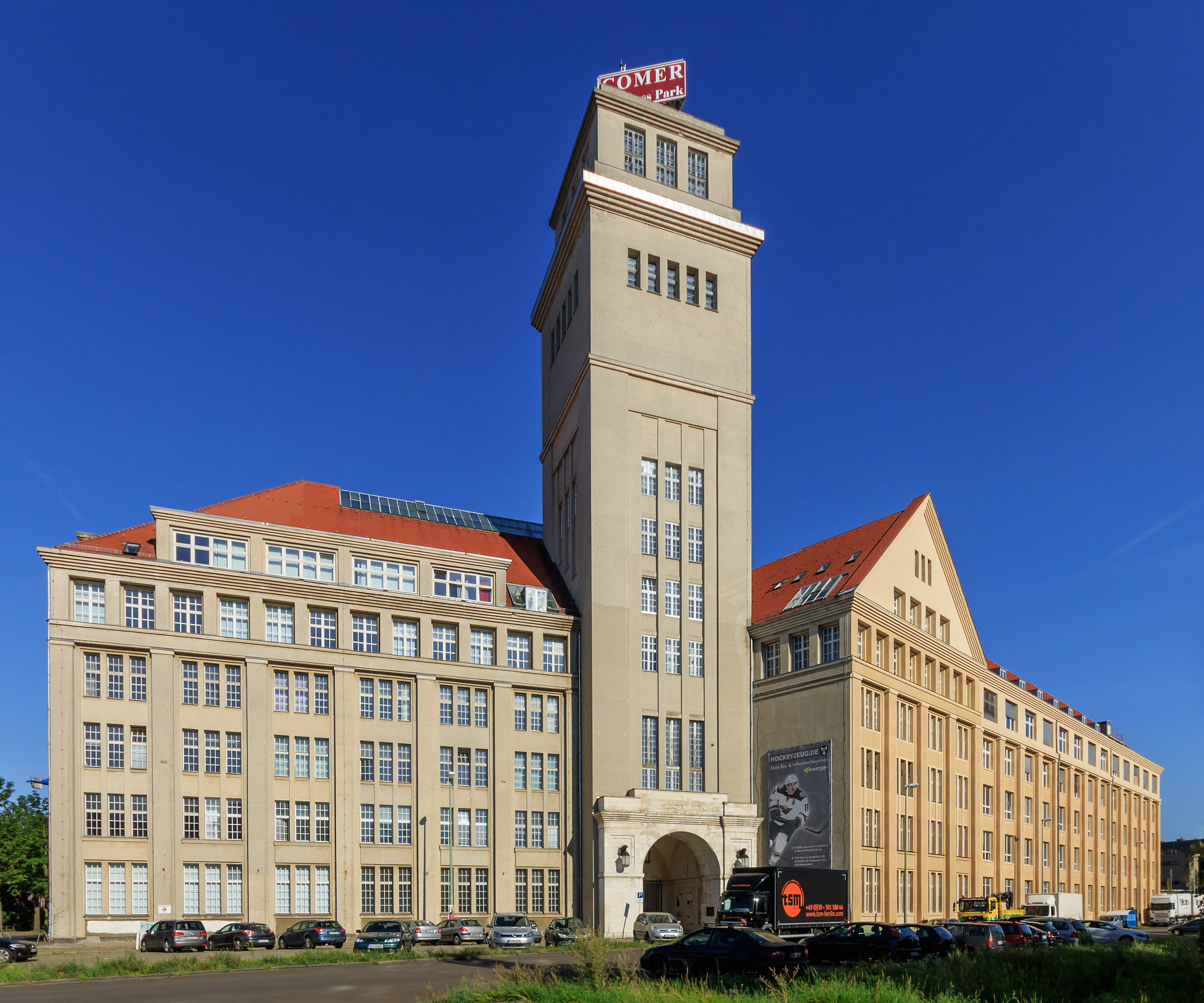
NAG building by Peter Behrens in Berlin-Oberschöneweide

During the recovery after World War I, NAG produced smaller numbers of 2.5-liter (153ci) C4s, essentially prewar K4s with new vee radiators replacing the prewar oval ones.

The economic situation was so serious, NAG partnered with Brennabor, Lloyd, and Hansa to form GDA (the equivalent of a US trust), to prevent competition from destroying all of them. It proved successful for NAG, which prospered enough to build the C4b sports variant, designed by chief engineer Christian Riecken (a prewar Minerva racing driver).

Riecken ran a C4b at the newly opened AVUS in 1922, winning at 84.3 mph (135.7 km/h), which was greater than the C4's top speed. It sacrificed nothing to reliability, as NAG went on to place well at the 1923 All-Russian Trials and the ADAC Reich Trials for 1923-26. In 1924, NAG hit its apex at Monza, where Riecken and Hans Berthold won the Gran Premio della Norte in a C4b, covering 1656 mi (2665 km) in 24 hours, an average of 68.99 mph (111.02 km/h), for which the model was renamed Monza.

In 1926, Protos (which had built the winner of the New York-Paris race) was acquired from Siemens-Schuckert, leading to "a series of dull six-cylinder cars". The next year, NAG again expanded by taking over Presto, which had just bought Dux, and continuing to build the 2.6-liter Typ F and 3-liter Typ G. The difficulty was that despite their quality, none of them was distinctly different from other German cars of the period.

In response, NAG created a disastrous straight-eight (abandoned due to crankshaft whip), which was never built, then hired former Impéria Automobiles and Steiger man Paul Henze, "one of Germany's most gifted car designers", in an effort to remedy this situation with a new top-line car. Henze settled on a 4540 cc (277ci) V8, Germany's first to enter production which became "one of the outstanding German luxury cars of 1931, the NAG 212."

Rather than rely on conventional shaft drive, however, NAG chose to attempt to fit a Voran FWD system (designed by Richard Bussien) to a backbone chassis with independent suspension, which proved too ambitious, and the development costs disastrous.

In 1934, NAG ceased car production, while NAG-Büssing commercial vehicles continued to be produced for a few more years.

During the Second World War, the company produced the Sd.Kfz. 231, Sd.Kfz. 232, Sd.Kfz. 233, and Sd.Kfz. 234 series armoured cars.

== See also ==
- Büssing

== Notes ==
- Oswald, Werner (2001). Deutsche Autos 1920-1945, Band (vol) 2 (in German). Motorbuch Verlag. p. 271. ISBN 3-613-02170-6.
