= LK I =

German light tank prototype

Leichter Kampfwagen LKI
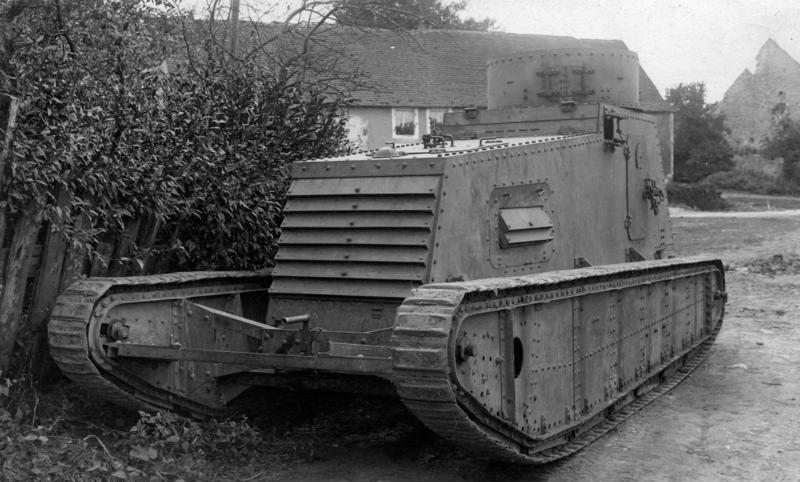
- Type: Light tank
- Place of origin: German Empire

Service history
- Used by: German Empire

Specifications
- Mass: 6.89 t
- Length: 5.08 m
- Width: 1.95 m
- Height: 2.52 m
- Crew: 3
- Armor: 8–14 mm
- Main armament: 1 × 7.92 mm MG 08 machine gun
- Engine: Daimler-Benz 4-cylinder 60 hp (44.7 kW)
- Suspension: unsprung
- Operational range: 70 km
- Maximum speed: 14–18 km/h

The Leichter Kampfwagen (English: light combat vehicle) or "LK I" was a German light tank prototype of the First World War. Designed to be a cheap light tank as opposed to the expensive heavies coming into service at the time, the tank only reached the prototype stage before the end of the war.

== History ==
The LK I was designed by Joseph Vollmer. It was based on a Daimler car chassis, with the sprocket and idler wheels mounted to the existing axles, and, like a car, had the engine in front. The LK I was the first German tank to have a turret, with it being mounted at the rear of the vehicle and armed with a 7.92 mm MG08 machine gun. Armor ranged from 8mm to 14mm thick and it was powered by a 4-cylinder Daimler-Benz Otto Model 1910 engine which gave it a top speed of 14 km/h and a range of 70km.

Only two prototypes were produced in mid 1918, but no vehicles were ordered. Designed as an experimental cavalry tank, it paved the way to the LK II.
