= LK II =

German light tank prototype

Leichter Kampfwagen II
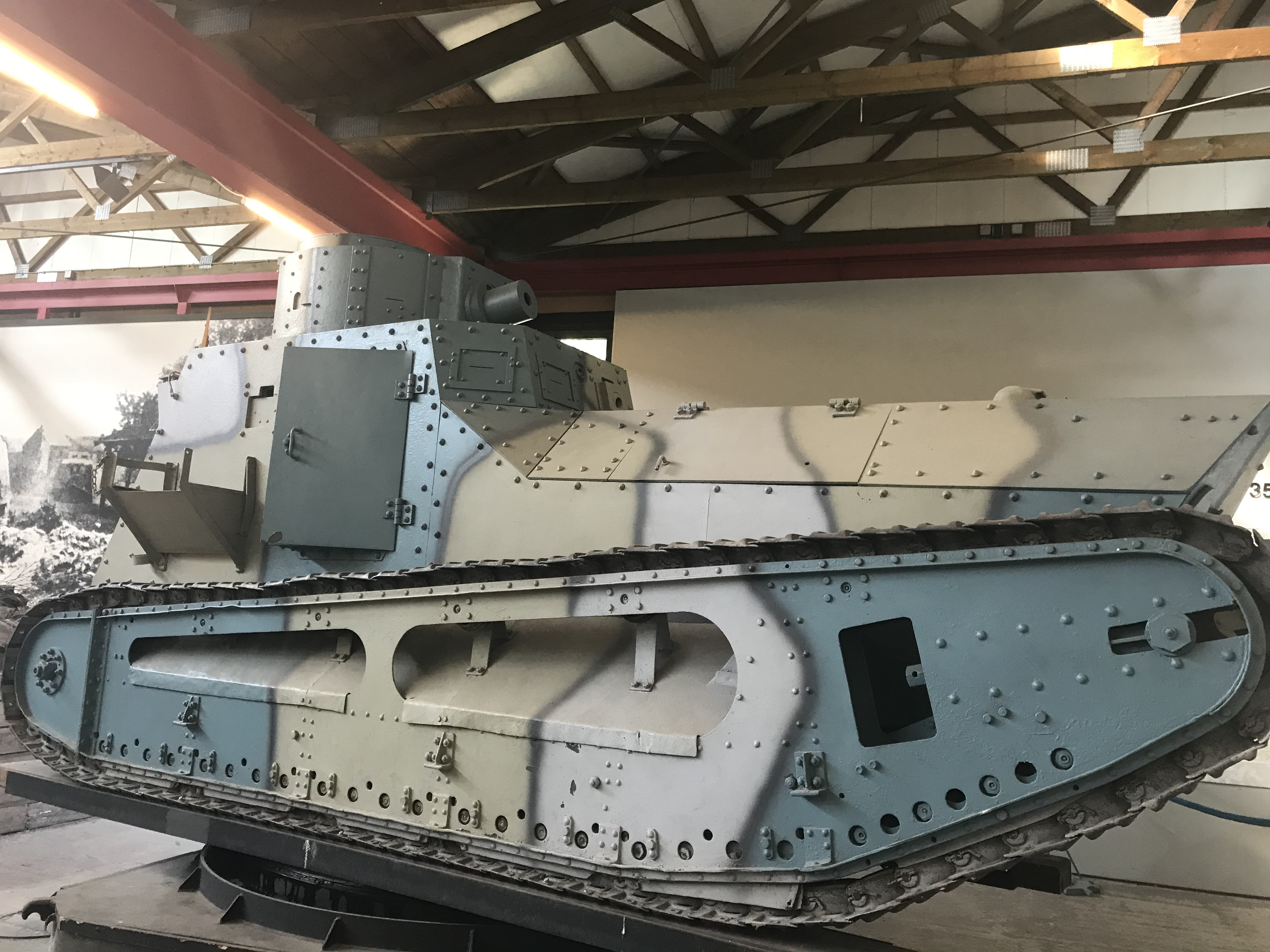
- The M/21-29 at the German Tank Museum, modified back to its original German design
- Type: Light tank
- Place of origin: Germany

Specifications
- Mass: 8.75 t
- Length: 5.1 m
- Width: 1.9 m (6 ft 3 in)
- Height: 2.5 m (8 ft 2 in)
- Crew: 3
- Armor: 8-14 mm
- Main armament: 37mm Krupp/5.7 cm Maxim-Nordenfelt
- Engine: Daimler-Benz 4-cylinder 60 hp (45 kW)
- Suspension: unsprung
- Operational range: 65–70 km (40–43 mi)
- Maximum speed: 14–18 km/h (8.7–11.2 mph)

The Leichter Kampfwagen II ("light combat vehicle"), commonly known as the LK II, was a light tank designed and produced in limited numbers in Germany in the last year of World War I. A development of the LK I, it incorporated a fixed rear superstructure and had two distinct configurations; one variant being armed with the MG 08/15, and the other being armed with a 5.7 cm Maxim-Nordenfelt gun. Its armor was 8 to 14 mm thick, which led to a total weight of 8.75 tons. Power was provided by a Daimler-Benz Model 1910 4-cylinder 55-60 hp gasoline engine, giving a maximum speed of 14 to 18 km/h with range of 65–70 km.

The LK II was designed by German engineer and automobile designer Joseph Vollmer, who also designed the A7V, the K-Wagen and the LK I. Vollmer was appointed to the position of chief designer for the German War Department's motor vehicle section

Only two prototypes were produced by June 1918, and were followed by orders for 580 tanks, which were never completed.

== Stridsvagn m/21-29 ==
Stridsvagn m/21-29
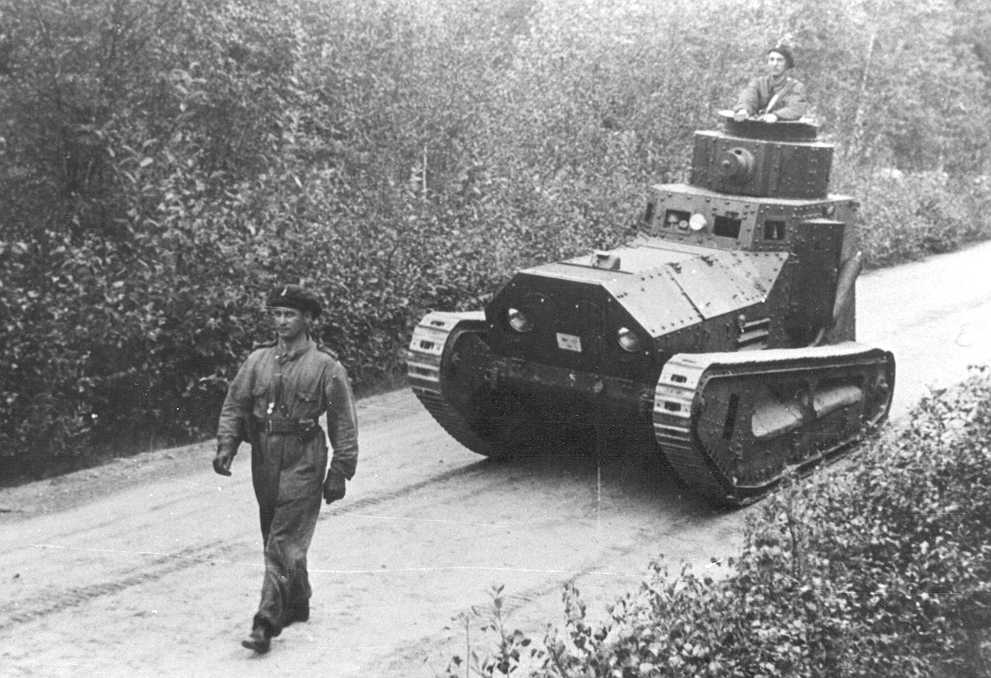
- A Swedish m/21 tank
- Type: Light tank
- Place of origin: Sweden

Service history
- In service: 1922-1939
- Used by: Sweden

Production history
- Designer: AB Landsverk
- Manufacturer: AB Landsverk / NOHAB
- No. built: 10

Specifications
- Mass: 9.7 short tons (8.8 t; 8.7 long tons)
- Length: 5.7 m (19 ft)
- Width: 2.05 m (6 ft 9 in)
- Height: 2.52 m (8 ft 3 in)
- Crew: 4
- Armor: 4-14 mm
- Main armament: 2x ksp m/14 (Stridsvagn m/21), 2x ksp m/14-29 (Stridsvagn m/21/29)
- Engine: Benz 1910 (Stridsvagn m/21), Scania 1554 (Stridsvagn m/21-29); 55 hp, 85 hp
- Maximum speed: 16 to 18 km/h (9.9 to 11.2 mph)

=== Sweden ===
After the war, the Swedish government bought parts for 10 examples in secrecy for 200,000 Swedish kronor. The parts were shipped under the pretence of being boiler plates and agricultural equipment and then assembled in Sweden as the Stridsvagn m/21 (Strv m/21 for short), which was essentially an improved version of the LK II prototype. The Strv m/21 was powered by a sleeve valve engine located in the front, the driver and crew being in the rear. The suspension and running gear was protected by armored skirts. Ten of these tanks were built, their armament a single 6.5 mm (0.26 in) Schwarzlose machine gun.

In 1929, five were rebuilt to create the Strv m/21-29 variant which was armed with a 37mm gun or two machine guns and was powered by a Scania-Vabis engine. The Strv m/21-29 was an upgraded version of the fm/21. The modifications included a more powerful engine, a new alternator, and external lighting. One of these improved vehicles was driven by Heinz Guderian during a visit to Sweden in 1929.

The Germans later bought a main share of the Landsverk Company and made Otto Merker the main designer and in 1931, it produced the Strv m/31 (L-10), which was the first tank produced in Sweden.

The Strv m/21-29 remained in service until 1938. A surviving example can be seen at the Deutsches Panzermuseum at Munster, Germany, and both strv m/21 and strv m/21-29 was displayed at the Axvall Tank Museum in Sweden.

One Strv m/21-29 is in the early stages of being restored to full working order in Sweden. As of 2018, the tank has been restored to running condition, and is now on display at the Swedish Tank Museum Arsenalen in Strängnäs.
