= Kühlstein =

Kühlstein Wagenbau
- Industry: Manufacturing
- Founded: 1833
- Defunct: 1926
- Fate: Bankruptcy
- Headquarters: (Berlin)-Charlottenburg, Germany
- Key people: Eduard Kühlstein, founder (1804–1867)
- Products: Carriages, automobiles & coachworks

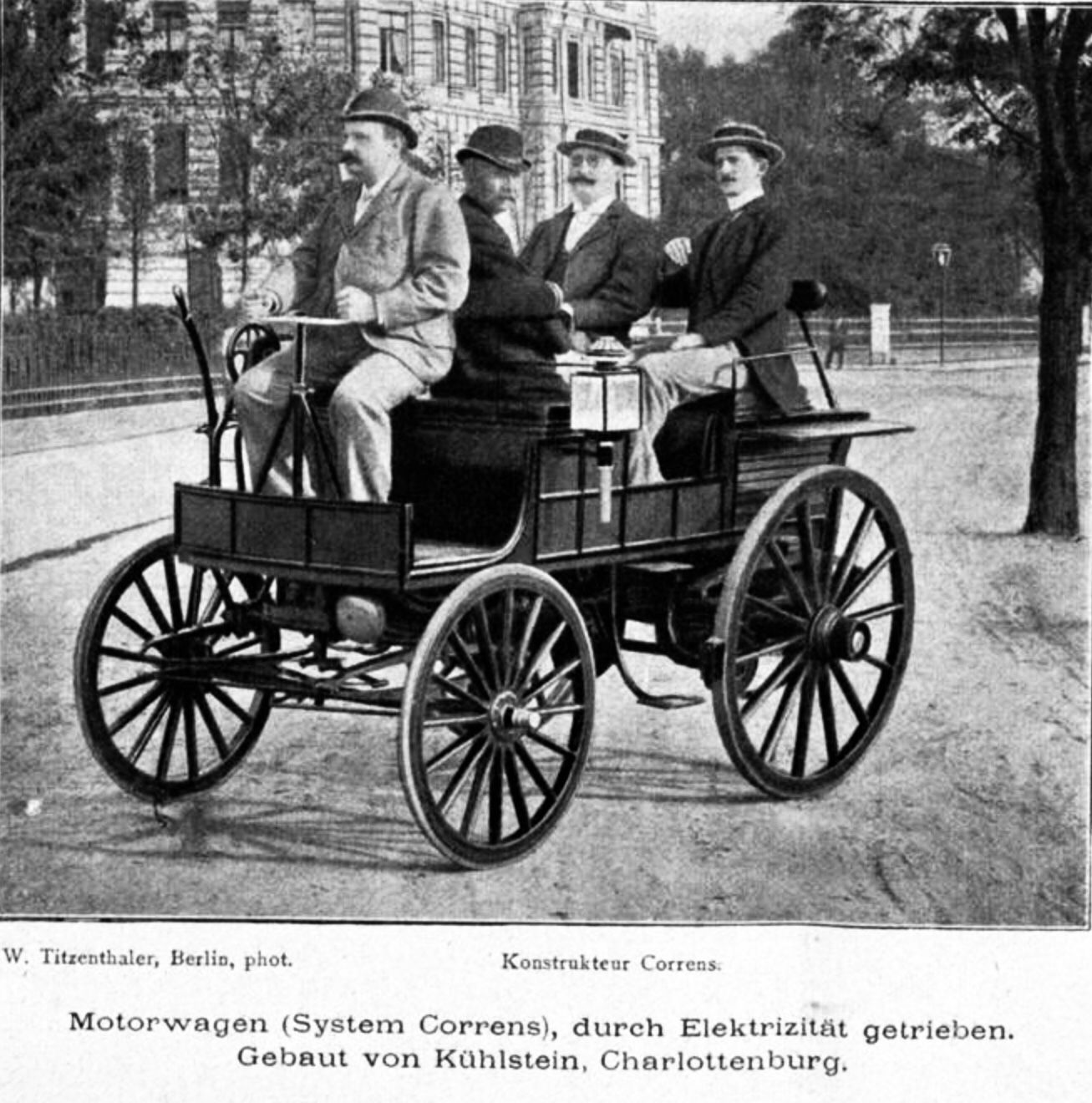
Kühlstein - Correns; The vehicle shown at the Berlin Motor Exhibition was designed by Mr. Correns after Max Leuschner had left the company.(1897).

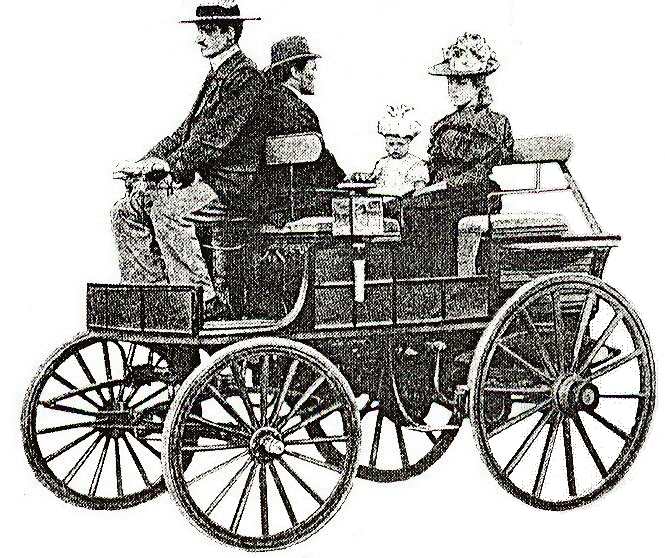
Kühlstein electric vehicle at the Berlin Motor Show in September 1897.

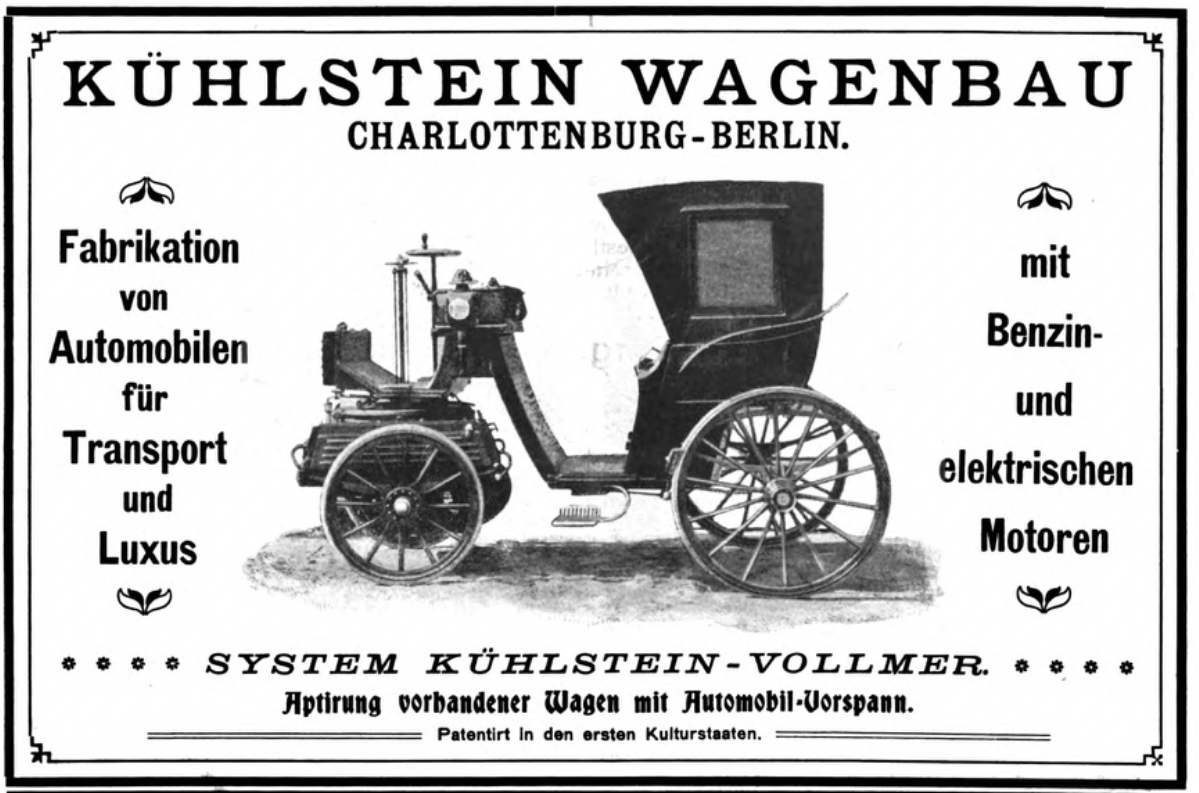
Kühlstein-Vollmer electric vehicle "Avant Train" (1899).

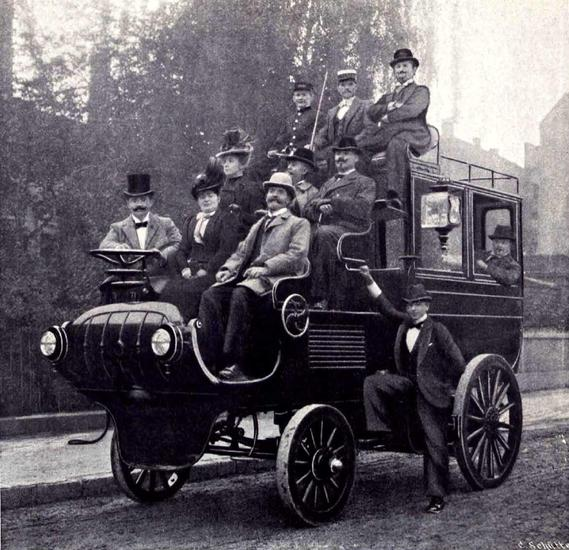
Kühlstein-electric-Mail-Coach (1899).

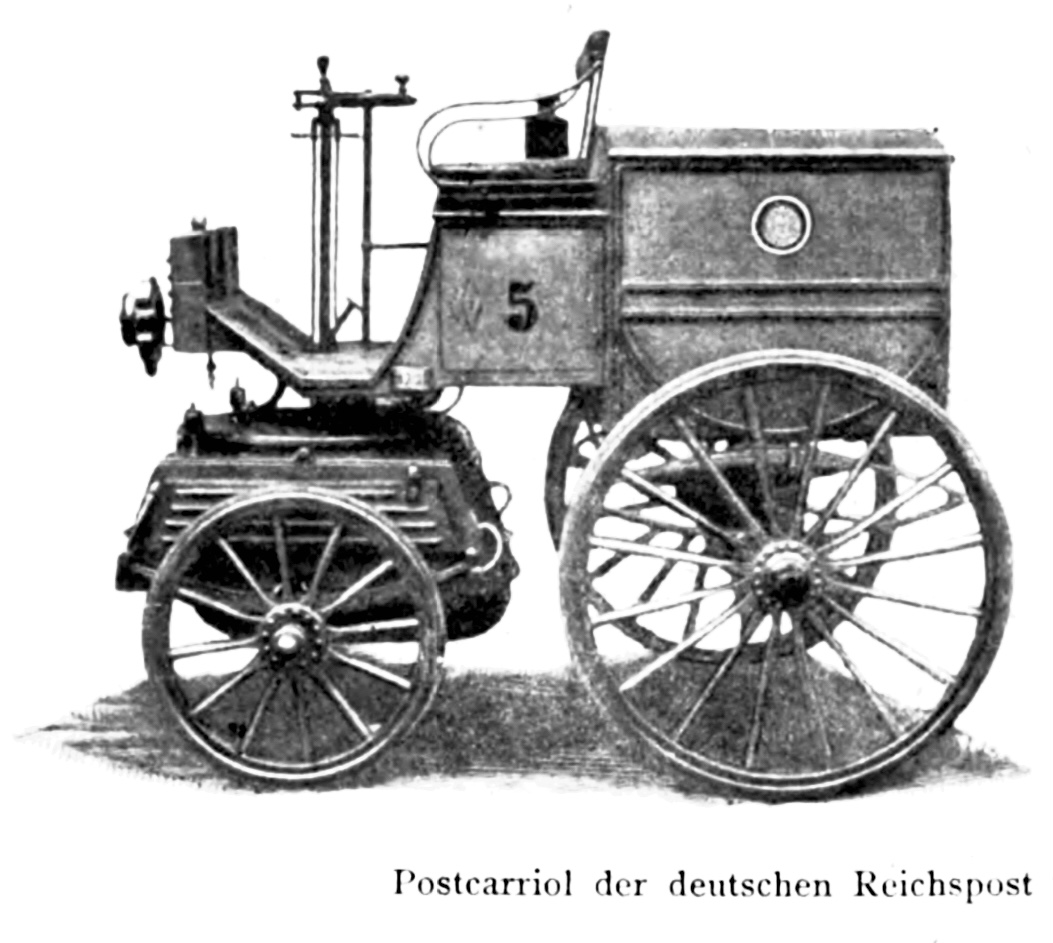
Kühlstein-Vollmer Postcarriol (1899).

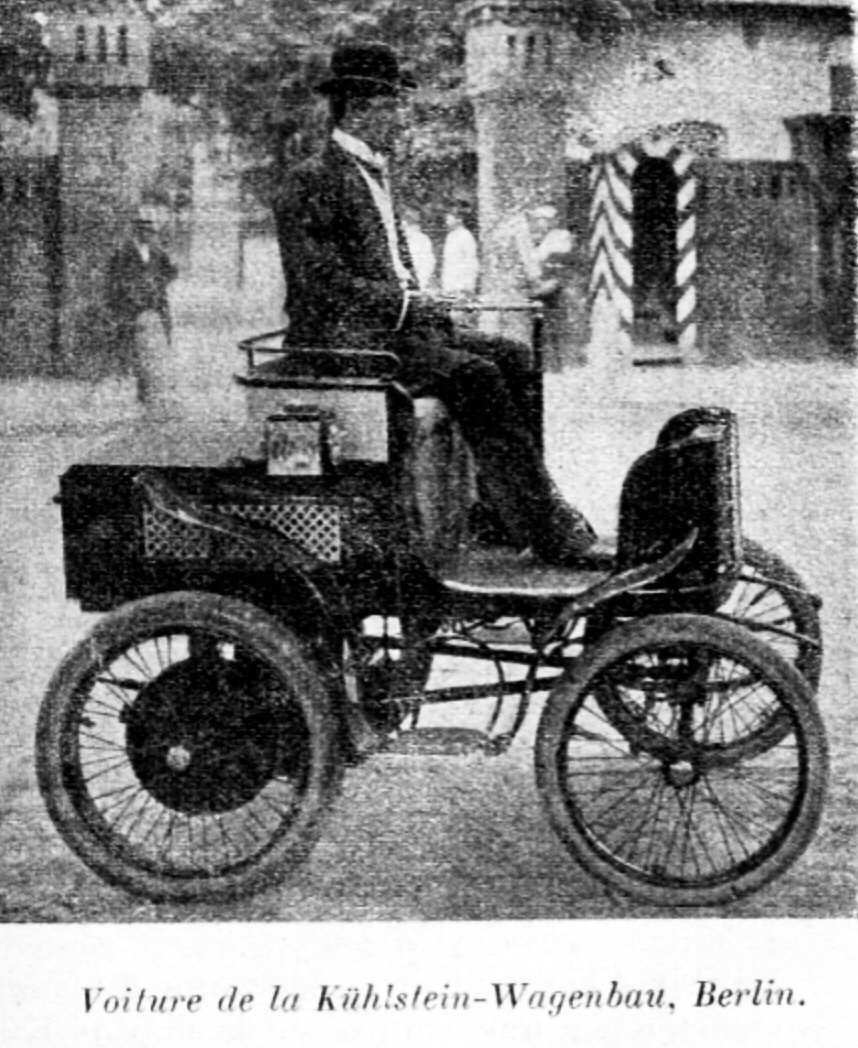
Kühlstein-Vollmer (1900).

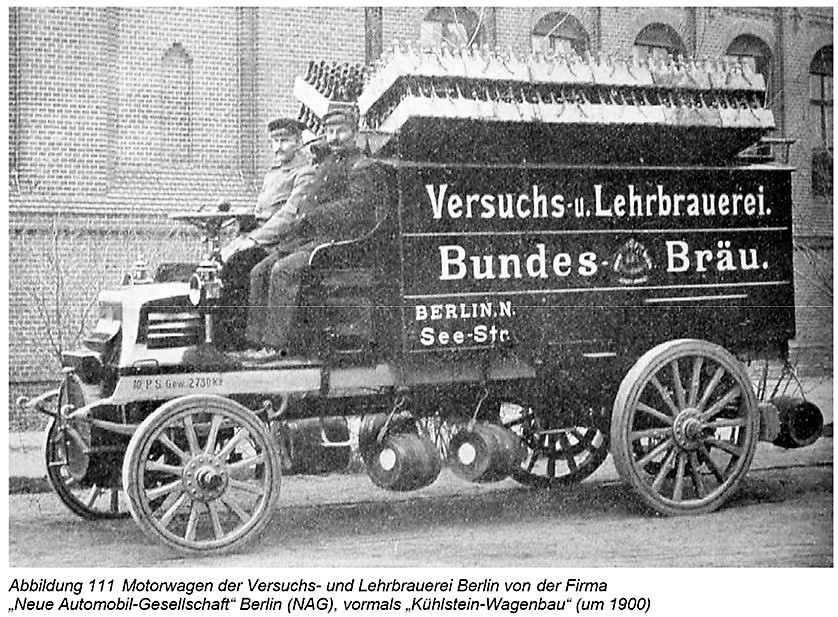
Kühlstein-Vollmer truck with 10 hp of the experimental and teaching brewery for beer in Berlin (1900).

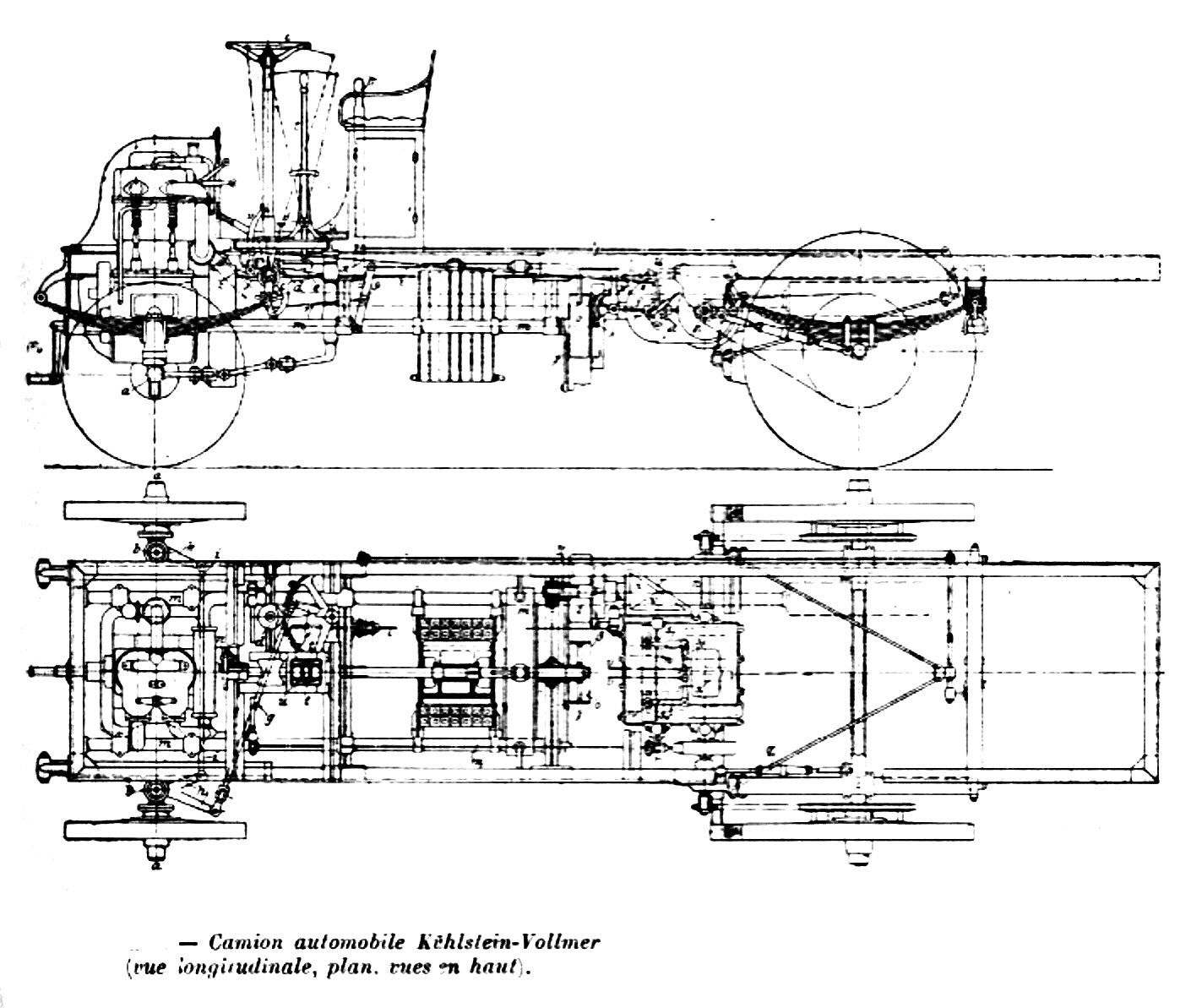
Design Drawing Kühlstein-Vollmer truck 5 t with 10 hp (1900).

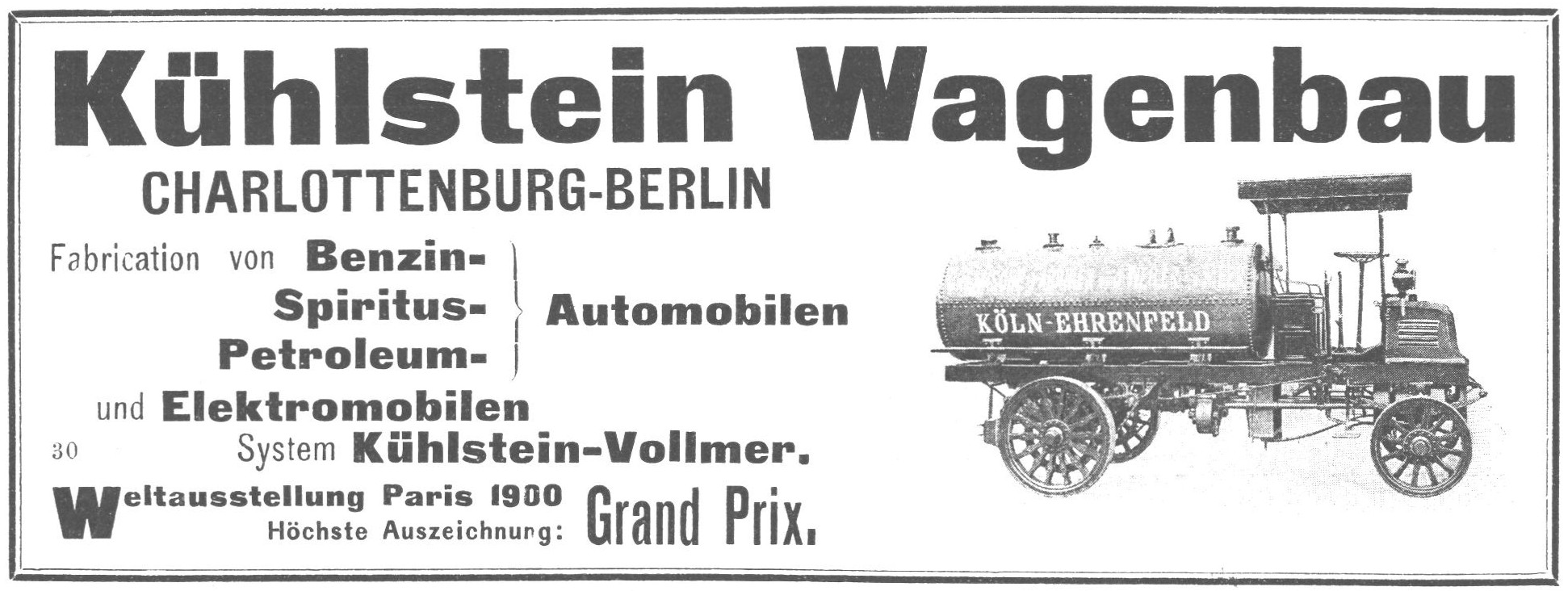
Kühlstein - The world's first sulphuric acid transport truck with a petrol engine for the chemical company Dr. E. ter Meer & Cie. (1902).

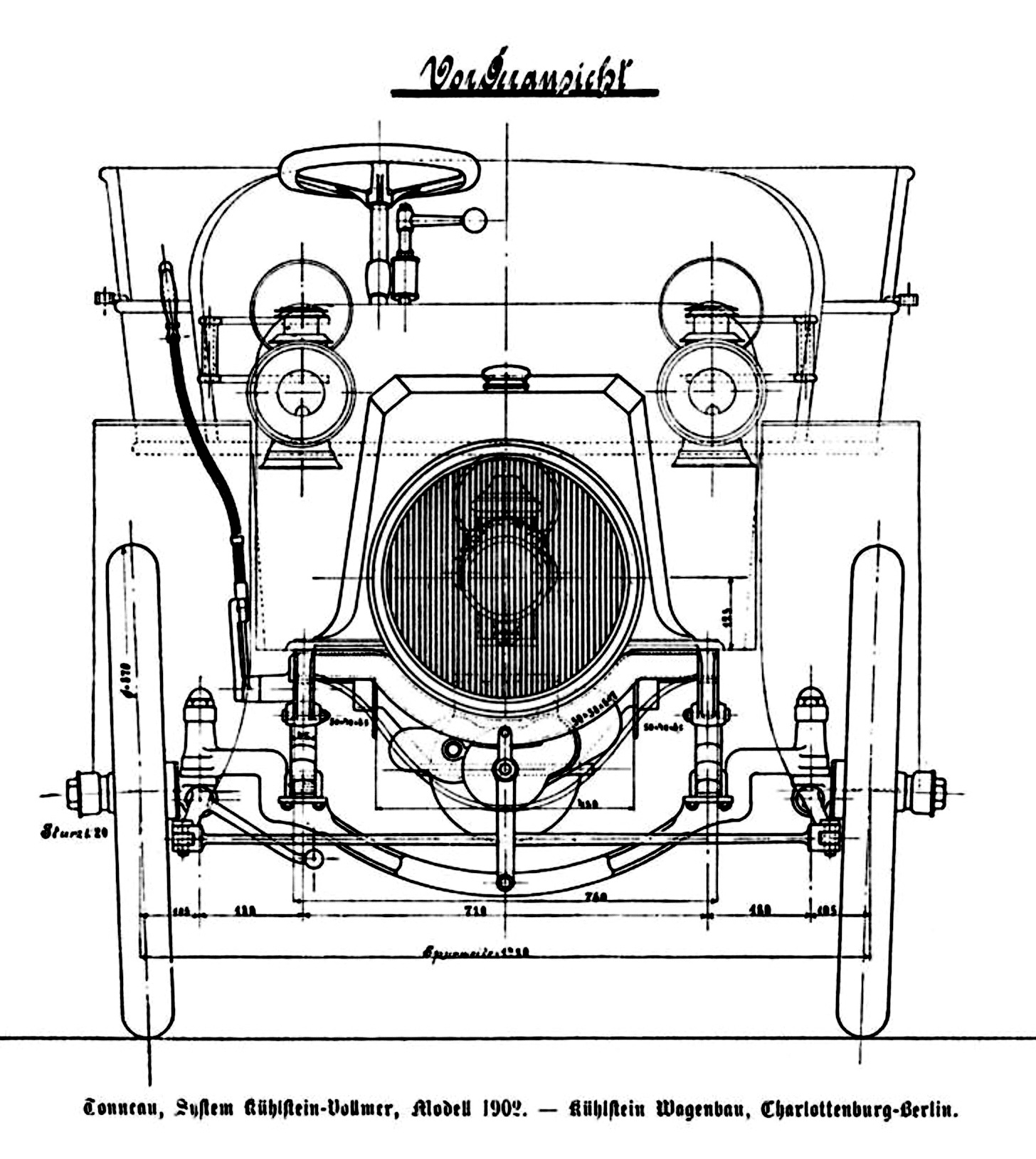
Kühlstein Tonneau 12 HP Front (1902).

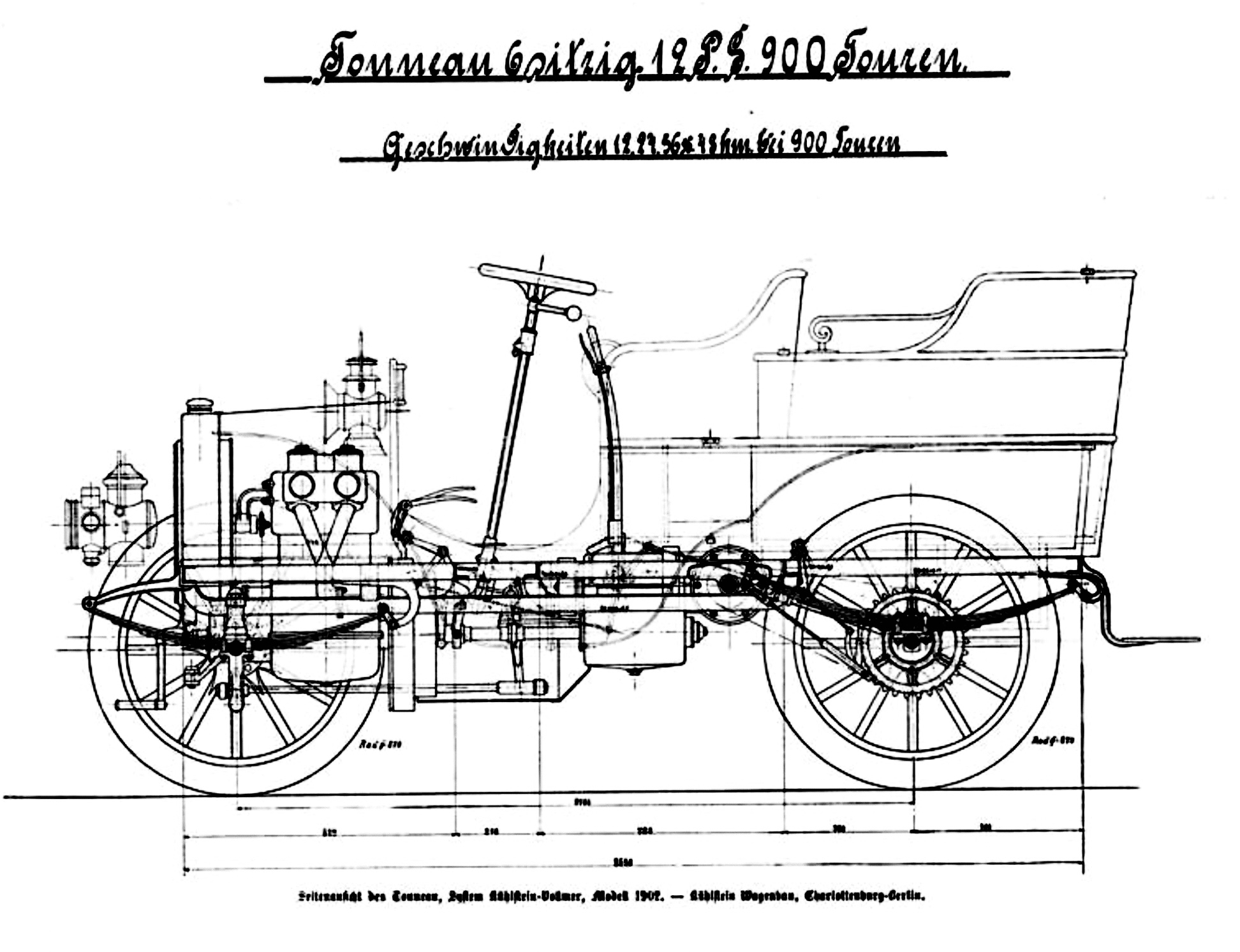
Kühlstein Tonneau 12 HP Side (1902).

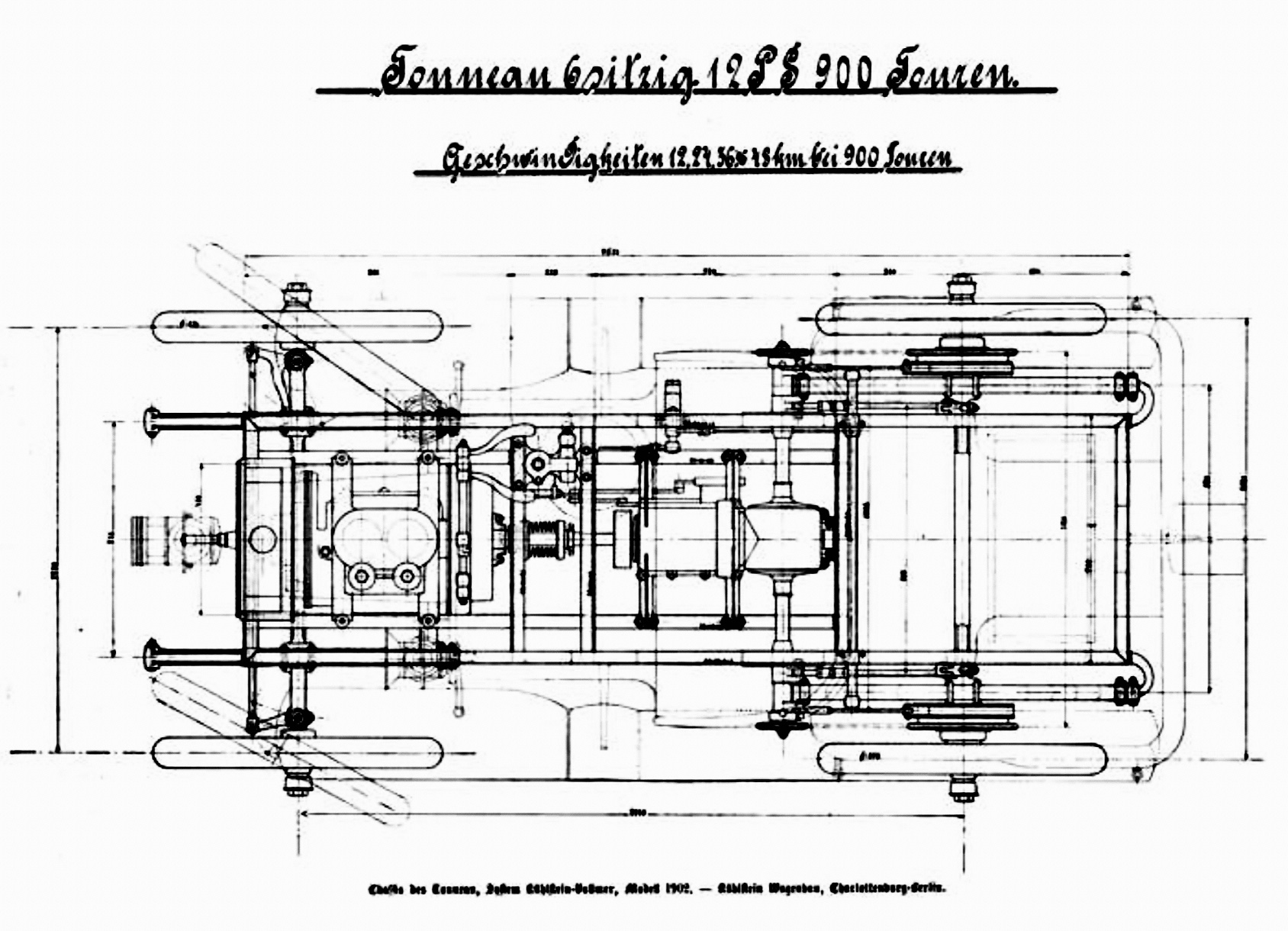
Kühlstein Tonneau 12 HP Top (1902).

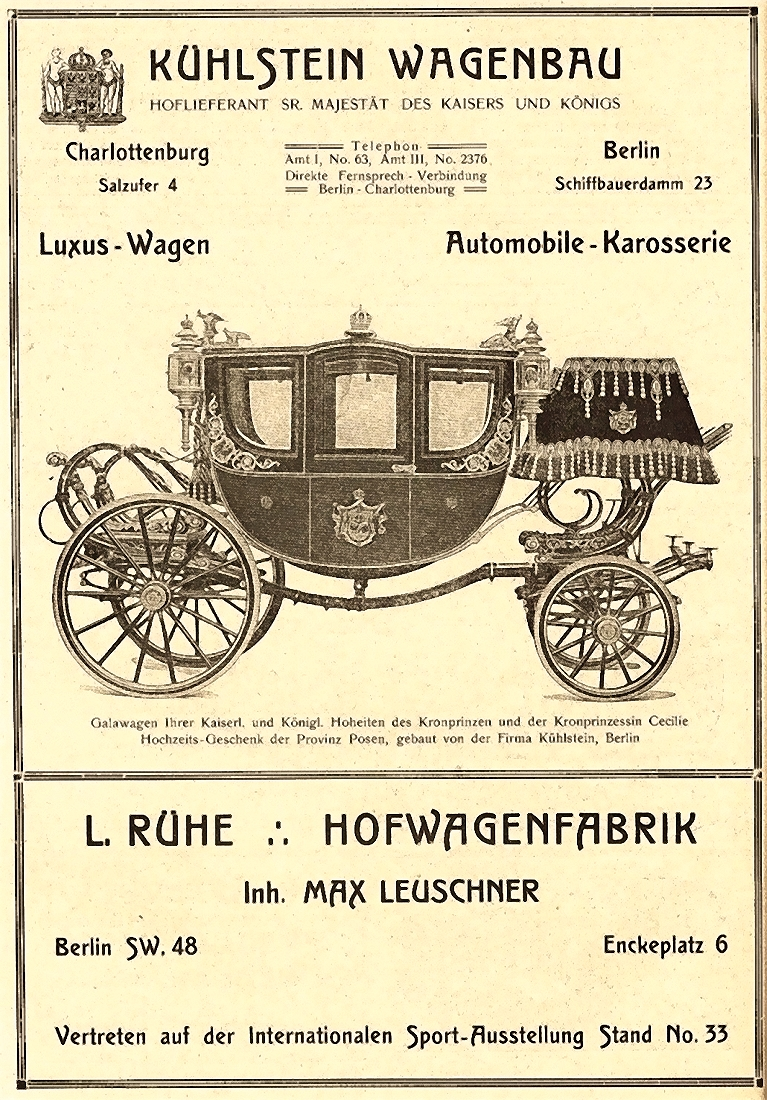
Poster after the merger of the companies L. Rühe and Kühlstein Wagenbau. (1907)

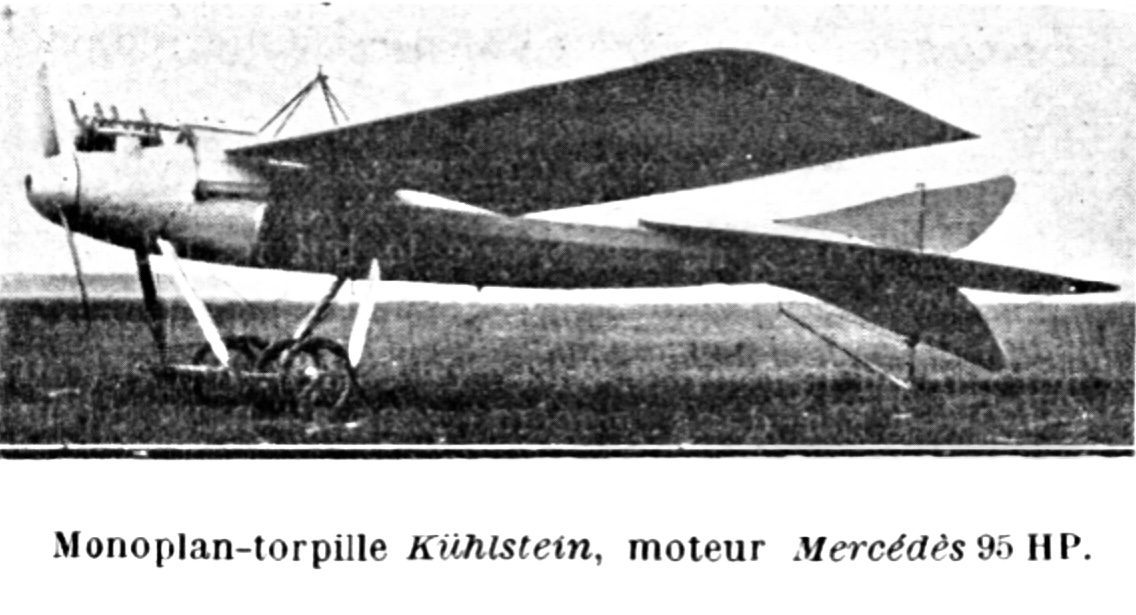
Kühlstein monoplane with Mercedes engine 95 hp (1912).

The Kühlstein Wagenbau in Berlin-Charlottenburg was a German coachbuilding company that produced electric cars from 1897 to 1902.

The factory was located at Salzufer number 4. Founded by Eduard Kühlstein (1804–1867) in 1833, the company initially manufactured carriages. After the death of the company founder in 1867, the company was continued by his son Ernst Kühlstein (1843–1900) and in 1884 by Max Leuschner (1856–1923) as technical director. In 1894, Max Leuschner left the company and Ernst Kühlstein had to run the company alone again. The vehicle shown at the Berlin Motor Exhibition was designed by Mr. Correns after Max Leuschner had left the company. In 1900, Mr. August Schulze (1848-1909) took over the management after Ernst Kühlstein had died. Schulze was also a member of the supervisory board of the newly founded Carburit Gesellschaft mbH, which served to supply fuel to automobiles.

With an electric car, Kühlstein was one of only four exhibitors at the first International Motor Show Germany (IAA) in Berlin in 1897. The other three exhibitors were Gottlieb Daimler, Carl Benz and Friedrich Lutzmann. It was precisely these exhibitors who demonstrated their vehicles in front of the Hotel Bristol (Berlin) on 30 September 1887. There, the Central European Motor Car Association was founded by 160 founding members. The members came from Germany, Austria-Hungary, Switzerland, Sweden and other countries. In 1898, Joseph Vollmer (1871-1955) started as chief engineer at Kühlstein Wagenbau. He designed the front axle with an engine, which could be installed in front of any horse-drawn carriage. These units were called "Avant Train" in France. Kühlstein offered these with a combustion engine or with an electric motor. Among the combustion engines, there was a two-cylinder engine with 2280 cc that produced 4 hp or a 6 hp two-cylinder engine with 3167 cc. In Berlin, in 1899, a number of taxi carriages were equipped with gasoline "Avant Train" by Kühlstein. Electric motors were available in the 2.4 kW, 3 kW or 7.4 kW levels. The electric motors came from AEG. With the Avant Trains, 5t trucks could reach 16 km/h, lighter passenger carriages achieved 25 km/h. The Mail-Coach of 1899 remained a one-off in postal service. The vehicle had a permissible payload of 1.26 t. This allowed the transport of up to 18 people, who could be accommodated in three three levels of seating. Two electric motors from Siemens & Halske, each with an output of 5.2 kW, were powered by a 3.2-ton battery. This battery enabled a range of 100 km. In 1899, the vehicle range consisted of gasoline-powered racing cars and touring cars in the passenger car sector. At the same time, two-seater and multi-seater electric vehicles were offered. For trucks, the program went up to 5t and buses up to 30 people were available electrically or gasoline-powered. The 5t truck had a wheelbase of 3300 mm. The total length was 5000 mm. It had a two-cylinder engine with 7125 cc with a bore of 140 mm and a stroke of 180 mm. The engine produced 10 hp. The gearbox had four gears. The maximum speeds in the gears were: 1st gear 3.5 km/h, 2nd gear 7 km/h, 3rd gear 10.5 km/h and 4th gear 14 km/h. A postcarriol, which had already been rebuilt in 1899 and received gold and silver medallions in 1900 at the Paris Exhibition, was not successful for the company. The test car with the number 5 was equipped with a two-cylinder gasoline engine and reached the following speeds in the three gears: 1 gear 5 km/h, 2nd gear 10 km/h and third gear 15 km/h.

In March 1900, the factory was hit by fire. Several vehicles destined for the Paris World's exhibition were severely damaged. A motor car, which was housed in another wing, suffered no damage. Some luxury cars and postal vehicles could not be saved for the Paris exhibition after the fire. The fire damage was estimated at 50,000 marks.

Electric vehicles continued to fade into the background and around 1900 Joseph Vollmer, Jenny Kühlstein (Ernst Kühlstein's daughter) and Erna von Rahmdohr filed patents for gasoline and alcohol engines.

In October 1900, Jenny Kühlstein married Lieutenant Wilhelm von Rahmdohr of the 2nd Pomeranian Regiment.

At the end of 1901 / beginning of 1902, the world's first sulphuric acid transport truck with a petrol engine was built for the chemical company Dr. E. ter Meer & Cie. The vehicle had a 17 hp two-cylinder engine and had a permissible gross weight of 7 t. The top speed was 13 km/h. The tank had a capacity of 3300 liters. The tonneau vehicle from 1902 was designed for up to 6 people and weighed 900 kg. It had a track width of 1280 mm at the front and 1320 mm at the rear. The wheelbase was 2650 mm. The tyres had a size of 870 x 90 at the front and rear. The two-cylinder engine produced 12 hp at 900 rpm. Thus, the possible speeds of the four-speed gearbox were: 1st gear 12 km/h, 2nd gear 24 km/h, 3rd gear 36 km/h and 4th gear 48 km/h. With brief turning up to 1200 revolutions per minute, the vehicle could reach 60 km/h. The water cooling system had a capacity of 12 liters. The tank capacity was 50 liters, enough for 300 km.

In 1906, the former technical director Leuschner bought the company. He combined them with his current company L. Rühe to form a joint enterprise. Some were vehicles of in-house design, others were Jeantaud cabs built under licence. The firm also built tractor units to replace horses for use with horse-drawn carriages. Later models were also known as Kühlstein-Vollmer. Production of these vehicles was absorbed by the Neue Automobil Gesellschaft (NAG) in 1902. Kühlstein continued manufacturing coachworks, e.g. for Horch cars.

The Kühlstein Wagenbau company established itself in aircraft construction and registered the pilot Bollmöller for the long-distance flight Berlin – Vienna in 1912 with its own Court monoplane. The wingspan of the aircraft designed by Engineer Max Court was 13500 mm. The total length was 9500 mm. The wings were 25 square meters in size. Three people were able to fly on the plane.

In 1914, the sons Walter and Ehrhard Leuschner were registered as co-owners. Max Leuschner died in 1923. In 1926, Kühlstein Wagenbau went bankrupt.
