= Ernst Friedberger =

German immunologist

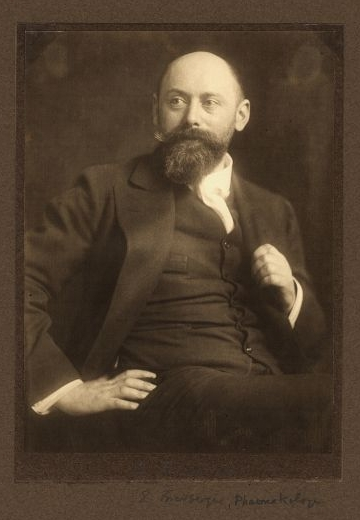
Ernst Freidberger

Ernst Friedberger (17 May 1875 – 25 January 1932) was a German immunologist and hygienist born in Giessen. He was of Jewish ancestry.

In 1899 he received his medical doctorate at the University of Giessen, and in 1901 became an assistant at the University of Königsberg, where in 1903 he was habilitated as a lecturer in hygiene. In 1908 he attained the directorship of experimental therapy at the Institute of Pharmacology at the University of Berlin. From 1915 to 1926 he was professor of hygiene at the University of Greifswald, and afterwards director of the Preußischen Forschungsinstituts für Hygiene und Immunitätslehre (Research Institute of Hygiene and Immunology) in Berlin-Dahlem.

Friedberger is remembered for his investigations of anaphylaxis. He demonstrated that the specific arrangement between antigen, antibody, and complement is accompanied by the manufacture of anaphylatoxin, a word he used for the poison that was supposed to be the same with the one produced in vivo during anaphylactic shock.

Later in his career, he dealt with various aspects of the immune system involving bacterial pathogens, with epidemiological research, and with hygiene issues concerning clothing, living quarters, etc.

== Written works ==
- Über Kriegsseuchen einst und jetzt, ihre Bekämpfung und Verhütung. 1917
- Zur Entwicklung der Hygiene im Weltkrieg, 1919 -- Development of hygiene during the World War.
- Untersuchungen über Wohnungsverhältnisse, insbes. über Kleinwohnungen und deren Mieter in Greifswald, 1923 -- Studies of housing conditions in Greifswald.
- Diphtherieepidemien der letzten Jahre, das Heilserum und die Schutzimpfung, 1931 -- Diphtheria epidemics in recent years, the serum and the vaccination.
