= Joseph Vollmer =

German automobile designer (1871–1955)

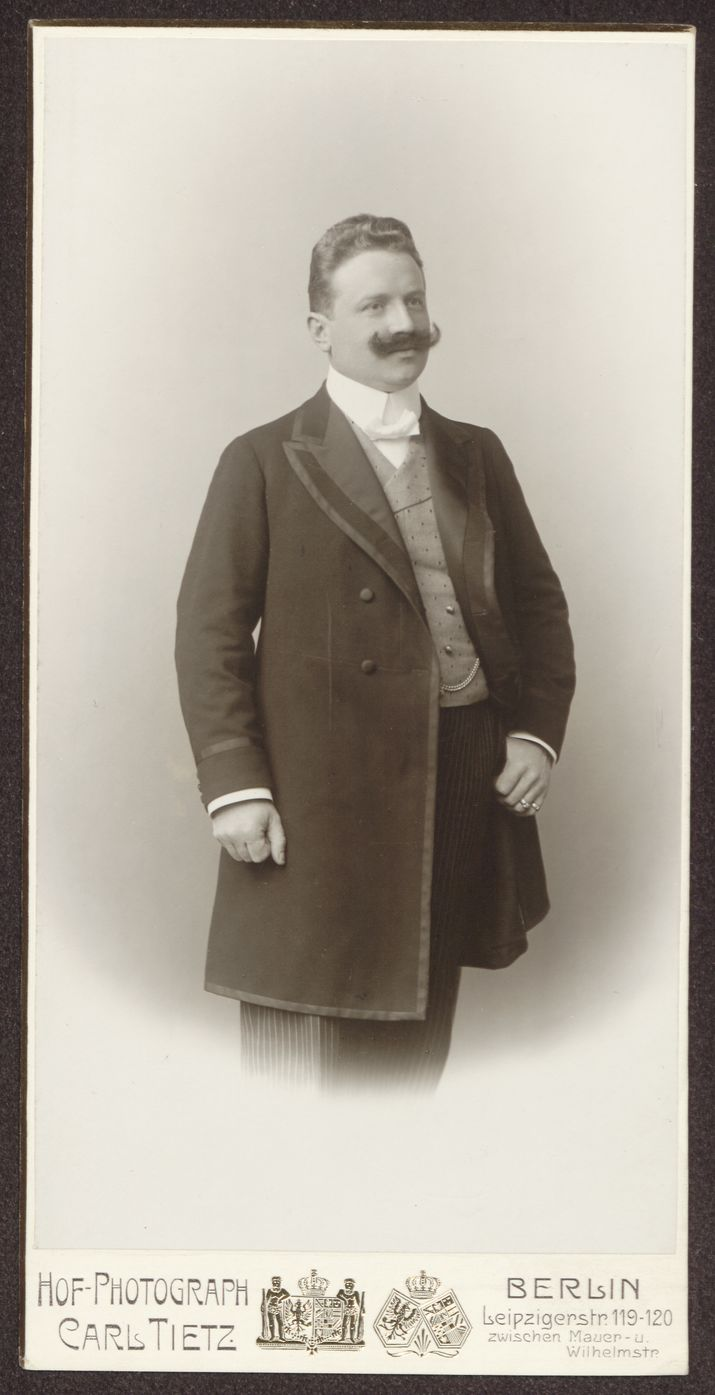
- Born: 13 February 1871; Baden-Baden, German Empire
- Died: 9 October 1955 (aged 84); Brunswick, West Germany
- Education: Technikum Mittweida, Sachsen
- Spouse: Hedwig Stöhr
- Engineering career
- Projects: A7V tank

Joseph Vollmer (1871–1955) was a German automobile designer and engineer and a pioneering tank designer. As chief designer for the German War Department's motor vehicle section, he designed the World War I German tanks A7V, K-Wagen, LK I and LK II.

== Early life ==
Born the son of a master locksmith, Vollmer grew up with three brothers in Baden-Baden. He attended the Municipal Trade School and after graduating in 1886 went to Cannstatt, to take up an apprenticeship as a mechanic in the Maschinenfabrik Esslingen. In 1894 he completed his engineering studies at the Technikum Mittweida in Saxony .

== Career ==
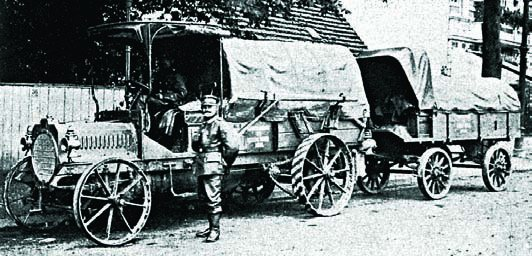
NAG truck of the Imperial German Army, 1905

Vollmer's career as an engineer and automobile pioneer began at Bergmann's automobile division in Gaggenau, beginning over 100 years of automobile construction in Gaggenau with the "Orient Express" automobile.

In 1897 Vollmer moved to the Kühlstein Wagenbau company of Berlin-Charlottenburg.

From 1901, he worked for AEG, where in 1902 he became head of their NAG subsidiary. All vehicles produced by AEG-NAG until 1906 were produced under Vollmer's direction and were designed by him, including the world's first truck, the DURCH tractor-trailer of 1903.

In 1905 Vollmer married Hedwig Stöhr, with whom he had two daughters; they celebrated their golden wedding anniversary in 1955.

Vollmer left NAG in 1906 and together with his friend Ernst Neuberg founded the Deutsche Automobil-Construktionsgesellschaft (DAC).

== World War I ==
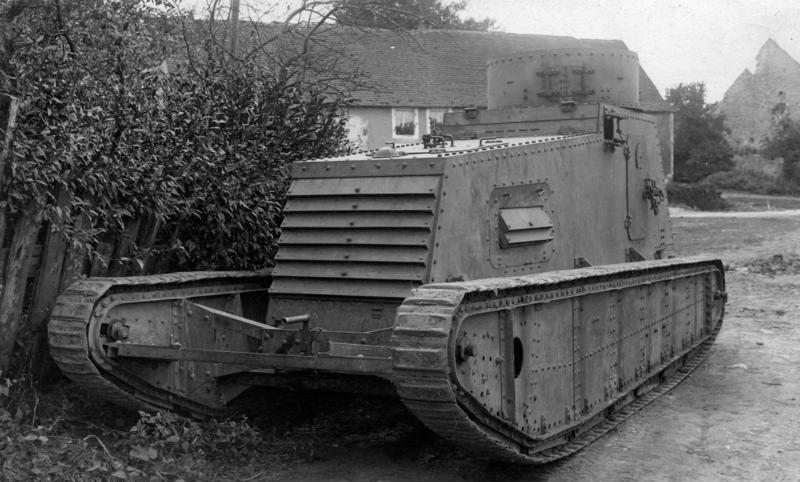
LK I

During World War I, Vollmer acquired the rank of captain, and as chief designer for the German War Department's motor vehicle section, he designed the World War I German tanks A7V, K-Wagen, LK I and LK II

== Post war ==
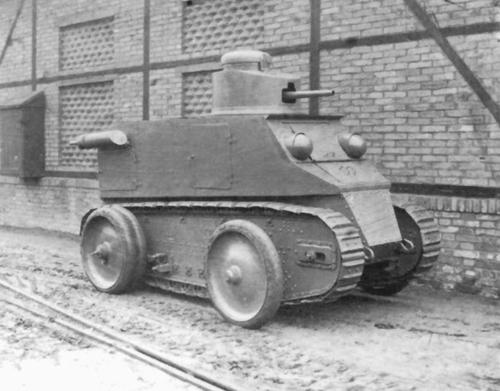
KH-50

Vollmer subsequently moved to Czechoslovakia, to join the Skoda company for whom he designed a wheel/track light tank, the KH-50 (Kolo-Housenka). This design had roadwheels mounted on the drive sprockets and jockey wheels behind them to support the tracks. Despite impressive specifications for the period - 13 mm armour, 37 mm turret-mounted armament, and a 50 hp engine capable of driving the tank at 8 miles per hour (13 km/h) (on tracks) and 22 miles per hour (35 km/h) (on wheels) - it was rejected by the Czech army.

The army was, however, impressed by the hybrid wheel/track concept and commissioned further studies, which resulted in the KH-60 (1928–29) and the KH-70 (1930). In these two designs the engine power was increased to 60 hp and 70 hp respectively and a better system was developed for switching between track and wheel use which allowed a change in less than 10 minutes.

2 KH-50 prototypes were built, one of which was later converted to a KH-60 and the other scrapped. Actual production included 2 KH-60s to the USSR and 1 KH-70 to Italy. The wheel-on-track concept was finally abandoned in 1934.

During the course of his career Vollmer was granted 450 German and foreign patents. His life's work was honored by being awarded the Bundesverdienstkreuz (Federal Cross of Merit).

Joseph Vollmer died after delivering a lecture in the Volkswagen factory in Brunswick on 9 October 1955.

In 2005 his hometown of Baden-Baden dedicated a bridge to him. The Joseph Vollmer Bridge is located between Europastraße/B500 and Schwarzwaldstraße. He had previously had a street in Ortenberg named after him: Joseph-Vollmer-Strasse.
