= 1951 East German referendum =

5 June 1951
- Are you against the remilitarisation of Germany and for the conclusion of a peace treaty with Germany in the year 1951?

Results
Choice	Votes	%
Yes	13,034,477	95.98%
No	546,622	4.02%
Valid votes	13,581,099	99.72%
Invalid or blank votes	37,625	0.28%
Total votes	13,618,724	100.00%
Registered voters/turnout	13,700,000	99.41%

A referendum on militarisation and peace was held in East Germany on 5 June 1951. Voters were asked "Are you against the remilitarisation of Germany and for the conclusion of a peace treaty with Germany in the year 1951?". It was approved by 95.98% of voters.

== Results ==
Choice	Votes	%
For	13,034,477	95.98
Against	546,622	4.02
Invalid/blank votes	37,625	–
Total	13,618,724	100
Registered voters/turnout	13,700,000	99.42
Source: Direct Democracy
