= Congregations Law =

The Congregations Law of 1875 is a legislative bill of the Kulturkampf period that abolished religious orders, stopped state subsidies to the Catholic Church, and removed religious protections from the Prussian constitution. It was based on similar legislation that had been voted in France a few years earlier.

Sixty-seven religious houses were dissolved within six months of the law's implementation and by June 1877, 189 had been suppressed. In the end, almost 3,000 religious men and women were directly affected by the Congregations Law, including the five drowned Franciscan nuns who were famously memorialized in Gerard Manley Hopkins’ “The Wreck of the Deutschland”.

However, were the law to have been implemented suddenly and completely, the Prussian government feared that up to 6,000 former nuns would be homeless and unable to find marriage or employment – a social problem even less desirable to the authoritarian state than the political influence of Catholicism.

As it happened, implementing the law in the diocese of Hildesheim in the Province of Hanover caused the closure of 36 schools run by religious congregations, requiring the state to provide education for 3,000 children. The costs were borne by the local community, a situation which was repeated around Prussia, making the laws broadly unpopular. Further, Catholic religious institutions did not comply independently with the new law, but had to be ordered individually, a process which slowed the implementation of the law significantly while raising the costs.

When a religious house was seized, more often than not all valuables had been hidden away, and sometimes it was found that the ownership of the property had been transferred into the name of a loyal Catholic layman, so that the law would not apply. Though it caused widespread hardship, the Congregations Law failed to advance the goals of the Kulturkampf.
