= Ulrich Hahnen =

German politician (1952–2016)

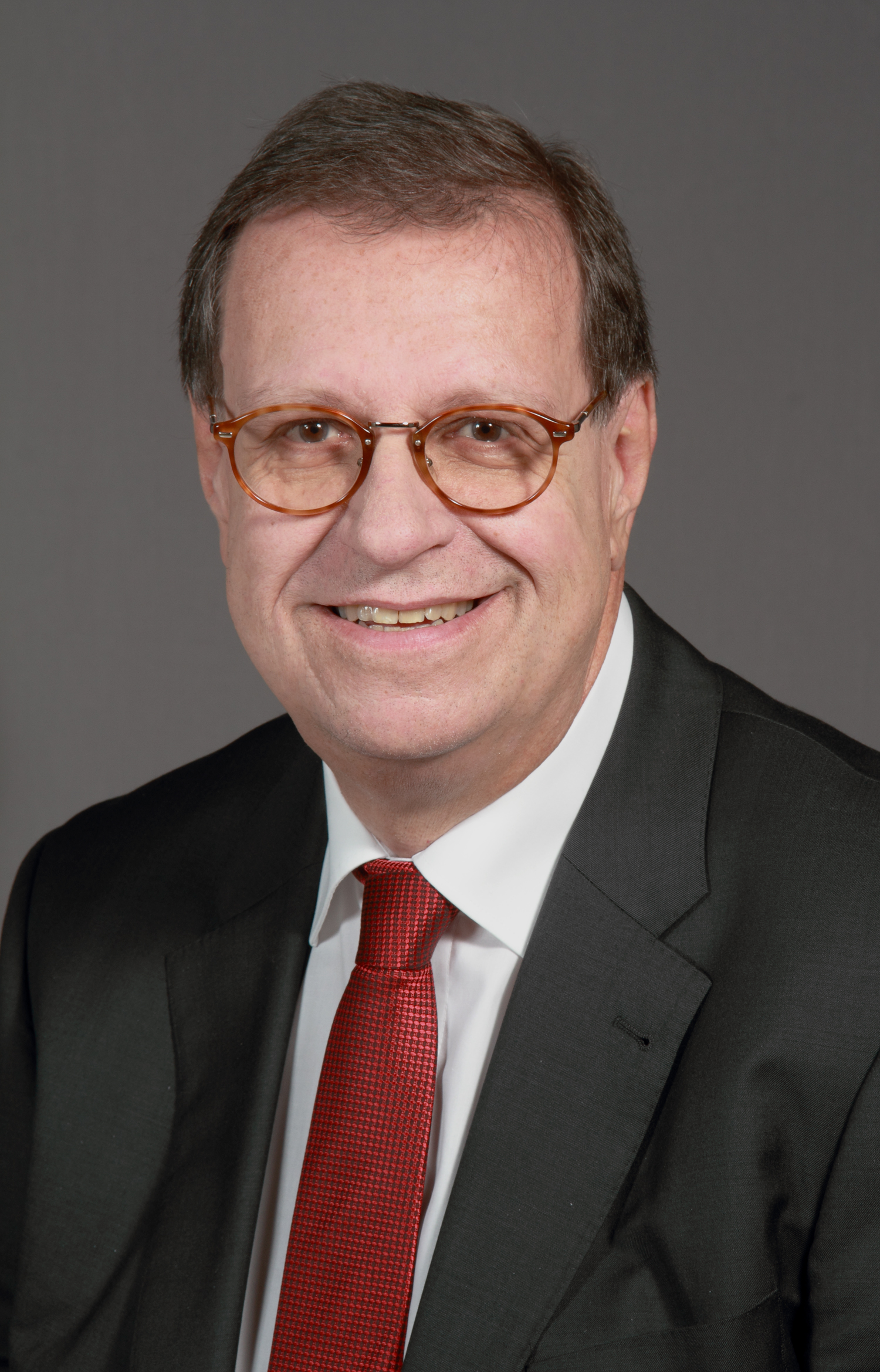
Hahnen in November 2013.

Ulrich Hahnen (10 May 1952 – 10 January 2016) was a German politician for the Social Democratic Party (SPD). He served as a deputy of the Landtag of North Rhine-Westphalia from 2010 until his death. In 1994, he became a member of the City Council of Krefeld, North Rhine-Westphalia.

Hahnen died from cancer on 10 January 2016 at the age of 63.
