= Treaty on Relations between the USSR and the GDR =

Agreement to station Soviet Army troops in East Germany

The Treaty on Relations Between the USSR and GDR was a treaty between the Soviet Union and German Democratic Republic, commonly known as East Germany, signed on 20 September 1955. The treaty became the legal basis for the Group of Soviet Forces in Germany, and its successor, the Western Group of Forces to maintain its presence in Germany following the end of the Soviet occupation.

== History ==
Following the German Instrument of Surrender on 8 May 1945, which formally ended the Second World War in Europe, Germany was split into four occupation zones. The French, American, and British zones would eventually merge to become the Federal Republic of Germany, or West Germany, while the Soviet zone, due to the ensuing Cold War, would eventually become the German Democratic Republic, or East Germany. The Red Army maintained a significant force in its occupation territory for the four years following the end of the war, mostly as a bulwark against the armies of the West stationed in Western Europe, which became increasingly hostile towards each other as the Cold War escalated.

On 7 October 1949, the German Democratic Republic was officially established. The Soviet Union, realizing that a war against NATO would likely be fought in Central Europe, and particularly in Germany, understood that it would need to continue maintaining a large presence in East Germany.

On 9 May 1955, four months before the signing of the treaty, West Germany joined NATO. This was seen as a largely hostile move against the Soviet Union, and consequently the Soviet Union founded its own defense organisation, the Warsaw Pact, along with East Germany, Bulgaria, Czechoslovakia, Hungary, Poland, Romania, and Albania, on 14 May 1955, in anticipation of the remilitarized West Germany, stating that "a remilitarized Western Germany and the integration of the latter in the North-Atlantic bloc [...] increase the danger of another war and constitutes a threat to the national security of the peaceable states; [...] in these circumstances the peaceable European states must take the necessary measures to safeguard their security".

== The treaty ==
The treaty was officially signed and enacted on 20 September 1955. Among its stipulations were an agreement that "the Soviet troops temporarily stationed in the GDR with the consent of its government do not interfere in the country’s domestic affairs and social and political life." Also stated was that the GDR was to continue exercising protection and control of its borders, but until a further agreement was reached, the Soviet Army Command in Germany was to "control the movement of American, French, and British personnel and cargoes entering and exiting West Berlin. This provision may have been added in case the Soviet Union wished to try to force the Western Allies to withdraw from West Berlin by cutting off the railways and roads leading in from East Germany, as they tried, and failed to do in 1948–49 during the Berlin Airlift, in response to the Western Allies issuing a new currency into their sector, further destabilizing the East German economy.

Nikita Khrushchev, the First Secretary of the Communist Party of the Soviet Union from 1953 to 1964, was said to have famously remarked, "Berlin is the testicles of the West. When I want to make the West scream, I squeeze Berlin!"

== Aftermath ==
Towards the end of the 1980s, the Soviet Union and Warsaw Pact States began to splinter. A series of protests in East Germany known as the Peaceful Revolution occurred and as a result, on 18 March 1990, East Germany's first free election occurred. The newly formed government began a series of negotiations with West Germany, ultimately resulting in reunification.

The Soviet Army would maintain varying degrees of troops in East Germany, and the territory of the former GDR until the Dissolution of the Soviet Union in 1991, when its successor, the Russian Federation would take over. The forces in Germany were renamed the Western Group of Forces in 1989, and halted all maneuvers and military exercises by 1993, due to the reduction of tensions with the West following the period of Perestroika in the 1980s, and finally the Fall of the Soviet Union and the Warsaw pact, and a more liberal form of government being established. All Russian troops would leave Germany by 1994, in what has been called the largest peaceful movement of troops in history.
