= Sonia Seymour Mikich =

German TV journalist (born 1951)

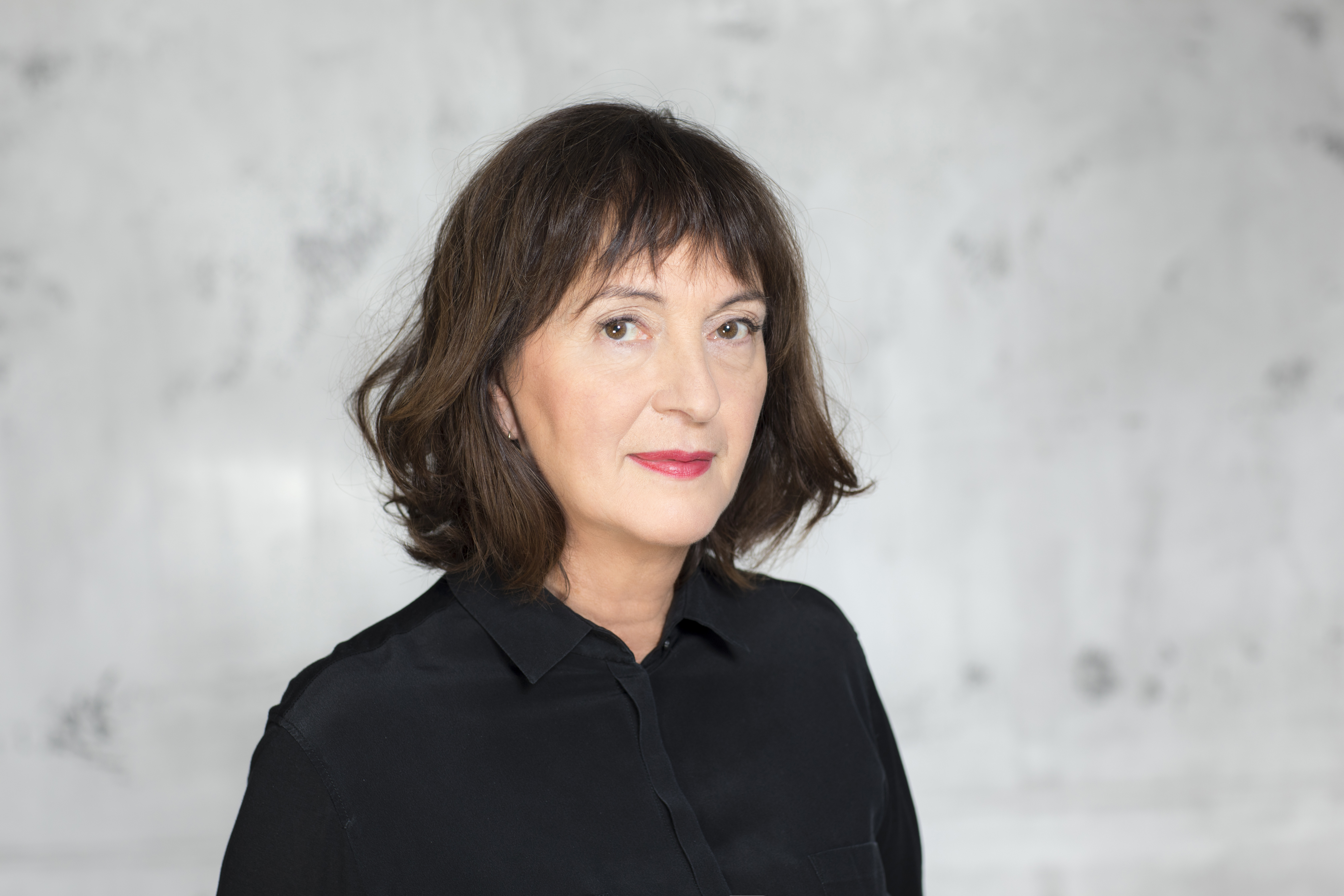
- Mikich in 2017
- Born: 13 July 1951 (age 75); Oxford, England
- Education: RWTH Aachen Institute of Technology
- Occupation: TV journalist
- Awards: Order of Merit of the Federal Republic of Germany

Sonia Seymour Mikich (born 13 July 1951 in Oxford) is a German TV journalist.

== Education ==
After studying political sciences, sociology, and philosophy from 1972 to 1979 at the RWTH Aachen University. She worked as a research associate with the institute's Arnold-Gehlen Research Group. In 1985 she received a scholarship from the German Marshall Fund.

== Career ==
- Since 1984 editor and reporter for the WDR's foreign TV broadcasting group
- 1992–1998 – Correspondent in Moscow, since 1995 as first woman to serve as head of the broadcasting studio
- 1998–2001 – Head of the ARD studio in Paris
- Since 2002 chief editor and presenter of the ARD's Monitor newsmagazine
- Since 2004 head of the ARD/WDR documentary magazine Die story, WDR TV, Cologne
- Since 2012 moderator of weekly talk show Presseclub
- 2014–2018 – Editor-in-Chief, WDR TV, Cologne

Her work as chronicler of the First Chechen War in Moscow was awarded in 1998 with the Bundesverdienstkreuz.

On 17 November 2016, Seymour Mikich and Der Spiegel editor-in-chief Klaus Brinkbäumer conducted the only TV interview with President Barack Obama on his last official trip to Germany.

== Other activities ==
- Civis Media Foundation, Member of the advisory board (since 2013)

== Filmography ==
- 1993, Mordsliebe Moskau, WDR 3
- 1993, Brudermord – Putsch 93, ARD
- 1993, Davonfliegen wie Ikarus – Aussteiger im neuen Rußland, WDR
- 1995, Mascha, 15, hat viele Kerle... Jugend in Rußland, WDR
- (mit Telestar 1996 ausgezeichnet)
- 1995, Der Gotteskrieger und die Kellerfrauen, ARD
- 1996, Das Duell – Jelzin gegen Sjuganow, ARD
- 1996, Mein Moskau, WDR
- 1996, Die Krönung – Portrait Boris Jelzin zur Wiederwahl, ARD
- 1996, Zar Boris und die Brandstifter – Tschetschenienkrieg und die Ursachen, ARD
- 1997, Brotlos, aber hochgerüstet – Armee in der Krise, NDR
- 1997, Polarkreis 3. Klasse, WDR
- 1997, Moskau Neon, Moskau Samt – Abschied, ARD
- 1998, Gralssucher und Troubadoure – Pyrenäenreise, ARD
- 1999, Die Sängerin – Korsikareise, ARD
- 2000, Sturm und Licht, Bretagnereise, ARD
- 2000, Spur des Kondor, Peru-Reise, ARD
- 2000, Bretagne-Reise, WDR
- 2000, Korsika-Reise, WDR
- 2000, Flug in den Tod – Concorde-Absturz, ARD
- 2001, Provence auf Nebenwegen, ARD
- 2001, Provence: blau-weiss-roter Traum, ARD

== Books ==
Der Wille zum Glück Planet Moskau – Geschichten aus dem neuen Russland
