= Porsche Club Hohensyburg =

The Porsche Club Hohensyburg is an organization of Porsche enthusiasts in Germany. It was founded on May 26, 1952, in Westphalia and was, when created, the first Porsche enthusiasts' organization in the world.
