= Monika Stolz =

German politician

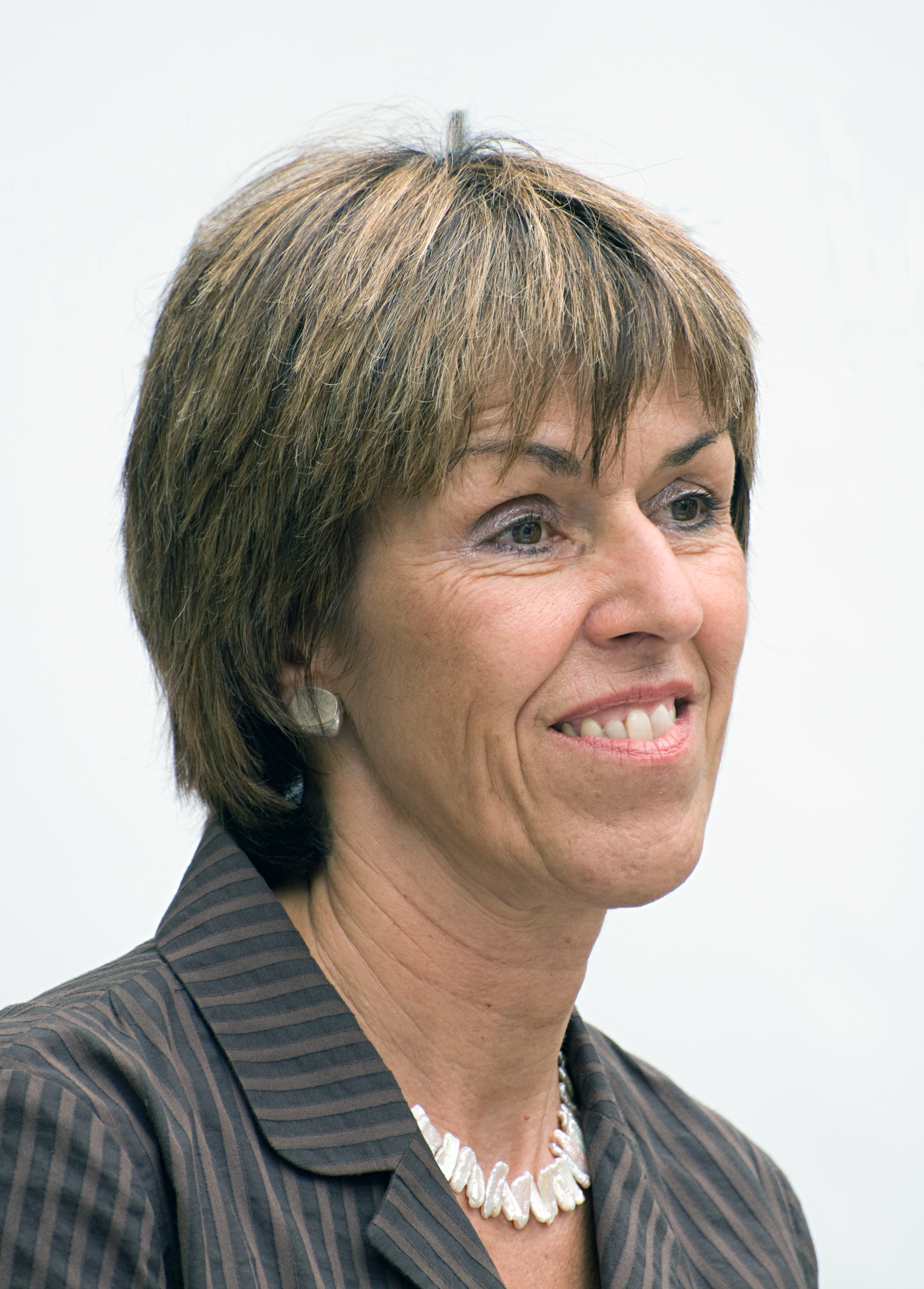

Minister of Work, Social Order, Women and the Elderly of Baden-Württemberg
- In office 2006–2011
- Preceded by: Andreas Renner
- Succeeded by: Katrin Altpeter

Personal details
- Born: March 24, 1951 (age 75) Worms, Rhineland-Palatinate
- Party: Christian Democratic Union (CDU)
- Education: University of Fribourg; University of Bonn
- Occupation: Researcher; Doctor
- Website: www.dr-monika-stolz.de

Monika Stolz (born March 24, 1951) is a German politician for the Christian Democratic Union (CDU) in Baden-Württemberg and was Minister of Work, Social Order, Women and the Elderly from 2006 to 2011.

== Biography ==
After obtaining her Abitur, she studied economic science at the University of Freiburg, from where she graduated in 1974. During the next three years, she worked as a research assistant at the Konrad Adenauer Foundation.

In 1977, she took higher education in medicine, at the universities of Gießen, Würzburg and Bonn, where she obtained her degree in 1983. She took her doctorate in 1985, and became a doctor at the end of the same year.

She is married, mother of four children, and a practising Roman Catholic and member of the Central Committee of German Catholics.

== Political life ==
She was elected to the municipal council of Ulm in 1989. Two years later she became the head of the elected group of the CDU, which she occupied until 1999. Two years later, she entered the Landtag of Baden-Württemberg, where she took the vice-presidency of her party in 2004.

Named political secretary of state of regional ministers for education by Helmut Rau in 2005, Monika Stolz was chosen as Minister of Work, Social Order, Women and the Elderly by Günther Oettinger on February 1, 2006. On February 10, 2010, Stefan Mappus was elected Minister-President of Baden-Württemberg, and asked that all ministers continue their roles.

At the Landtagswahl 2011 she was elected directly to the Landtag with 38.6% of the votes. The coalition of CDU and FDP lost its majority to Alliance '90/The Greens and the SPD. Therefore, Stolz was succeeded as Minister by Katrin Altpeter (SPD).

== See also ==
- Politics of Germany
