= 1865 in Germany =

- Decades: 1840s; 1850s; 1860s; 1870s; 1880s
- See also: Other events of 1865; History of Germany • Timeline • Years

Events from the year 1865 in Germany.

== Incumbents ==
- King of Bavaria – Ludwig II of Bavaria
- Hamburg – Friedrich Sieveking, First Burgomaster of Hamburg (1861–1862; 1865; and again 1868)
- Kingdom of Hanover – George (1851–1866)
- Kingdom of Prussia –
  - Monarch – Wilhelm I (1861–1888)
  - Minister President - Otto von Bismarck (1862–1873)
- Kingdom of Saxony – Johann (1854–1873)
- Kingdom of Württemberg – Karl (1864–1891)

== Events ==
- February 8 & March 8 – Gregor Mendel reads his paper on Experiments on Plant Hybridization at two meetings of the Natural History Society of Brünn in Moravia, subsequently taken to be the origin of the theory of Mendelian inheritance.
- April 6 – German chemicals producer Badische Anilin- und Sodafabrik (BASF) is founded in Mannheim.
- April 21 – German Chemicals producer BASF moves its headquarters and factories from Mannheim, to the Hemshof District of Ludwigshafen
- The General German Cigar Workers Society ("Allgemeiner Deutsche Cigarrenarbeiter-Verein"), established in Leipzig in 1865, was the first centrally organized union in Germany.

== Births ==
- January 22 – Friedrich Paschen (died 1947), German physicist
- February 17 – Ernst Troeltsch, German theologian (d. 1923 )
- March 30 – Heinrich Rubens, German physicist (d. 1922 )
- April 9
  - Erich Ludendorff, German general (d. 1937 )
  - Charles Proteus Steinmetz, German-American engineer, electrician (d. 1923 )
- June 19 – Alfred Hugenberg, German businessman, politician (d. 1951 )
- June 21 – Otto Frank (physiologist), German doctor (d. 1944 )

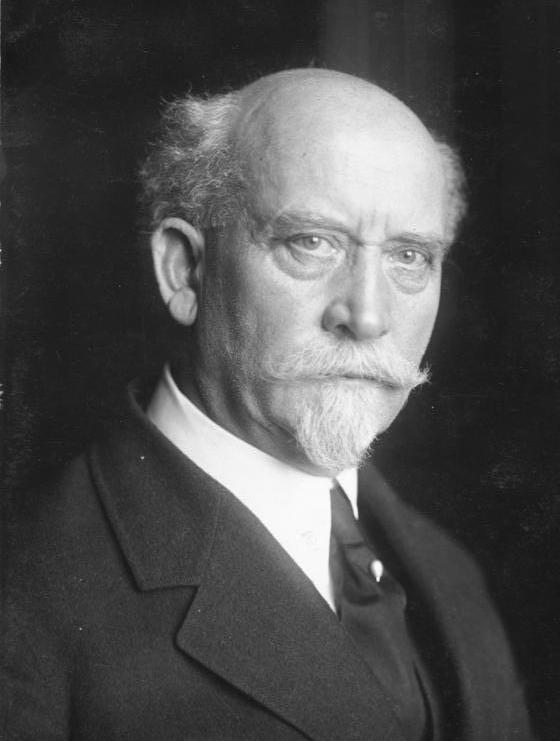
Philipp Scheidemann

- July 26 – Philipp Scheidemann, Chancellor of Germany (d. 1939)
- December 8 – Rüdiger von der Goltz, German general (d. 1946 )
- December 23 – Albrecht, Duke of Württemberg, German field marshal (d. 1939 )
- Gustav Müller - German murderer and self-confessed serial killer

== Deaths ==
- August 26 – Johann Franz Encke (born 1791), German astronomer
- August 29 – Robert Remak, German embryologist, physiologist and neurologist (b. 1815)
