= Behlmer =

Behlmer is a surname. Notable people with the surname include:

- Anna Behlmer, American film and television re-recording mixer
- Rudy Behlmer (1926–2019), American film historian and writer

== See also ==
- Behmer
