= 1865 =

1865 in various calendars
- Gregorian calendar: 1865; MDCCCLXV
- Ab urbe condita: 2618
- Armenian calendar: 1314; ԹՎ ՌՅԺԴ
- Assyrian calendar: 6615
- Baháʼí calendar: 21–22
- Balinese saka calendar: 1786–1787
- Bengali calendar: 1271–1272
- Berber calendar: 2815
- British Regnal year: 28 Vict. 1 – 29 Vict. 1
- Buddhist calendar: 2409
- Burmese calendar: 1227
- Byzantine calendar: 7373–7374
- Chinese calendar: 甲子年 (Wood Rat); 4562 or 4355 — to — 乙丑年 (Wood Ox); 4563 or 4356
- Coptic calendar: 1581–1582
- Discordian calendar: 3031
- Ethiopian calendar: 1857–1858
- Hebrew calendar: 5625–5626
- Hindu calendars
- Vikram Samvat: 1921–1922
- Shaka Samvat: 1786–1787
- Kali Yuga: 4965–4966
- Holocene calendar: 11865
- Igbo calendar: 865–866
- Iranian calendar: 1243–1244
- Islamic calendar: 1281–1282
- Japanese calendar: Genji 2 / Keiō 1 (慶応元年)
- Javanese calendar: 1793–1794
- Julian calendar: Gregorian minus 12 days
- Korean calendar: 4198
- Minguo calendar: 47 before ROC 民前47年
- Nanakshahi calendar: 397
- Thai solar calendar: 2407–2408
- Tibetan calendar: ཤིང་ཕོ་བྱི་བ་ལོ་ (male Wood-Rat); 1991 or 1610 or 838 — to — ཤིང་མོ་གླང་ལོ་ (female Wood-Ox); 1992 or 1611 or 839

1865 (MDCCCLXV) was a common year starting on Sunday of the Gregorian calendar and a common year starting on Friday of the Julian calendar, the 1865th year of the Common Era (CE) and Anno Domini (AD) designations, the 865th year of the 2nd millennium, the 65th year of the 19th century, and the 6th year of the 1860s decade. As of the start of 1865, the Gregorian calendar was 12 days ahead of the Julian calendar, which remained in localized use until 1923.

== Events ==
=== January ===
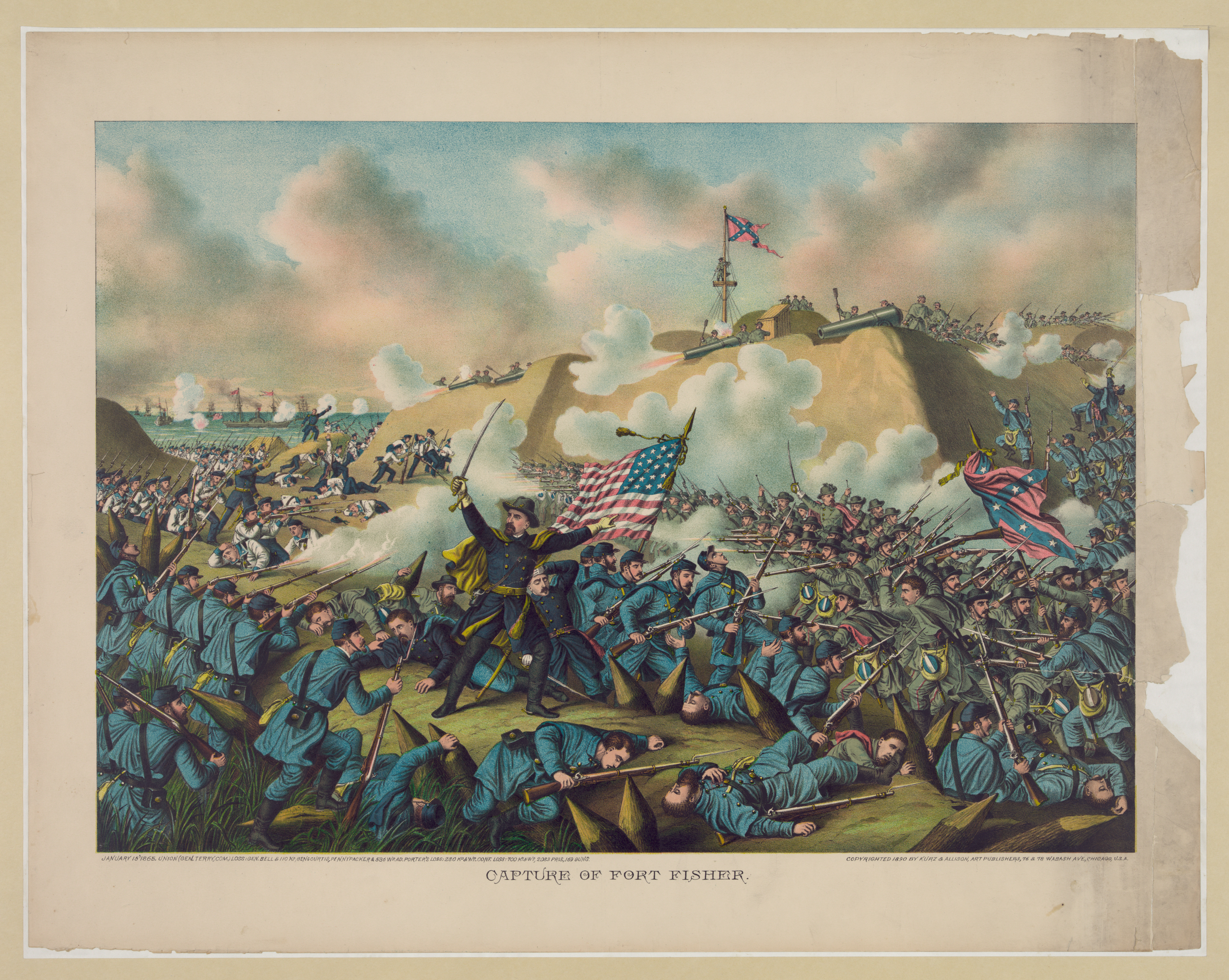
January 15: Union captures Fort Fisher.

- January 4 – The New York Stock Exchange opens its first permanent headquarters at 10-12 Broad near Wall Street, in New York City.
- January 13 – American Civil War: Second Battle of Fort Fisher – Union forces launch a major amphibious assault against the last seaport held by the Confederates, Fort Fisher, North Carolina.
- January 15 – American Civil War: Union forces capture Fort Fisher.
- January 31
  - The Thirteenth Amendment to the United States Constitution (conditional prohibition of slavery and involuntary servitude) passes narrowly, in the House of Representatives.
  - American Civil War: Confederate General Robert E. Lee becomes general-in-chief.

=== February ===
- February 3 – American Civil War: Hampton Roads Conference: Union and Confederate leaders discuss peace terms.
- February 6 – The municipal administration of Finland is established.
- February 8 & March 8 – Gregor Mendel reads his paper on Experiments on Plant Hybridization at two meetings of the Natural History Society of Brünn in Moravia, subsequently taken to be the origin of the theory of Mendelian inheritance.
- February 21 – John Deere receives a United States patent for ploughs.
- February 22 – Tennessee adopts a new constitution that abolishes slavery.
- February – American Civil War: Columbia, South Carolina burns, as Confederate forces flee from advancing Union forces.

=== March ===
- March 3 – The U.S. Congress authorizes formation of the Bureau of Refugees, Freedmen and Abandoned Lands.
- March 4 – Washington College and Jefferson College are merged to form Washington & Jefferson College in the United States.
- March 13 – American Civil War: The Confederate States of America agrees to the use of African American troops.
- March 18 – American Civil War: The Congress of the Confederate States of America adjourns for the last time.
- March 19–21 – American Civil War : Battle of Bentonville: Union troops compel Confederate forces to retreat from Four Oaks, North Carolina.
- March 25
  - The Claywater Meteorite explodes just before reaching ground level in Vernon County, Wisconsin; fragments having a combined mass of 1.5 kg (3.3 lb) are recovered.
  - American Civil War: In Virginia, Confederate forces capture Fort Stedman from the Union, although it is retaken the same day. Lee's army suffers heavy casualties: about 2,900, including 1,000 captured in the Union counterattack. Confederate positions are weakened. After the battle, Lee's defeat is only a matter of time.
- March – Hamm's Brewery opens in St. Paul, Minnesota.

=== April ===
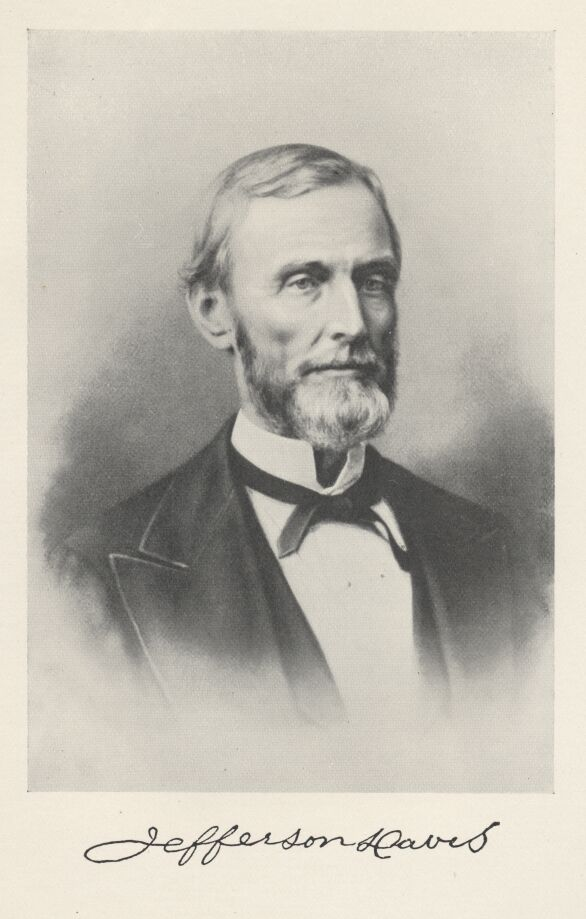
April 2: Jefferson Davis.

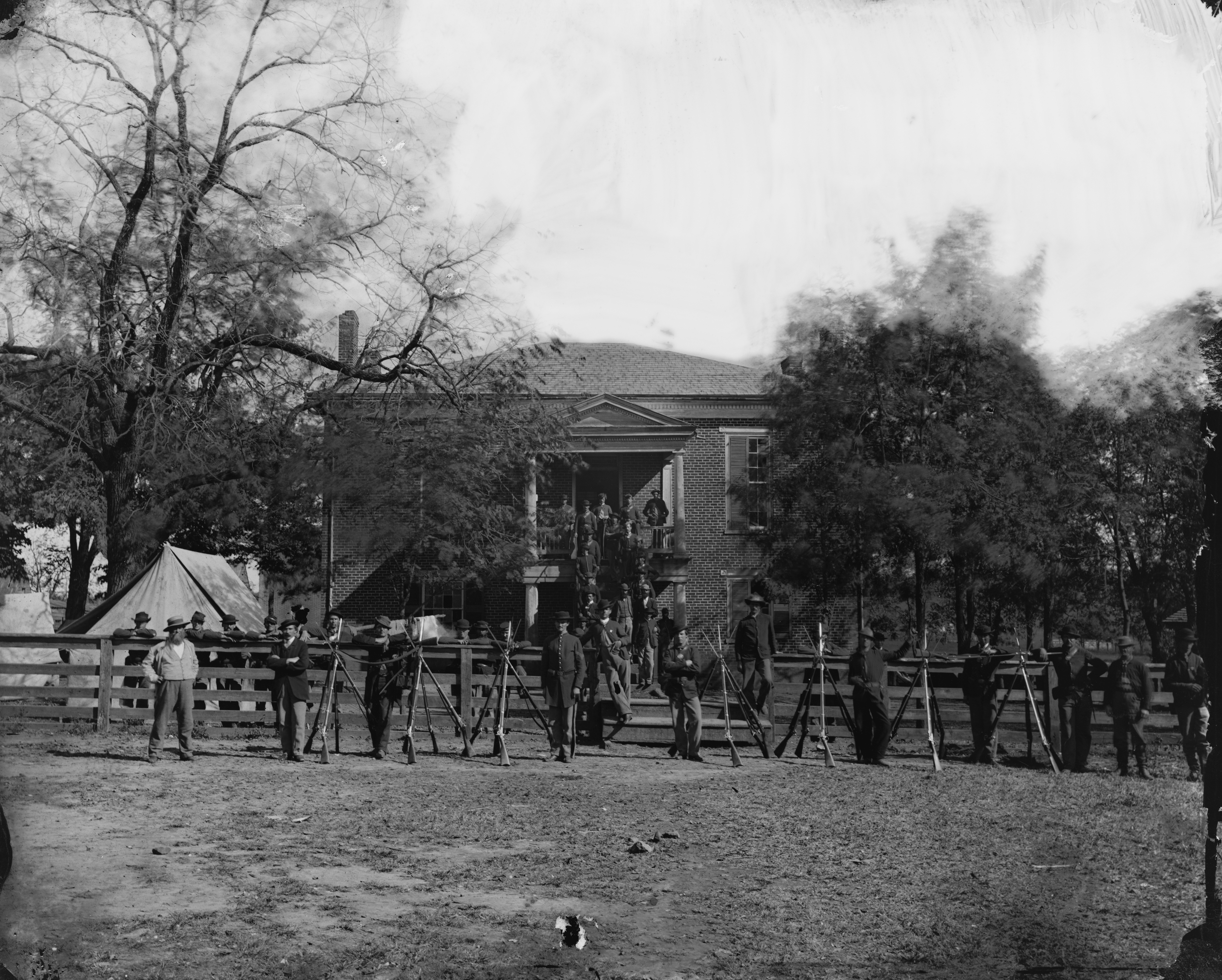
April 9: Appomattox Court House.

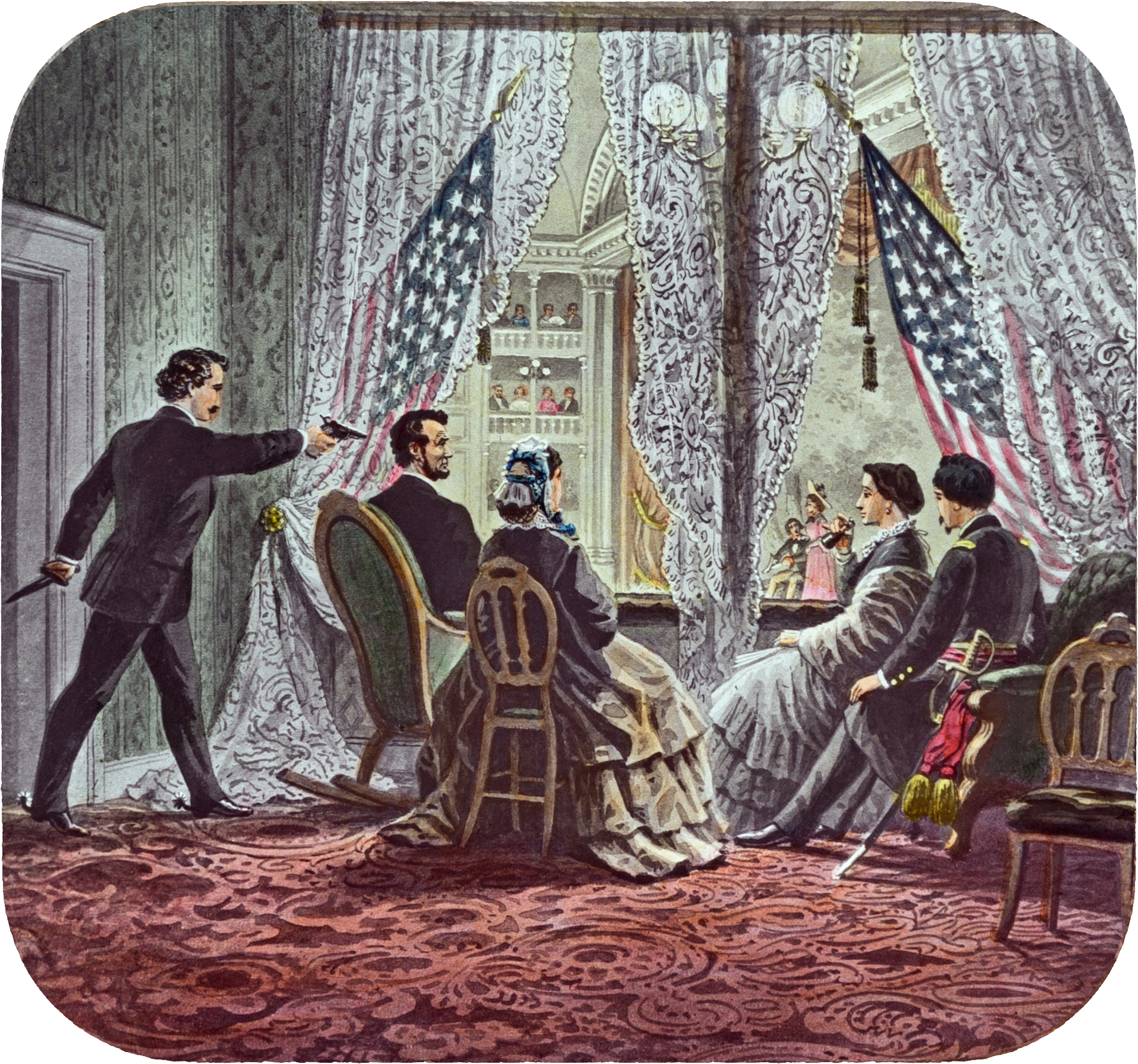
April 14: Lincoln shot.

- April 1 – American Civil War – Battle of Five Forks: In Petersburg, Virginia, Confederate General Robert E. Lee begins his final offensive.
- April 2 – American Civil War: Confederate President Jefferson Davis and most of his Cabinet flee the Confederate capital of Richmond, Virginia, which is taken by Union troops the next day.
- April 6 – German chemicals producer Badische Anilin- und Sodafabrik (BASF) is founded in Mannheim.
- April 9 – American Civil War: Confederate States Army General Robert E. Lee surrenders to Union Army General Ulysses S. Grant at Appomattox Court House, effectively ending the war.
- April 14
  - Assassination of Abraham Lincoln: President of the United States Abraham Lincoln is shot while attending an evening performance of the farce Our American Cousin at Ford's Theatre in Washington, D.C., by actor and Confederate sympathizer John Wilkes Booth.
  - United States Secretary of State William H. Seward and his family are attacked in his home, by Lewis Powell.
- April 15 – President Lincoln dies early this morning from his gunshot wound, aged 56. Vice President Andrew Johnson becomes the 17th president of the United States upon Lincoln's death.
- April 18 – Confederate President Jefferson Davis and his entire cabinet arrive in Charlotte, North Carolina, with a contingent of 1,000 soldiers.
- April 21 – German chemicals producer BASF moves its headquarters and factories from Mannheim, to the Hemshof District of Ludwigshafen.
- April 26
  - American Civil War: Confederate General Joseph E. Johnston surrenders to Union Major General William Tecumseh Sherman, at Durham Station, North Carolina.
  - Union cavalry corner John Wilkes Booth in a Virginia barn, and cavalryman Boston Corbett fatally shoots the assassin.
- April 27
  - The steamboat Sultana, carrying 2,300 passengers, explodes and sinks in the Mississippi River, killing 1,800, mostly Union survivors of the Andersonville Prison.
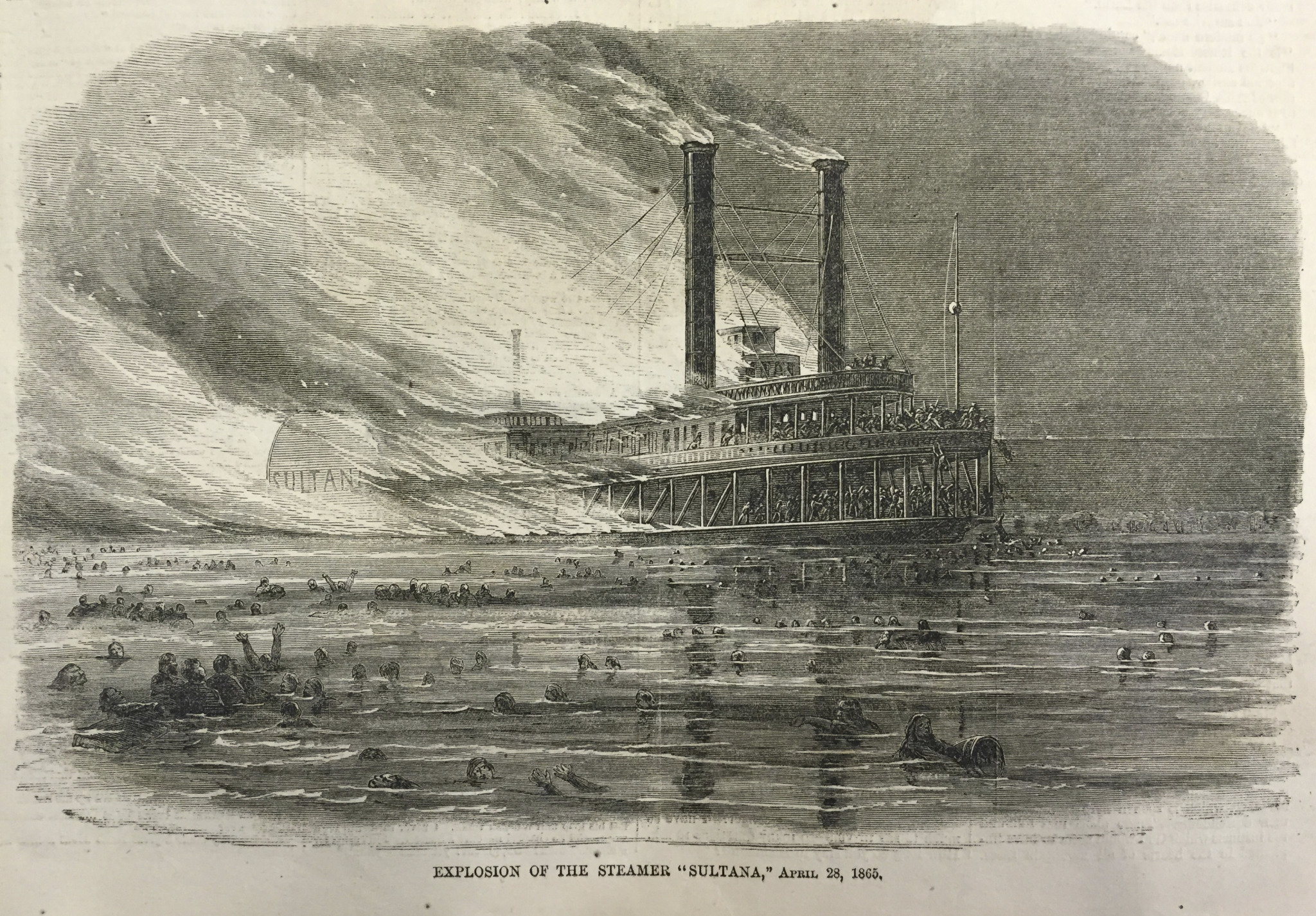
    April 27: Steamboat Sultana sinks.
  - Governor of New York Reuben Fenton signs a bill formally creating Cornell University.

=== May ===
- May 1 – The Treaty of the Triple Alliance of Argentina, Brazil, and Uruguay against Paraguay is formally signed, following the outbreak of the Paraguayan War.
- May 4 – American Civil War: Lieutenant General Richard Taylor, commanding all Confederate forces in Alabama, Mississippi, and eastern Louisiana, surrenders his forces to Union General Edward Canby at Citronelle, Alabama, effectively ending all Confederate resistance east of the Mississippi River.
- May 5 – In the United States:
  - In North Bend, Ohio (a suburb of Cincinnati), the first train robbery in the country takes place.
  - Jefferson Davis meets with his Confederate Cabinet (14 officials) for the last time, in Washington, Georgia, and the Confederate Government is officially dissolved.
- May 10 – American Civil War: Jefferson Davis is captured by the Union Army near Irwinville, Georgia.
- May 12 – Electric equipment and mobile brand Nokia founded in Tampere, Finland.
- May 12–13 – American Civil War – Battle of Palmito Ranch: In far south Texas, more than a month after Confederate General Lee's surrender, the last land battle of the civil war with casualties, ends with a Confederate victory.
- May 17
  - The International Telegraph Union is founded.
  - French missionary Father Armand David first observes Père David's deer in Peking, China.
- May 23 – Grand Review of the Armies: Union Army troops parade down Pennsylvania Avenue (Washington, D.C.) to celebrate the end of the American Civil War.
- May 25 – Mobile magazine explosion: 300 are killed in Mobile, Alabama, when an ordnance depot explodes.
- May 28 – The Mimosa sets sail with emigrants from Wales for Patagonia.
- May 29 – American Civil War: President of the United States Andrew Johnson issues a proclamation of general amnesty for most citizens of the former Confederacy.

=== June ===
- June 2 – American Civil War: Confederate forces west of the Mississippi River under General Edmund Kirby Smith surrender at Galveston, Texas, under terms negotiated on May 26, becoming the last to do so.
- June 10 – Richard Wagner's opera Tristan und Isolde debuts at the Munich Court Theatre.
- June 11 – Battle of the Riachuelo: The Brazilian Navy squadron defeats the Paraguayan Navy.

July 2: Salvation Army

- June 19 – American Civil War: Union Major General Gordon Granger lands at Galveston, Texas, and informs the people of Texas of the Emancipation Proclamation (an event celebrated in modern times each year as Juneteenth).
- June 23 – American Civil War: At Fort Towson in Oklahoma Territory, Confederate General Stand Watie, a Cherokee Indian, surrenders the last significant Rebel army.
- June 25 – James Hudson Taylor founds the China Inland Mission at Brighton, England.
- June 26 – Jumbo, a young male African elephant, arrives at London Zoo and becomes a popular attraction.
- June–August – English polymath Francis Galton first describes eugenics.

=== July ===
- July 2 – The Christian Mission, later renamed The Salvation Army, is founded in Whitechapel, London, by William and Catherine Booth.
- July 4 – Lewis Carroll publishes his children's novel Alice's Adventures in Wonderland in England (first trade editions in December).
- July 5
  - The U.S. Secret Service is founded.
  - The first speed limit is introduced in Britain: 2 mph (3.2 km/h) in town and 4 mph (6.4 km/h) in the country.
- July 7 – Following Abraham Lincoln's assassination on April 14, the four conspirators condemned to death during the trial are hanged, including David Herold, George Atzerodt, Lewis Powell and Mary Surratt. Her son, John Surratt, escapes execution by fleeing to Canada, and ultimately to Egypt.
- July 14 – First ascent of the Matterhorn: The summit of the Matterhorn in the Alps is reached for the first time, by a party of 7 led by the Englishman Edward Whymper; 4 die in a fall during the descent.

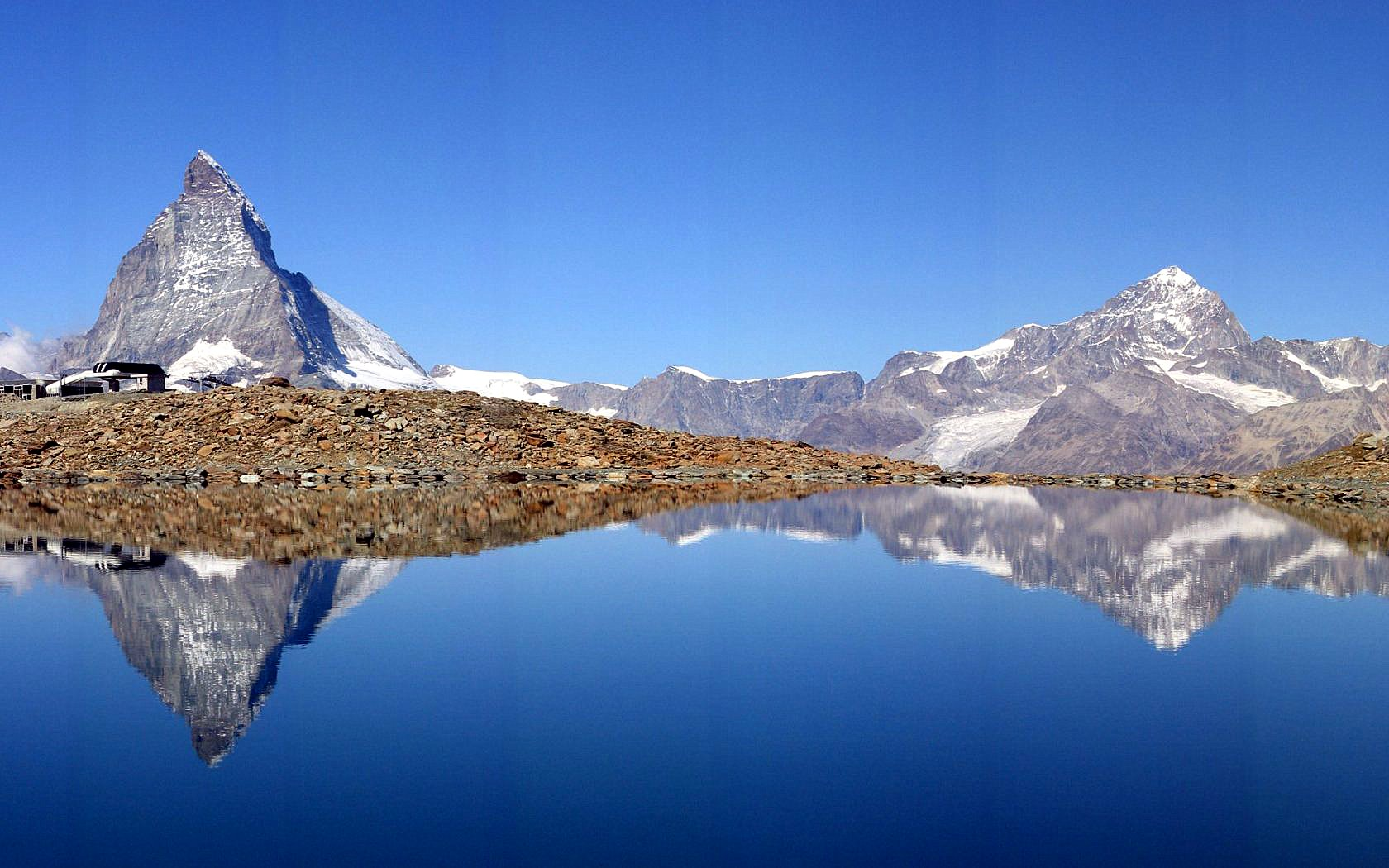
July 14: Matterhorn climbed.

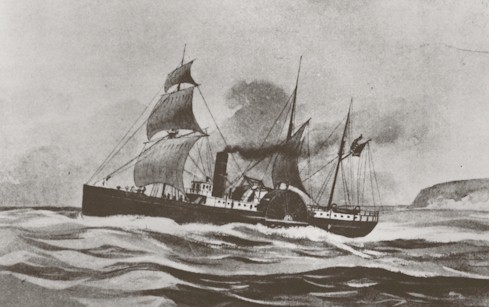
July 30: Steamer Brother Jonathan sinks.

- July 21 – Wild Bill Hickok – Davis Tutt shootout: In the market square of Springfield, Missouri, Wild Bill Hickok shoots "Little Dave" Davis Tutt dead over a poker debt, in what is regarded as the first true western fast draw showdown.
- July 23 – The SS Great Eastern departs on a voyage to lay a transatlantic telegraph cable.
- July 26 – The New Zealand Parliament first meets in Wellington on a permanent basis, making it de facto the national capital.
- July 27
  - Welsh settlers arrive in Argentina at Chubut Valley.
  - Businessman Asa Packer establishes Lehigh University in Bethlehem, Pennsylvania.
- July 30 – The steamer Brother Jonathan sinks off the California coast, killing 225 passengers and crew.
- July 31 – The first narrow gauge mainline railway in the world opens at Grandchester, Australia.

=== August ===
- August 16 – The Dominican Republic regains independence from Spain.
- August 25 – The Shergotty meteorite Mars meteorite falls in Sherghati, Gaya, Bihar in India.

=== September ===
- September 19 – Union Business College (now Peirce College) is founded in Philadelphia.
- September 26 – Champ Ferguson becomes the first person (and one of only two) to be convicted of war crimes for actions taken during the American Civil War, found guilty by a U.S. Army tribunal on 23 charges, arising from the murder of 53 people. He is hanged on October 20, two days after the conviction of Henry Wirz for war crimes.

=== October ===
- October 11 – Morant Bay rebellion: Paul Bogle leads hundreds of black men and women in a march in Jamaica; the rebellion is brutally suppressed by the British governor Edward John Eyre with 400 executed.
- October 25 – Florida drafts its constitution in Tallahassee.
- October 26
  - The Standard Oil Company opens.
  - The paddlewheel steamer SS Republic sinks off the Georgia coast, with a cargo of $400,000 in coins.

=== November ===
- November 6 – American Civil War: The CSS Shenandoah, last remnant of the Confederate States of America and its military, surrenders in Liverpool after fleeing westward from the Pacific.
- November 10 – Captain Henry Wirz, Confederate superintendent of Andersonville Prison (Camp Sumter) is hanged, becoming the second of two combatants, and only serving regular soldier, to be executed for war crimes committed during the American Civil War.
- November 11 – Duar War between Britain and Bhutan ends with the Treaty of Sinchula, in which Bhutan cedes control of its southern passes to Britain in return for an annual subsidy.
- November 17 – Chincha Islands War: Action of 17 November 1865 – A Spanish gunboat is captured by the Chilean tugboat Independencia off Tomé, in the Bay of Concepción, Chile.
- November 26 – Chincha Islands War: Battle of Papudo – The Spanish ship Covadonga is captured by the Chileans and the Peruvians, north of Valparaíso, Chile.

=== December ===
- December 11 – The United States Congress creates the United States House Committee on Appropriations and the Committee on Banking and Commerce, reducing the tasks of the House Committee on Ways and Means.
- December 17 – Leopold II becomes King of the Belgians, following the death (on December 10) of his father, King Leopold I.
- December 18 – Secretary of State William H. Seward declares the Thirteenth Amendment to the United States Constitution ratified by three-quarters of the states, including those in secession. As of December 6, slavery is legally outlawed in the last two slave states of Kentucky and Delaware, and the remaining 45,000 slaves are freed.
- December 21 – The Kappa Alpha Order is founded at Washington College, Lexington, Virginia.
- December 24 – Jonathan Shank and Barry Ownby form the Ku Klux Klan in the American South, to resist Reconstruction and intimidate carpetbaggers and scalawags, as well as to repress the freedpeople.

Francis Galton.

=== Date unknown ===
- A forest fire near Silverton, Oregon, destroys about one million acres (4,000 km^{2}) of timber.
- The National Temperance Society and Publishing House is founded by James Black in the U.S.
- Nottingham Forest Football Club, an association football based in West Bridgford, Nottingham, England, is founded.

== Births ==
=== January–February ===
- January 5 – Julio Garavito Armero, Colombian astronomer (d. 1920)
- January 9 – Leo Ditrichstein, Austrian-born stage actor, playwright (d. 1928)
- January 19 – Valentin Serov, Russian portrait painter (d. 1911)
- January 20 – Yvette Guilbert, French cabaret singer, actress (d. 1944)
- January 27 – Nikolai Pokrovsky, Russian politician, last foreign minister of the Russian Empire (d. 1930)
- January 28
  - Lala Lajpat Rai ("The Lion of Punjab"), a leader of the Indian independence movement (d. 1928)
  - Kaarlo Juho Ståhlberg, 1st President of Finland (d. 1952)
- January 31 – Henri Desgrange, French cycling enthusiast, founder of the Tour de France (d. 1940)
- February 4 – Ernest Hanbury Hankin, English bacteriologist, naturalist (d. 1939)
- February 9 – Beatrice Stella Tanner, later Mrs. Patrick Campbell, English theatre actress, producer (d. 1940)
- February 12
  - Enrico Millo, Italian admiral and politician (d. 1930)
  - Kazimierz Tetmajer, Polish writer (d. 1940)
- February 17 – Ernst Troeltsch, German theologian (d. 1923).
- February 19 – Sven Hedin, Swedish scientist, explorer (d. 1952)
- February 21 – John Haden Badley, English author, educator (d. 1967)
- February 28 – Wilfred Grenfell, English medical missionary to Newfoundland and Labrador (d. 1940)

=== March–April ===
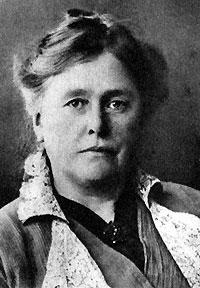
Elma Danielsson

- March 1 – Elma Danielsson, Swedish socialist, journalist (d. 1936)
- March 10 – Tan Sitong, Chinese reformist leader (d. 1898)
- March 15 – Sui Sin Far, English-born writer (d. 1914)
- March 18 – Carl Erik Johan Mannerheim, Finnish nobleman and banker (d. 1915)
- March 19 – William Morton Wheeler, American entomologist (d. 1937)
- March 30 – Heinrich Rubens, German physicist (d. 1922)
- April – Richard Rushall, British sea captain and businessman (d. 1953)
- April 1 – Richard Adolf Zsigmondy, Austrian-born chemist, Nobel Prize laureate (d. 1929)
- April 2 – Gyorche Petrov, Macedonian and Bulgarian revolutionary (d. 1921)
- April 6 – Victory Bateman, American stage and screen actress (d. 1926)
- April 9
  - Violet Nicolson, English poet (d. 1904)
  - Erich Ludendorff, German general (d. 1937)
  - Charles Proteus Steinmetz, German-American engineer, electrician (d. 1923)
- April 14 – Alfred Hoare Powell, English Arts and Crafts architect, and designer and painter of pottery (d. 1960)
- April 16 – Harry Chauvel, Australian Army general (d. 1945)
- April 18 – Leónidas Plaza, 16th President of Ecuador (d. 1932)
- April 19 – Josephine Hall, American actress and soprano (d. 1920)
- April 26 – Akseli Gallen-Kallela, Finnish artist (d. 1931)
- April 28
  - Vital Brazil, Brazilian physician, immunologist (d. 1950)
  - Charles W. Woodworth, American entomologist (d. 1940)

=== May–June ===
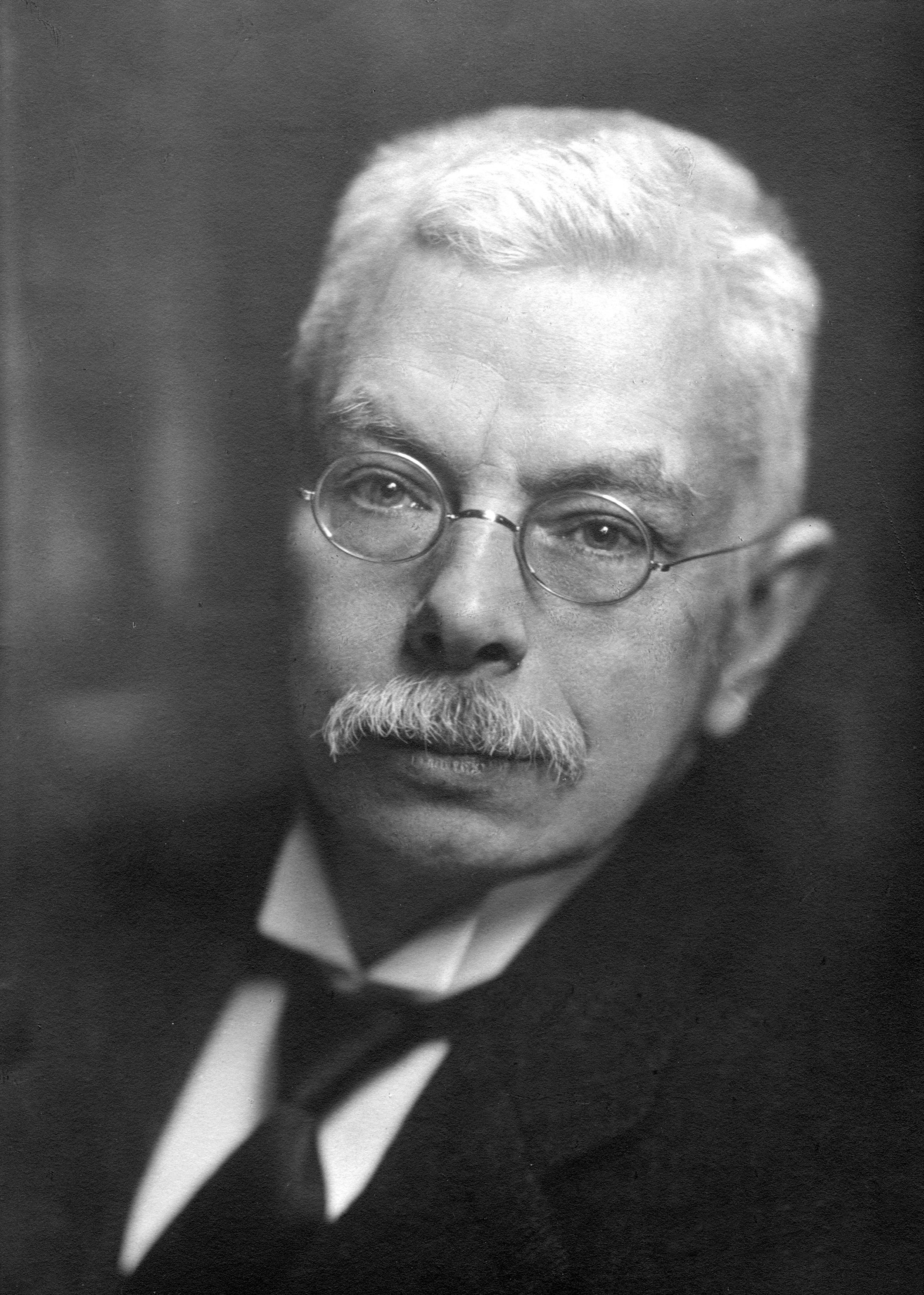
Pieter Zeeman

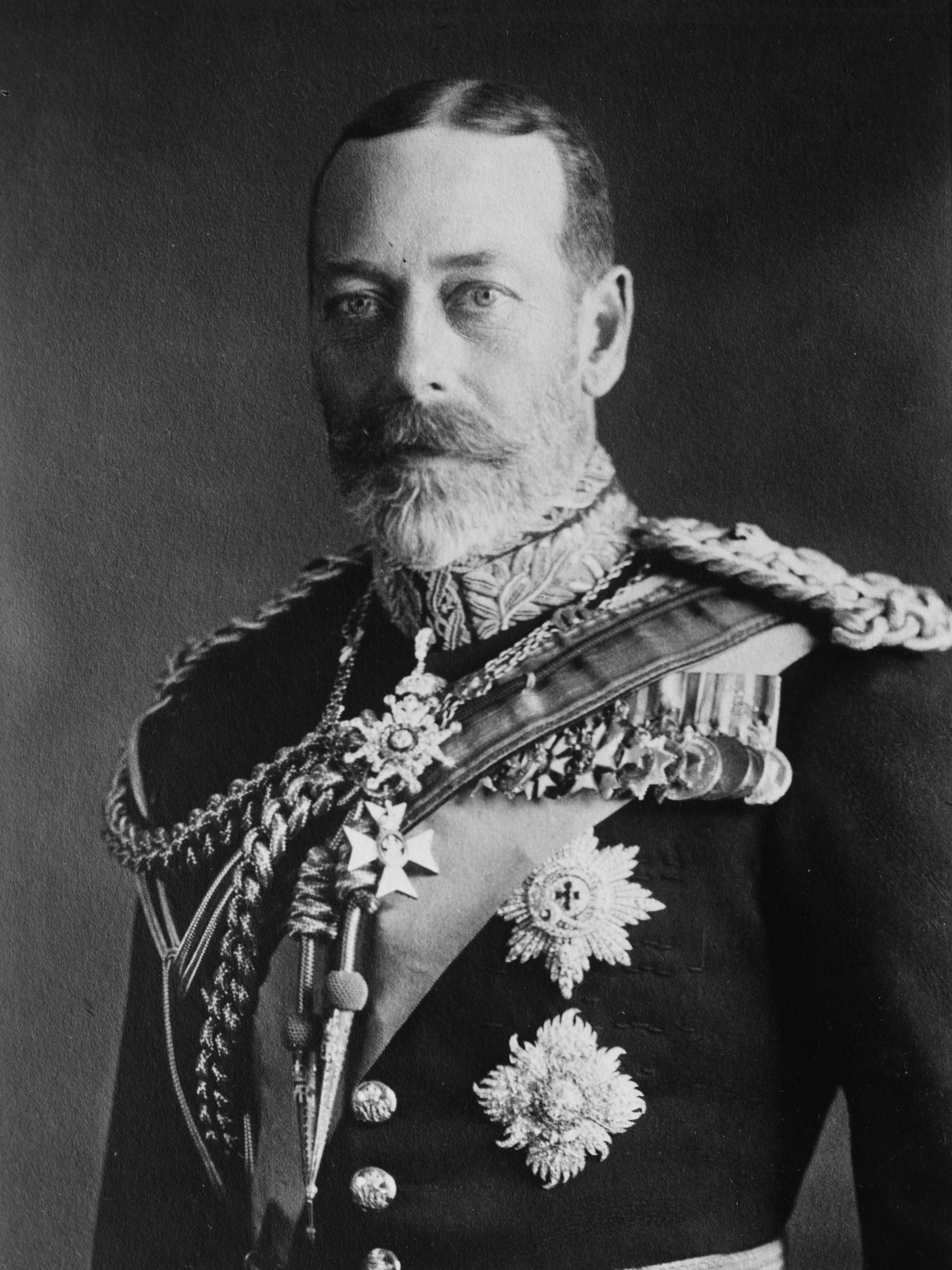
King George V of the United Kingdom

- May 2 – Clyde Fitch, American dramatist (d. 1909)
- May 3 – Martha M. Simpson, Australian educationalist (d. 1948)
- May 23 – Epitácio Pessoa, 11th President of Brazil (d. 1942)
- May 25
  - John Mott, American YMCA leader, recipient of the Nobel Peace Prize (d. 1955)
  - Pieter Zeeman, Dutch physicist, Nobel Prize laureate (d. 1943)
- May 26 – Robert W. Chambers, American artist (d. 1933)
- June 2 – George Lohmann, English cricketer (d. 1901)
- June 3 – George V of the United Kingdom (d. 1936)
- June 9
  - Albéric Magnard, French composer (d. 1914)
  - Carl Nielsen, Danish composer (d. 1931)
- June 13 – W. B. Yeats, Irish writer, Nobel Prize laureate (d. 1939)
- June 19
  - Alfred Hugenberg, German businessman, politician (d. 1951)
  - May Whitty, British stage and screen actress (d. 1948)
- June 21 – Otto Frank, German physiologist (d. 1944)
- June 26 – Bernard Berenson, American art historian (d. 1959)
- June 27 – John Monash, Australian general (d. 1931)
- June 29 – Shigechiyo Izumi, Japanese supercentenarian (d. 1986)

=== July–August ===
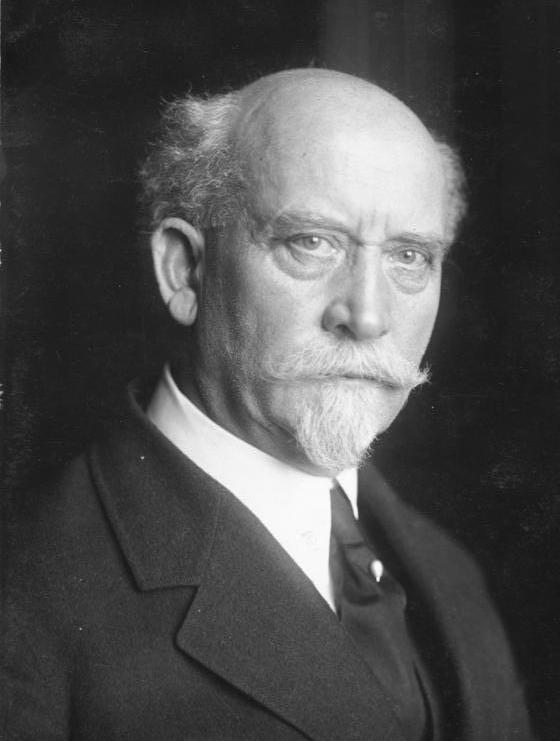
Philipp Scheidemann

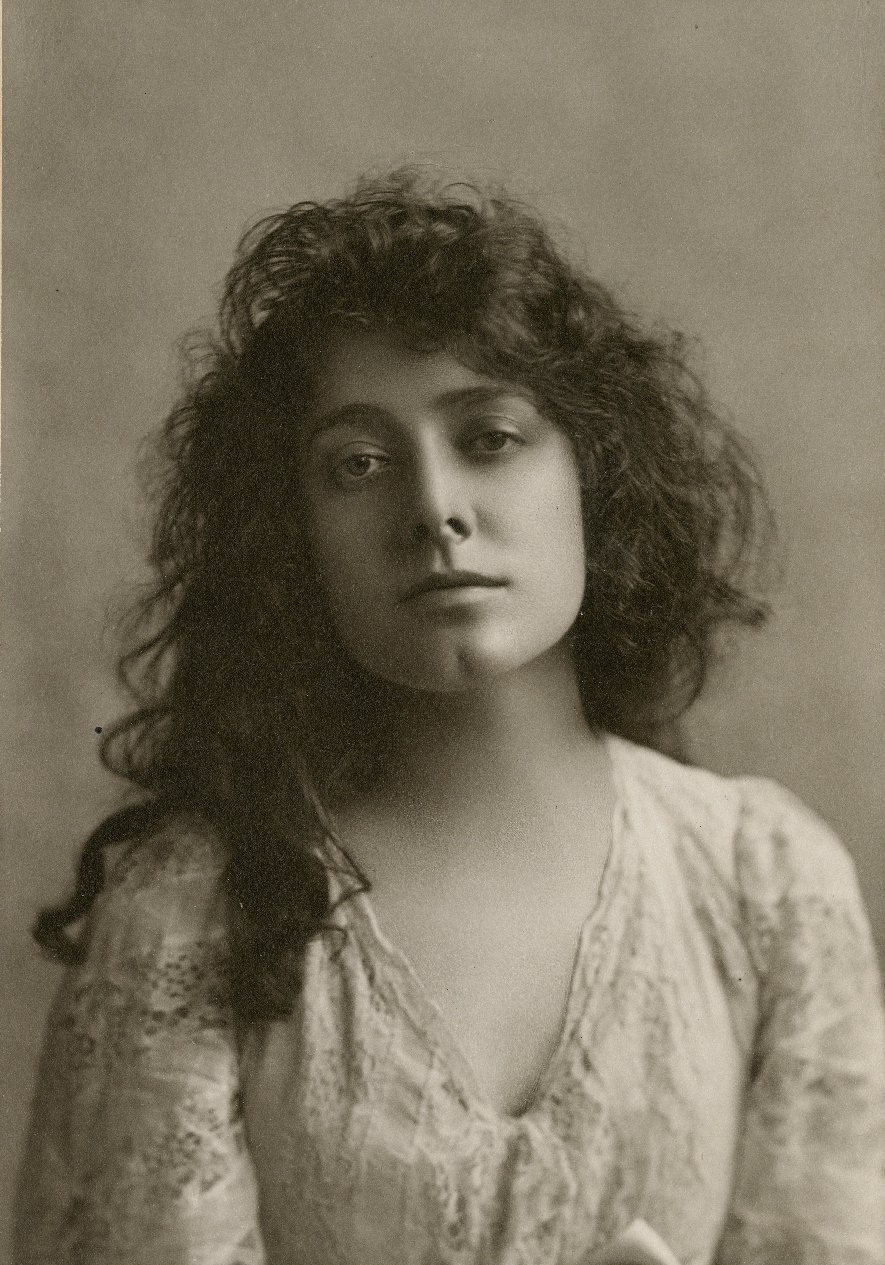
Julia Marlowe

- July 1 – Granville Ryrie, Australian Army general, politician, and diplomat (d. 1937)
- July 13 – Gérard Encausse, French occultist (d. 1916)
- July 15 – Alfred Harmsworth, 1st Viscount Northcliffe, Irish-born British publisher; founder of the Daily Mail and Daily Mirror (d.1922)
- July 23
  - Max Heindel, Danish-born Christian occultist, astrologer, and mystic (d. 1919)
  - Edward Terry Sanford, Associate Justice of the Supreme Court of the United States (d. 1930)
- July 26 – Philipp Scheidemann, 11th Chancellor of Germany (d. 1939)
- August 2
  - Irving Babbitt, American literary critic (d. 1933)
  - John Radecki, Australian stained glass artist (d. 1955)
- August 10 – Alexander Glazunov, Russian composer (d. 1936)
- August 15 – Usui Mikao, Japanese founder of reiki (d. 1926)
- August 17 – Julia Marlowe, English-born American stage actress (d. 1950)
- August 20 – Bernard Tancred, South African cricketer (d. 1911)
- August 22 – Templar Saxe, British actor and singer (d. 1935)
- August 24 – King Ferdinand I of Romania (d. 1927)
- August 27 – James Henry Breasted, American Egyptologist (d. 1935)

=== September–October ===
- September 4 – Maria Karłowska, Polish Roman Catholic religious professed and blessed (d. 1935)
- September 11 – Rainis, Latvian poet, playwright (d. 1929)
- September 13 – William Birdwood, 1st Baron Birdwood, British field marshal (d. 1951)
- September 26 – Mary Russell, Duchess of Bedford, English aviator, ornithologist (d. 1937)

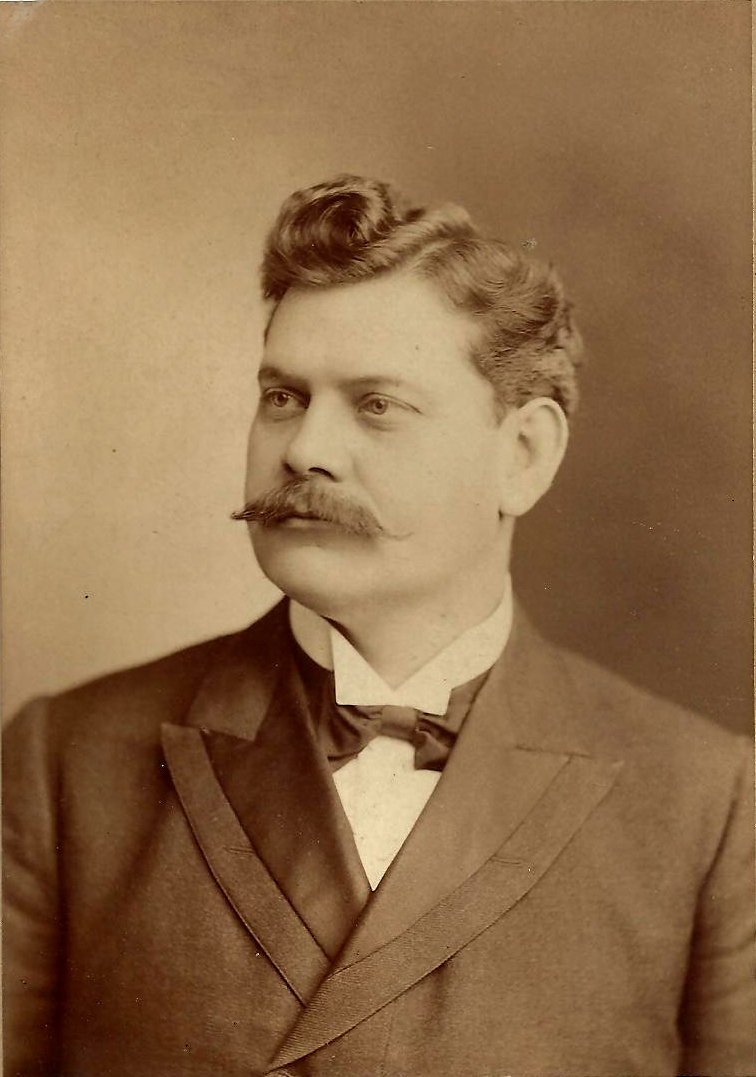
Charles W. Clark

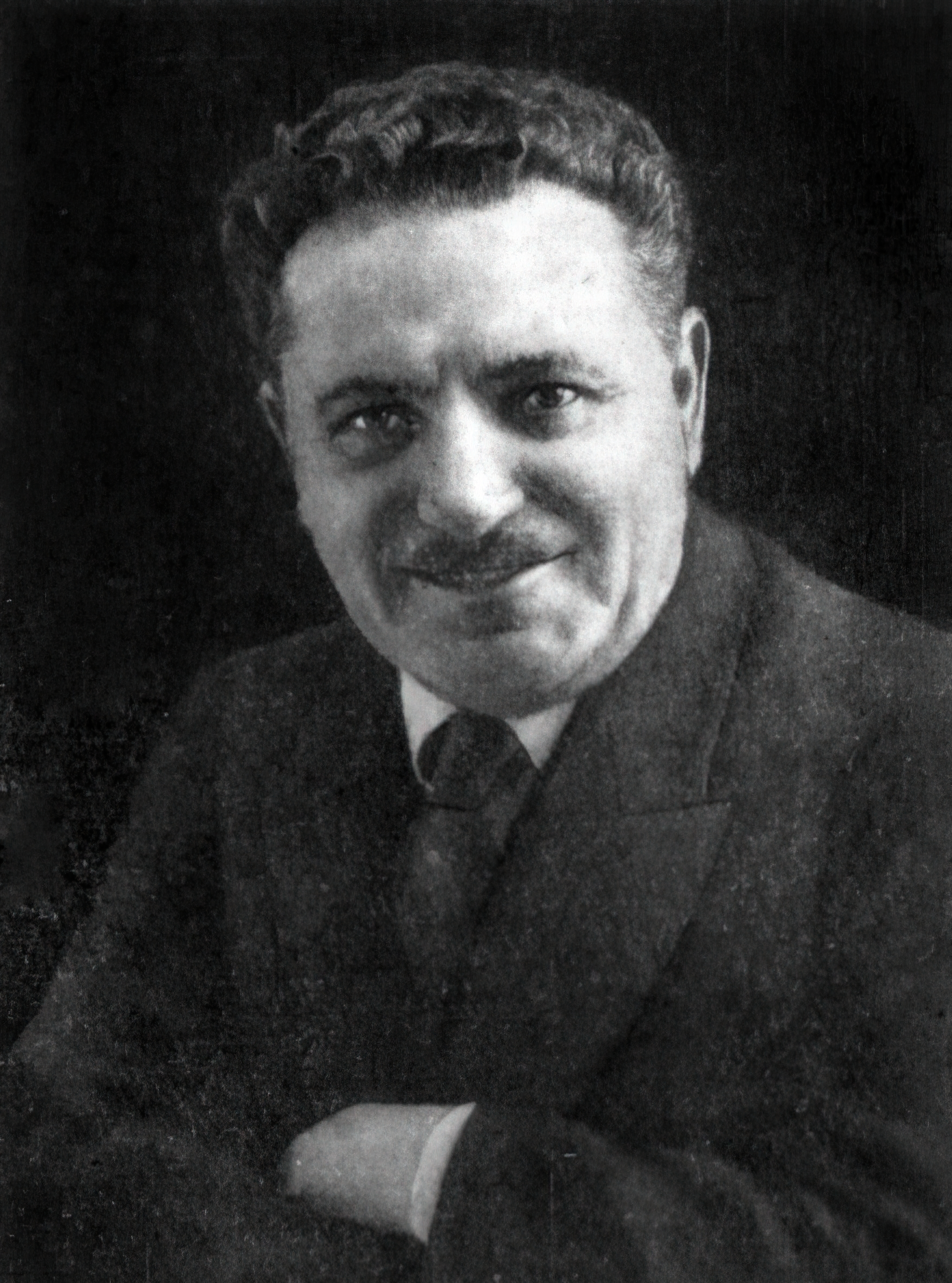
Hovhannes Abelian

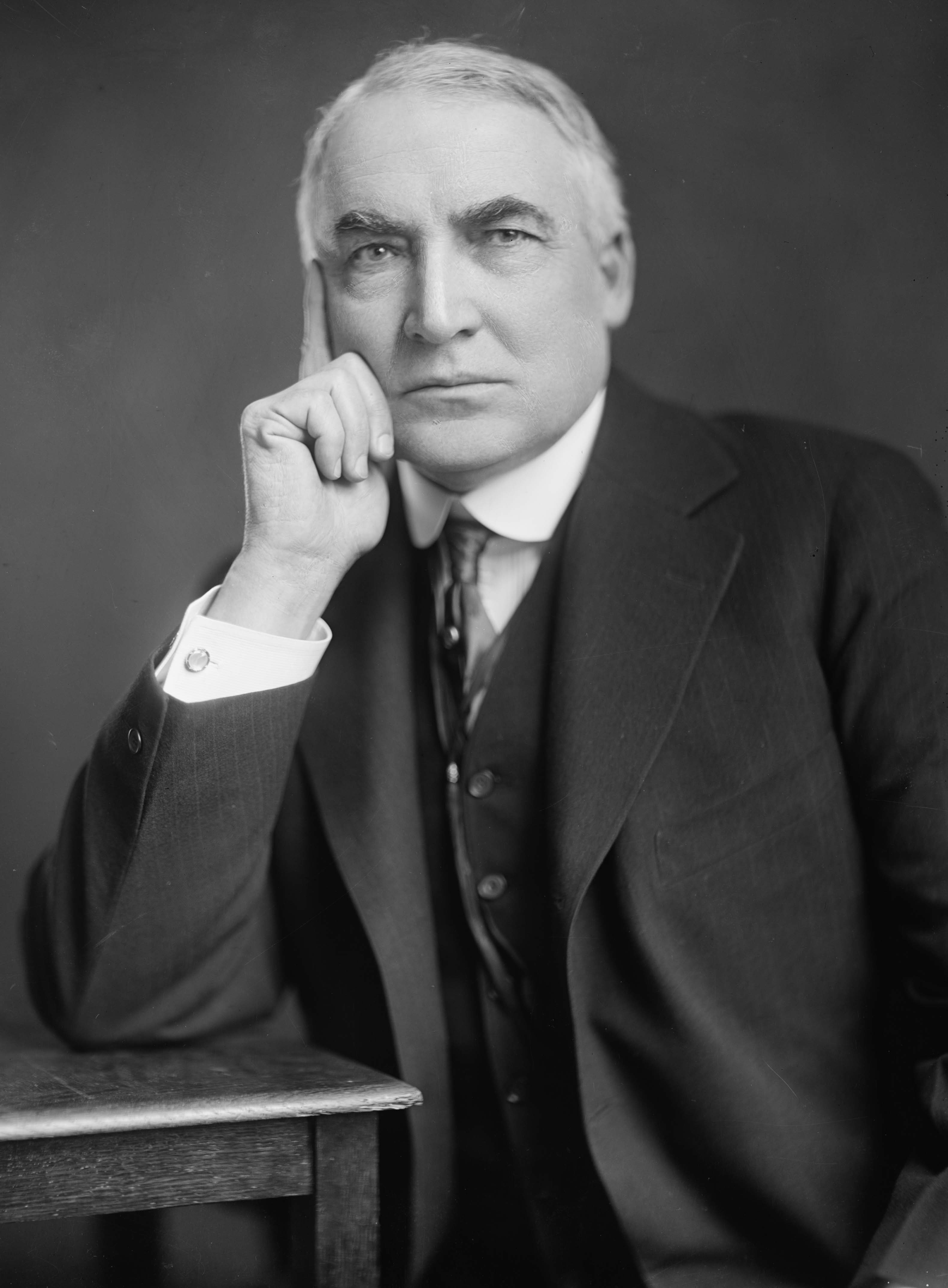
Warren G. Harding

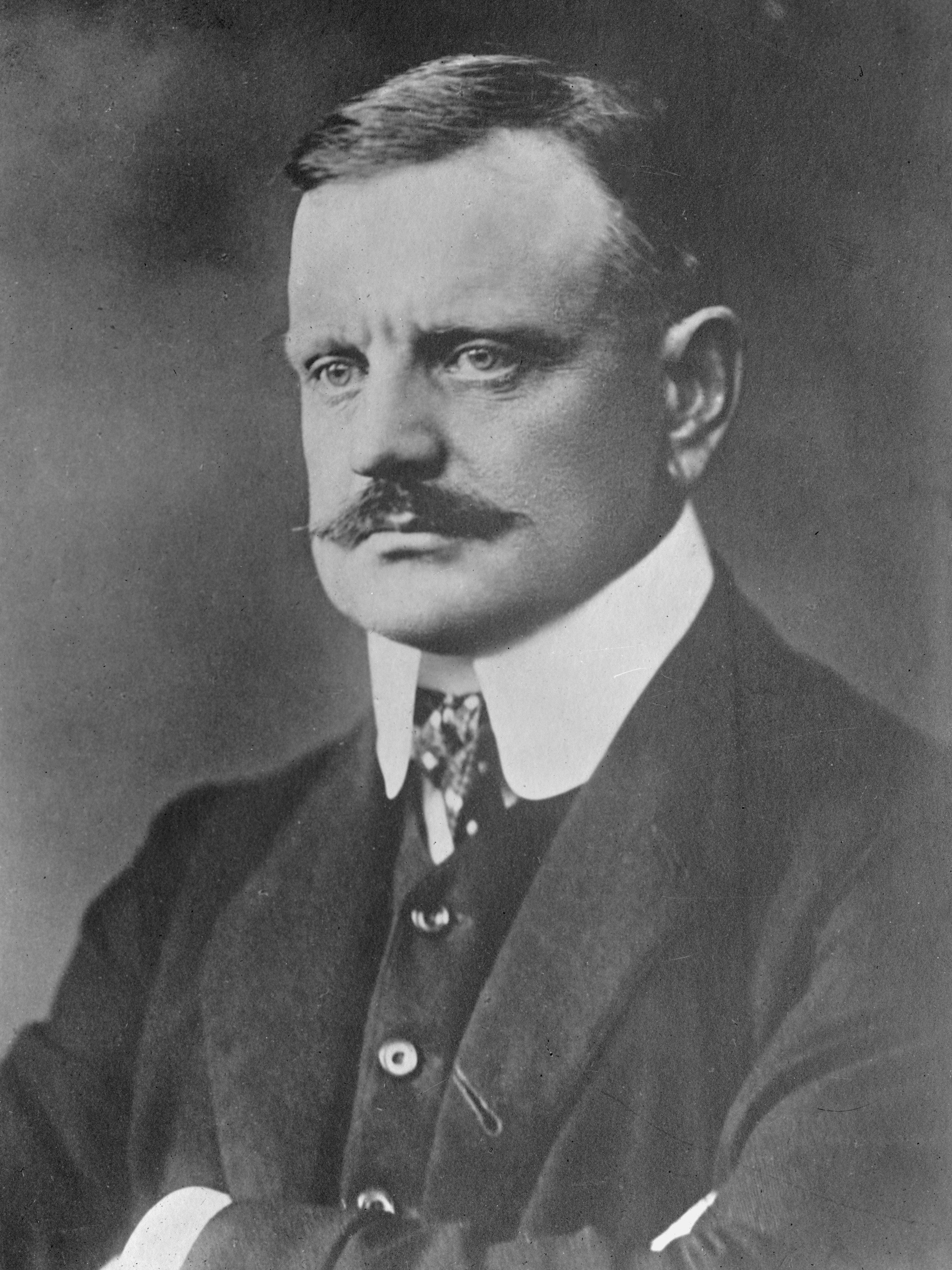
Jean Sibelius

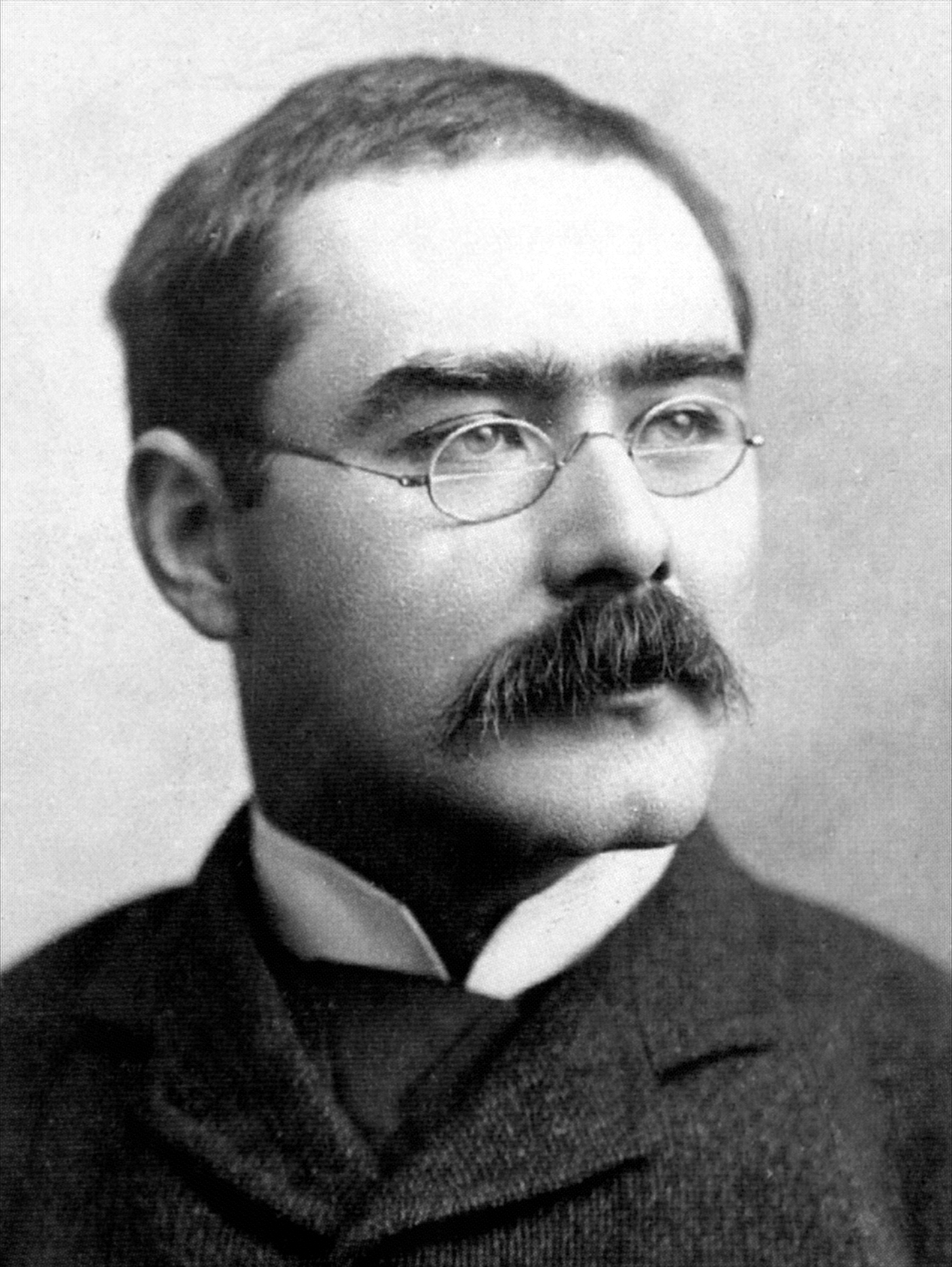
Rudyard Kipling

- October 1 – Paul Dukas, French composer (d. 1935)
- October 9 – Arthur Hayes-Sadler, British admiral (d. 1952)
- October 10 – Rafael Merry del Val, Spanish Roman Catholic Cardinal and Secretary of the Congregation of the Holy Office (d. 1930)
- October 12 – Arthur Harden, English chemist, Nobel Prize laureate (d. 1940)
- October 15 – Charles W. Clark, American baritone (d. 1925)
- October 16 – Rudolph Lambart, 10th Earl of Cavan, British field marshal (d. 1946)
- October 17 – James Rudolph Garfield, U.S. politician (d. 1950)
- October 22
  - Charles James Briggs, British general (d. 1941)
  - Raymond Hitchcock, American actor (d. 1929)
- October 23 – Hovhannes Abelian, Armenian actor (d. 1936)
- October 26 – Benjamin Guggenheim, American businessman (d. 1912)
- October 27 – Tinsley Lindley, English footballer (d. 1940)

=== November–December ===
- November 2 – Warren G. Harding, 29th President of the United States (d. 1923)
- November 11 – Edwin Thanhouser, American actor, businessman, and film producer, founder of the Thanhouser Company (d. 1956)
- December 8
  - Rüdiger von der Goltz, German general (d. 1946)
  - Jean Sibelius, Finnish composer (d. 1957)
- December 12 – Edwyn Alexander-Sinclair, British admiral (d. 1945)
- December 16 – Olavo Bilac, Brazilian poet (d. 1918)
- December 19 – Minnie Maddern Fiske, American stage actress (d. 1932)
- December 20 – Elsie de Wolfe, American socialite, interior decorator (d. 1950)
- December 23
  - Anna Farquhar Bergengren, American author and editor (unknown year of death)
  - James M. Canty, American educator, school administrator, and businessperson (d. 1964)
  - Albrecht, Duke of Württemberg, German field marshal (d. 1939)
- December 25
  - Evangeline Booth, 4th General of The Salvation Army (d. 1950)
  - Fay Templeton, American musical comedy star (d. 1939)
- December 28 – Félix Vallotton, Swiss painter, printmaker (d. 1925)
- December 29 – Otis Harlan, American actor and comedian (d. 1940)
- December 30 – Rudyard Kipling, Indian-born English writer, Nobel Prize laureate (d. 1936)

=== Date unknown ===
- Ernest Hogan, African-American dancer, musician, and comedian (d. 1909)
- Habibullah Qurayshi, Bengali Islamic scholar and educationist (d. 1943)

== Deaths ==
=== January–June ===
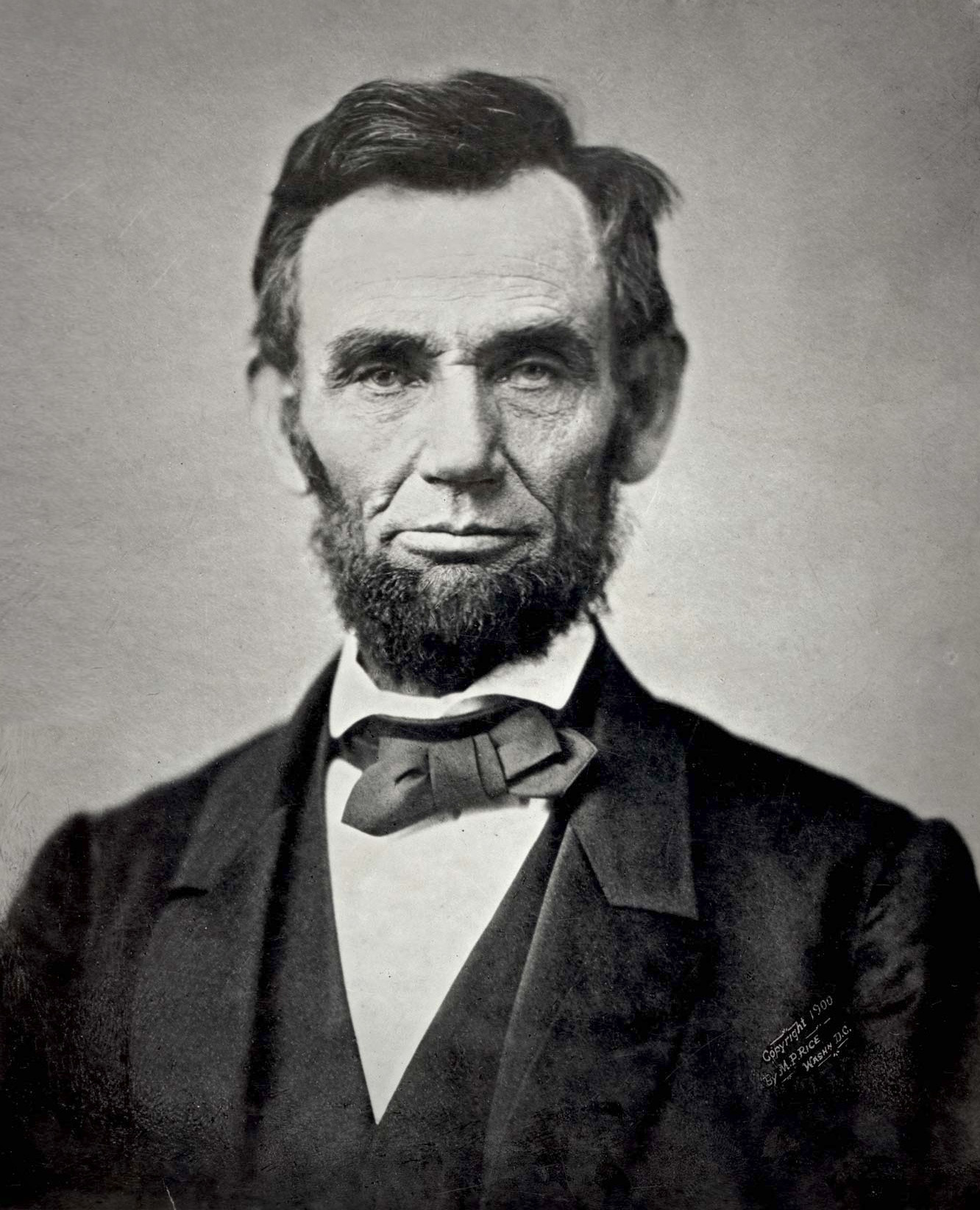
Abraham Lincoln

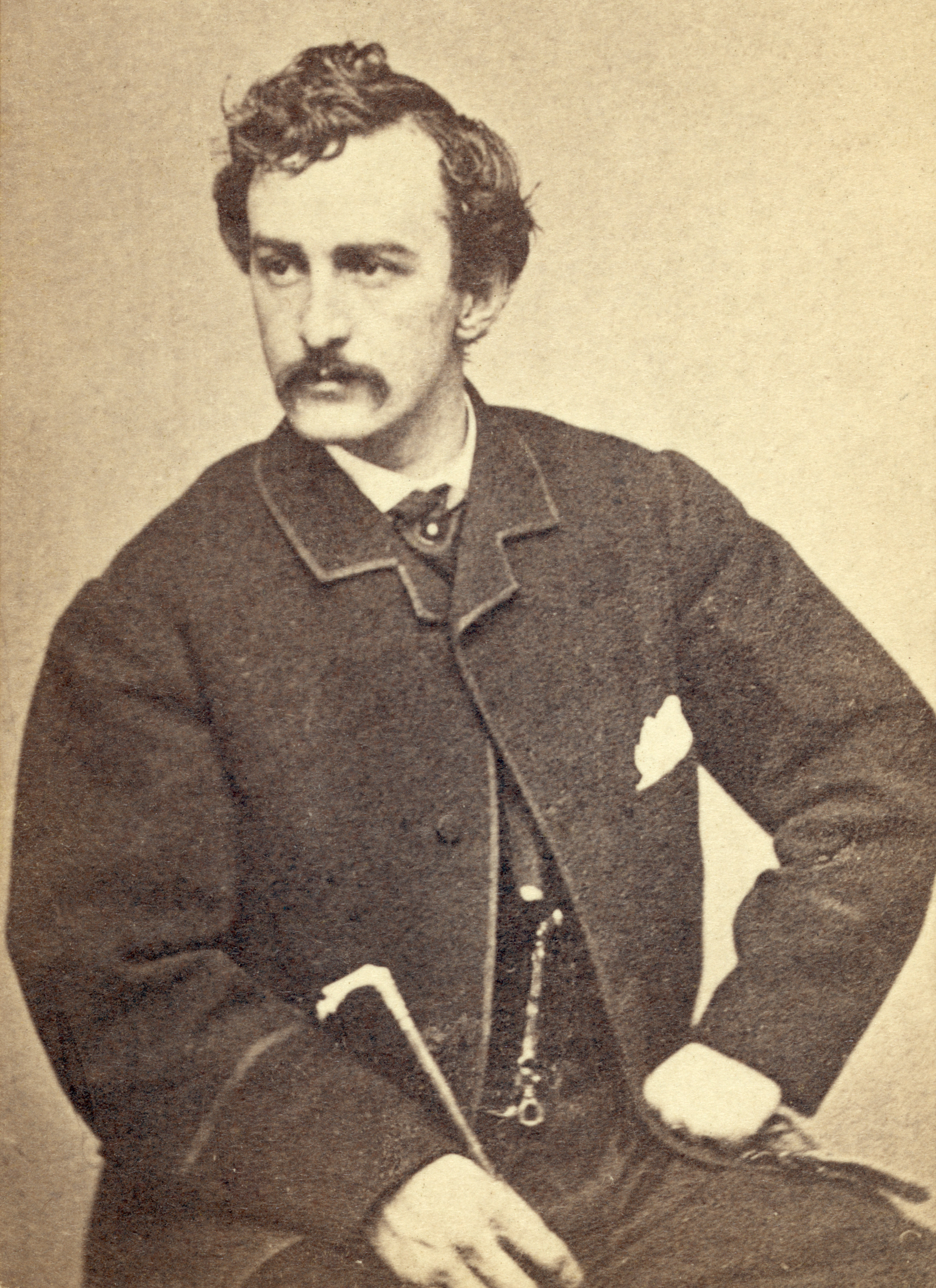
John Wilkes Booth

- January 14 – Marie-Anne Libert, Belgian botanist (b. 1782)
- January 19 – Pierre-Joseph Proudhon, French philosopher, anarchist (b. 1809)
- January 28 – Felice Romani, Italian poet, librettist (b. 1788)
- February 6 – Isabella Beeton, British cook, household management expert (b. 1836)
- March 1 – Anna Pavlovna of Russia, queen consort of the Netherlands (b. 1795)
- March 20 – Yamanami Keisuke, Japanese samurai (b. 1833)
- March 30 – Alexander Dukhnovich, Russian priest, writer and social activist (b. 1803
- April 1
  - John Milton, Governor of Florida (b. 1807)
  - Giuditta Pasta, Italian soprano (b. 1798)
- April 2 – A. P. Hill, American Confederate general (b. 1825)
- April 13 – Achille Valenciennes, French zoologist (b. 1794)
- April 15 – Abraham Lincoln, 16th President of the United States (b. 1809)
- April 18 – Léon Jean Marie Dufour, French medical doctor, naturalist (b. 1780)
- April 24 – Nicholas Alexandrovich, Tsarevich of Russia (b. 1843)
- April 26 – John Wilkes Booth, American actor, assassin of Abraham Lincoln (b. 1838)
- April 28 – Sir Samuel Cunard, Canadian businessman, founder of the Cunard Line (b. 1787)
- May 5 – Ben Hall, Australian bushranger (b. 1837)
- May 10 – William Armstrong, American lawyer, civil servant, politician, and businessperson (b. 1782)

=== July–December ===
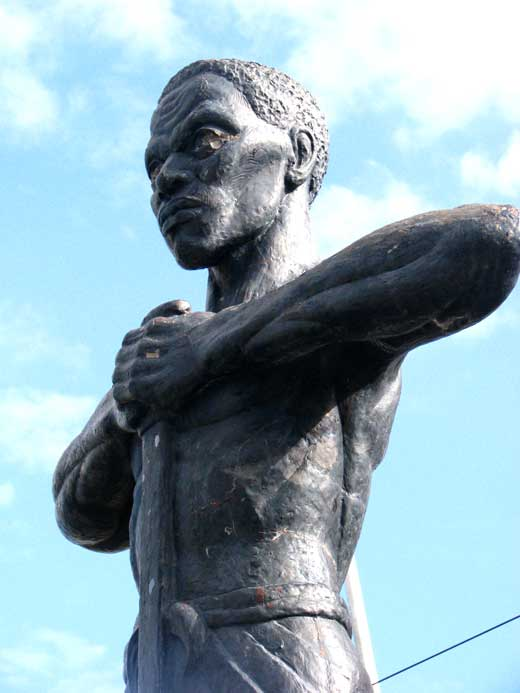
Paul Bogle

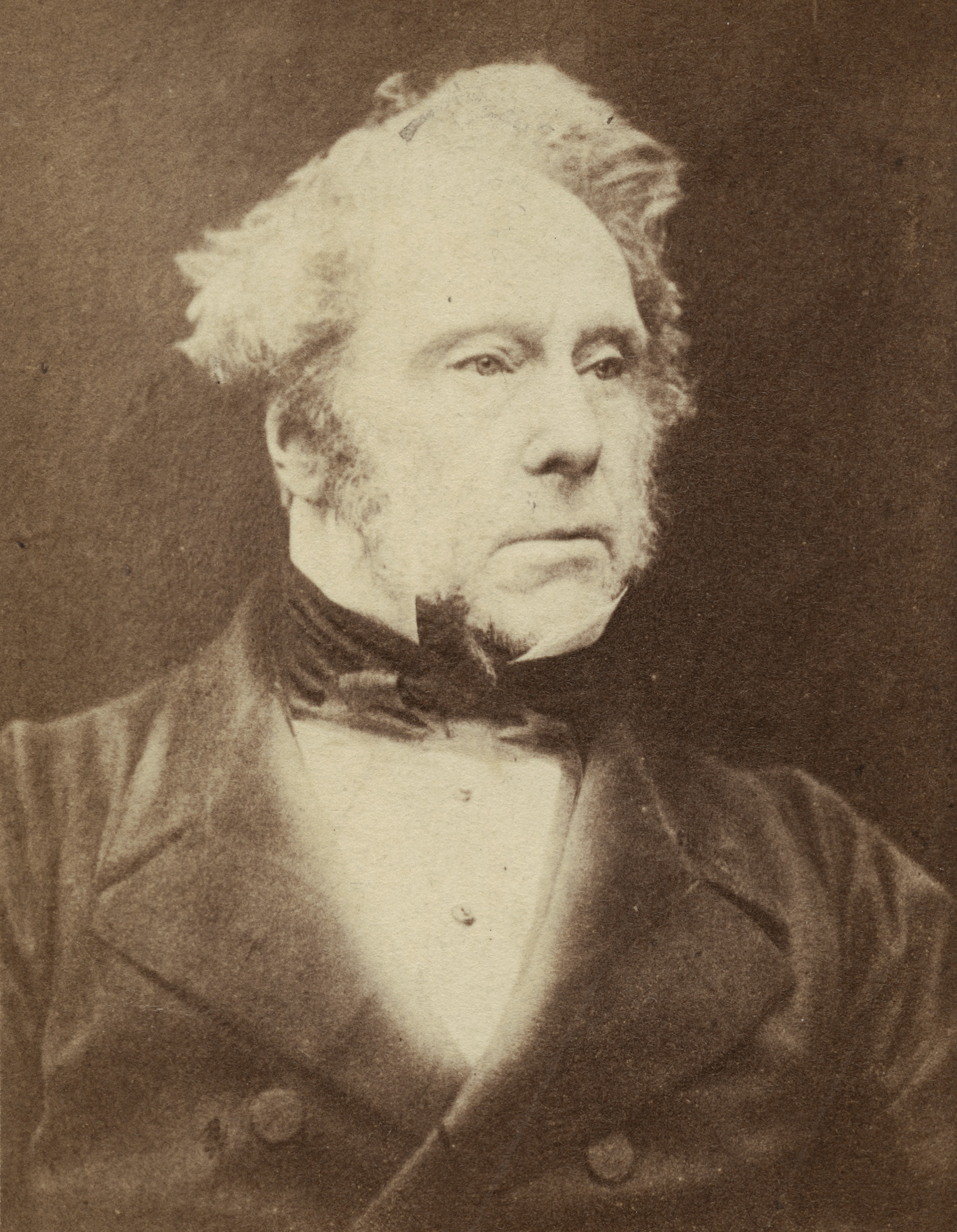
Henry John Temple

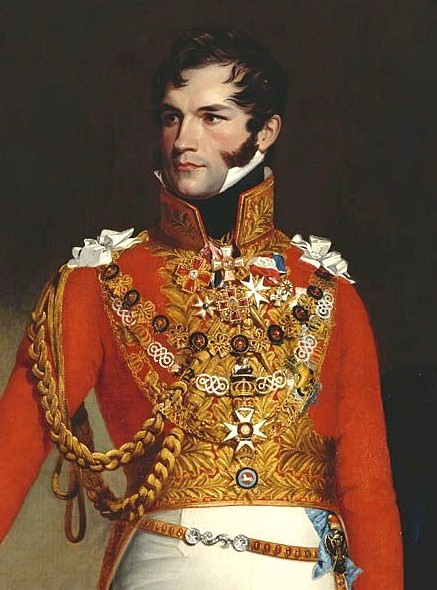
Leopold I of Belgium

- July – Dimitris Plapoutas, Greek military leader (b. 1786)
- July 6 – Princess Sophie of Sweden, Grand Duchess of Baden (b. 1801)
- July 7 – The Lincoln assassination conspirators (executed)
  - Lewis Powell (b. 1844)
  - David Herold (b. 1842)
  - George Atzerodt (b. 1835)
  - Mary Surratt (b. 1823)
- July 25 – James Barry, British military surgeon (b. 1795)
- August 4 – Percival Drayton, United States Navy officer (b. 1812)
- August 12 – William Jackson Hooker, English botanist (b. 1785)
- August 13 – Ignaz Semmelweis, Hungarian physician (b. 1818)
- August 16 – Sir Frederick Stovin, British army general (b. 1783)
- August 27 – Thomas Chandler Haliburton, Canadian author (b. 1796)
- August 29 – Robert Remak, German embryologist, physiologist and neurologist (b. 1815)
- September 2 – William Rowan Hamilton, Irish mathematician (b. 1805)
- September 10 – Maria Silfvan, Finnish actor (b. 1802)
- September 25 – Andrés de Santa Cruz, Peruvian military officer, seventh President of Peru and President of Bolivia (b. 1792)
- October 16 – Andrés Bello, Venezuelan poet, lawmaker, teacher, philosopher and sociologist (b. 1781)
- October 18 – Henry John Temple, 3rd Viscount Palmerston, Prime Minister of the United Kingdom (b. 1784)
- October 24 – Paul Bogle, Jamaican activist, Baptist deacon and leader of the Morant Bay rebellion. (executed) (b. 1820)
- November 10 – Henry Wirz, Swiss-born American Confederate military officer, prisoner-of-war camp commander (executed) (b. 1823)
- November 12 – Elizabeth Gaskell, British novelist, biographer (b. 1810)
- November 28
  - José Manuel Pareja, Spanish admiral (suicide) (b. 1813)
  - William Machin Stairs, Canadian businessman, statesman (b. 1789)
- November 29 – Isaac A. Van Amburgh, American animal trainer (b. 1811)
- December 6 – Sebastián Iradier, Spanish composer (b. 1809)
- December 10 – King Leopold I of Belgium (b. 1790)
- December 14 – Johan Georg Forchhammer, Danish geologist (b. 1794)
- December 17 – Luigi Ciacchi, Italian cardinal (b. 1788)
