= 1866 in Germany =

- Decades: 1840s; 1850s; 1860s; 1870s; 1880s
- See also: Other events of 1866; History of Germany • Timeline • Years

These are events from the year 1866 in Germany.

== Incumbents ==
- King of Bavaria – Ludwig II of Bavaria
- King of Prussia – William I
- King of Saxony – John

== Events ==
8 April	The kingdoms of Italy and Prussia form an alliance against the Austrian Empire.
14 June	Austro-Prussian War: Prussia declared war on Austria.
3 July	Battle of Königgrätz: Prussian forces broke an Austrian line and dealt them a decisive defeat at modern Hradec Králové.
7 May	Student Ferdinand Cohen-Blind makes a failed attempt to assassinate Otto von Bismarck in Unter den Linden in Berlin.
27–29 June	Battle of Langensalza: The Prussians defeat the Hanoverian Army.
3 July	Battle of Königgrätz: the Prussian army under King Wilhelm and Helmuth von Moltke defeats the Austrian army of Ludwig von Benedek, leading to a decisive Prussian victory in the Austro-Prussian War.
18 August	Prussia and fifteen smaller northern German states signed the North German Confederation Treaty, transferring their armed forces to the North German Confederation under the command of the Prussian king William I, German Emperor.
23 August	Austro-Prussian War: Prussia and Austria signed the Peace of Prague, in which the latter agreed to some small territorial concessions and the dissolution of the German Confederation, ending the war.
October:	Alfred Nobel invents dynamite in Geesthacht.

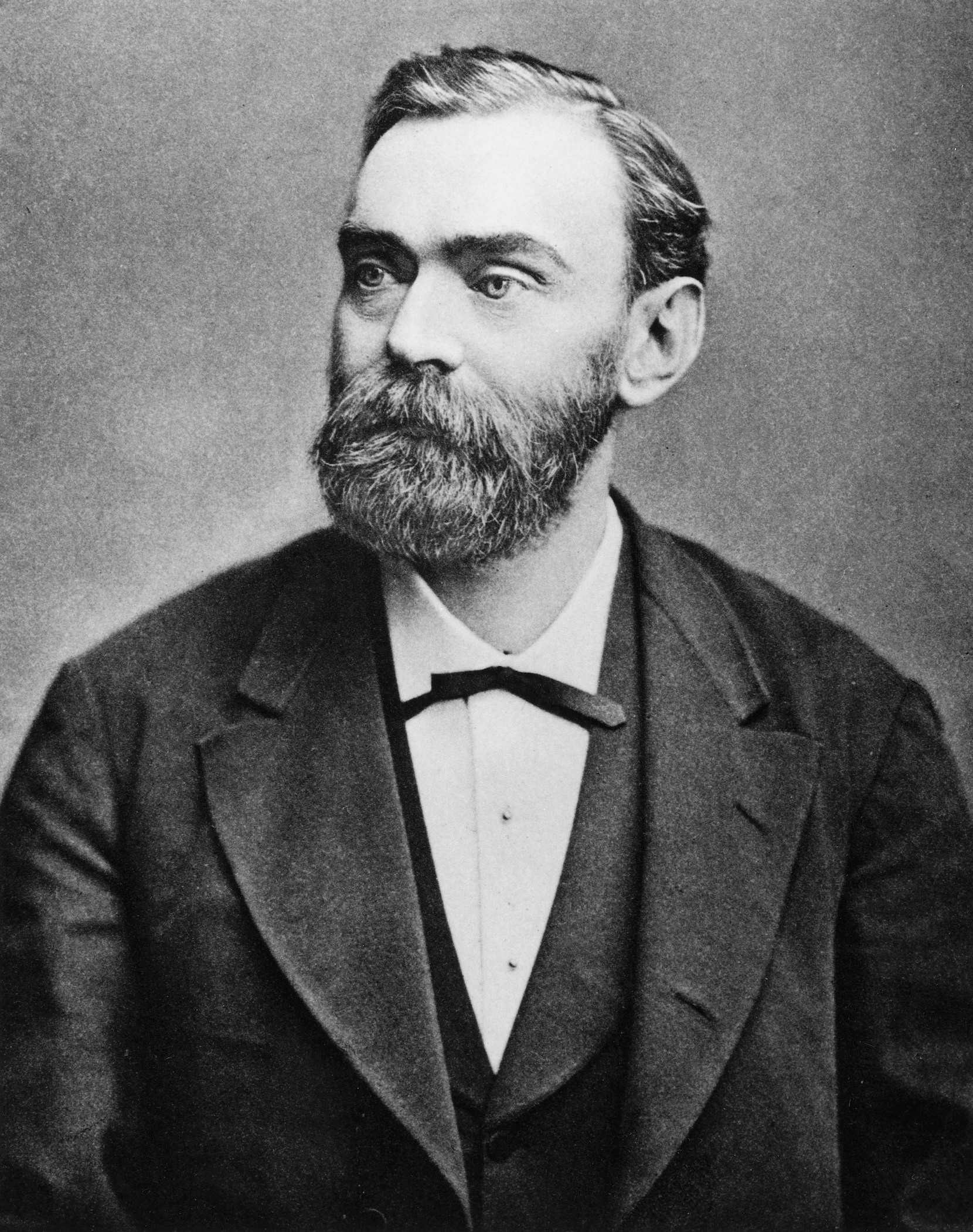
Alfred Nobel invents dynamite in 1866

== Births ==
=== January–March ===
- 10 January – Ludwig Aschoff, German physician and pathologist (d. 1942)
- 28 January – Georg Friederici (d. 1947)
- February – Karl Albert Buehr, painter (d. 1952)
- 6 March – Hans Christiansen, artist (d. 1947)
- 7 March – Hans Fruhstorfer, German lepidopterist (d. 1922)
- 13 March – Friedrich Boedicker, Vizeadmiral (vice admiral) (d. 1944)
- 15 March – Matthew Charlton, Australian politician (d. 1948)

=== April–June ===
- 11 April – Karl Bürger, German classical scholar (d. 1936)
- 22 April – Hans von Seeckt, German general (d. 1936)
- 23 May– Gustav Aschaffenburg, German psychiatrist (d. 1944)
- 8 June – Hermann Fenner-Behmer (d. 1913)
- 26 June – Josef Swickard, German actor (d. 1940 )

=== July–September ===
- 8 July – Benedict Friedlaender (d. 1908)
- 5 August – Carl Harries, German chemist (d. 1923)
- 16 September – Joe Vila, American sportswriter (d. 1934)
- 24 September –Max Bernhauer, German entomologist (d. 1946 )

=== October–December ===
- 27 October – Elsa Bernstein, Austrian-German writer and dramatist of Jewish descent. (d. 1949)
- 3 November – Paul Lincke, German composer (d. 1946)
- 20 November– Friedrich von Berg, German politician and chairman of the Secret Civil Cabinet of Kaiser Wilhelm II (d. 1939)
- 21 November – Hermann Boettcher, actor (d. 1935)
- 24 November – Rudolf Biebrach, German actor and film director (d. 1938)
- 12 December – Alfred Werner, German chemist, Nobel Prize laureate (d. 1919)

== Deaths ==
=== January–June ===
- 31 January – Friedrich Rückert, German poet, translator and professor of Oriental languages (b. 1788)
- 6 March – Theodor Brüggemann, Prussian government official and politician (b. 1796)

=== July–December ===
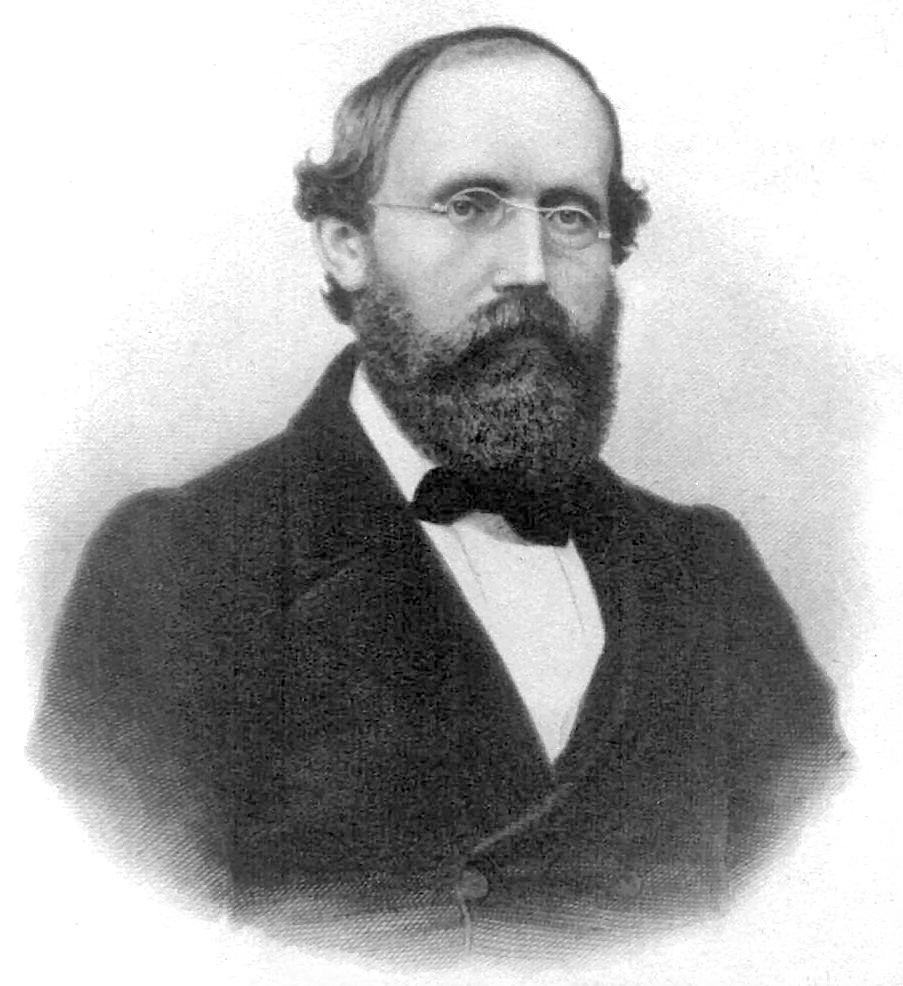
Bernhard Riemann

- 20 July – Bernhard Riemann, German mathematician (b. 1826)
- 30 August or 10 September – Hermann Goldschmidt, German-French astronomer and painter (b. 1802)
