= Gustav Müller (serial killer) =

German murderer and self-confessed serial killer

- Born: Gustav Carl Friedrich Müller; 1865; Germany
- Died: Unknown; Rotterdam, South Holland, Netherlands
- Penalty: Acquitted by reason of insanity

Details
- Victims: 2–18+
- Span of crimes: 1890–1897
- Country: Netherlands, possibly others
- State: South Holland
- Date apprehended: 1897 (surrendered)

Gustav Carl Friedrich Müller (Note: First name also spelled 'Gustave') (born 1865 in Germany – date of death unknown; in Rotterdam, Netherlands) was a German bigamist, murderer and self-confessed serial killer. When he surrendered himself to the police, Müller confessed to killing his wife and son, as well as his parents and other wives around the world. Only the murders of his wife and son were proven, but taking his insanity into consideration, Müller was acquitted by reason of insanity and sent off to a mental institution, where he presumably died.

== Early life and travels ==
Not much is known about Müller's early life, aside from the fact that he was born in an unspecified location in Germany, with his father being a foreman at the Prussian state railways. In 1888, he married a woman in Berlin, and they had one son.

Müller, a skilled artisan who worked as a watchmaker and gold miner, went bankrupt in January 1890, and quickly abandoned his wife. He travelled around the world, visiting many countries and supposedly marrying many women. Near the end of 1891, Müller was in India, riding an elephant, when he suddenly fell off the animal. Due to his injuries, he was placed in hospital for some time for treatment of epileptic seizures and an unspecified mental condition, from which, by his own admission, he never fully recovered.

=== Hospitalization in England ===
In March 1893, Müller boarded a ship from India towards England, passing through France on the way. The penniless watchmaker landed at Dover, and at the end of March, he found himself in London. A police constable named Ridgway found the man wandering around Southwark on 30 March and took Müller to the St. George's Workhouse on Mint Street.

There, Müller, speaking in German because he didn't know or understand English, explained to the doctor various fascinating tales, as well as professing that he butchered his parents, wife and several children. Most peculiarly, at times he even claimed that he had killed over 4,000 people, and that the police were hunting him down. His insane claims led the doctor to procure a certificate, with which Müller was sent away to the London County Lunatic Asylum in Banstead, on 15 April 1893. While in Banstead, his presence puzzled staff, as examinations proved that Müller was a healthy and mostly stable personality, not counting his suicidal thoughts, with no sign of any epileptic fits at all. He was considered a well-behaved patient, doing any given task without hesitation, but his perseverance in not understanding English, which hampered any investigation into his past, led a medical student by the name of Dr. Shaw, a fluent speaker of German and French, to question Müller.

While interviewed by Shaw, Müller explained his incident in India, and also took time to complain about the doctor from St. George's, who claimed that he had seen him talk to himself in a strange manner. Shaw noted that while Müller spoke clearly and intelligently, he was thorough and pretty genuine about having no friends in England; however, his claim that he was unmarried was not believed.

In May 1893, the secretary of the Prussian state railways sent a letter to Shaw, from Müller's family, in which they were eager to know if their loved one was suffering from an incurable disease. The good doctor replied that he was not as Müller's mental health seemingly improved, so much so that on 22 June 1893, a committee of visitors approved his release as "fully recovered". Shortly following his discharge, Müller's whereabouts were unknown, but he soon resurfaced and set off to Germany as a pauper. He returned to Berlin and managed to convince his wife to take him back and restore the family to what it had been. Müller also expressed interest in returning to his old line of work and finally settling down in life.

== Murder of Margaret Müller and son ==
However, the happiness did not last long. Towards the end of 1895, Gustav sent his wife away to a circus one evening, using her absence to steal 1,600 Deutsche Mark that she had inherited. He then fled with Margaret Hanneman and her 1-year-old son, who was secretly Gustav's child, settling first in Amsterdam before moving to Rotterdam. In both places, the family lived off the stolen money, but Müller still managed to get employment as a well-respected watchmaker.

In October 1897, while cleaning mussels for the lunch meal, Müller suddenly heard a voice telling him to cut his wife's throat. Feeling compelled to do that, he slashed Margaret's throat, nearly decapitating her, before repeating the process with his son. Realising what he had just done, he cut off both ears of the corpses, and quickly went to the police station.

== Arrest, confession and acquittal ==
Müller dashed into a police station, approached an on-duty officer, and exclaimed that he had just murdered his wife and child. When questioned on how he had done it, Gustav explained to the policeman, but thinking that he was either crazy or a drunkard, the officer laughed. Enraged, Müller pulled out the bloodied ears, and said that if they wanted to confirm his story, they should go to his house. He was arrested on the spot while the Police Department Chief Strang and two other policemen quickly travelled towards the confessed killer's house. Upon arrival, they found Mrs. Müller and the young boy's bodies, both nearly decapitated, and the room splattered with blood.

Chief Strang then returned to the station and placed Müller under examination. Without hesitation, Gustav explained that he had murdered not just them, but also his parents, other wives and an uncertain number of children. After he finished confessing, he stood silent. From that point, he refused to eat anything as he viewed that as his only viable attempt at suicide.

The police considered his story as credible, suspecting that other murders were committed in the Orient. However, nothing could be confirmed with certainty, and his parents were found to be still living in Germany. On December 2, 1897, the District Court of Rotterdam acquitted Müller of the double homicide by reason of insanity and sent him off to an unspecified asylum, where it is presumed he later died.

== See also ==
- List of serial killers by country
