= Behmer =

Behmer is a surname. Notable people with the surname include:

- Anke Behmer (born 1961), German athlete
- Ernst Behmer (1875–1938), German stage and film actor
- Hermann Fenner-Behmer (1866–1913), German artist
- Marcus Behmer (1879–1958), German writer and book illustrator, graphic designer and painter
