= Mobile magazine explosion =

1865 explosion in Mobile, Alabama, U.S.

Location of the warehouse and surrounding buildings

On May 25, 1865, in Mobile, Alabama, in the Southern United States, an ordnance depot or "magazine" exploded, killing some 300 persons. This event occurred just before the end of the American Civil War, during the occupation of the city by Federal troops.

The depot was a warehouse on Beauregard Street, where the troops had stacked some 200 tons of shells and powder. Some time in the afternoon of May 25, a cloud of black smoke rose into the air and the ground began to rumble. Flames shot up into the sky and bursting shells were heard throughout the city. In the nearby Mobile River, two ships sank, and a man standing on a wharf was blown into the river. Several houses collapsed from the concussion.

A reporter for The Mobile Morning News newspaper described "bursting shells, flying timbers, bales of cotton, horses, men, women, and children co-mingled and mangled into one immense mass". He continued: "The heart stood still, and the stoutest cheek paled as this rain of death fell from the sky and crash after crash foretold a more fearful fate yet impending ... old and young, soldier and citizen vied with each other in deeds of daring to rescue the crumbled and imprisoned."

On the heels of the explosion came fires, which burned until the entire northern part of Mobile lay in smoking ruins. A huge hole where the warehouse once stood remained for many years, a reminder of the disaster.

The exact cause of the magazine explosion was never determined. Some northern newspapers tried to pin the blame on an imagined gang of unreconstructed Confederate officers. Most people, though, accepted that it was the result of simple carelessness on the part of workers handling wheelbarrows full of live ammunition.

== See also ==
- Largest artificial non-nuclear explosions
