= Hemshof =

City district of Ludwigshafen Am Rhein, Germany

Coordinates: 49°29′18″N 8°26′01″E

Hemshof is one of the oldest city districts of Ludwigshafen Am Rhein, Germany. It is located above the "Nord" district. The first settlement in Hemshof is believed to have been built by the Celts in 516, not as a city but as a small farm. In the 19th century the Hemshof became an important living district for the workers in the BASF.

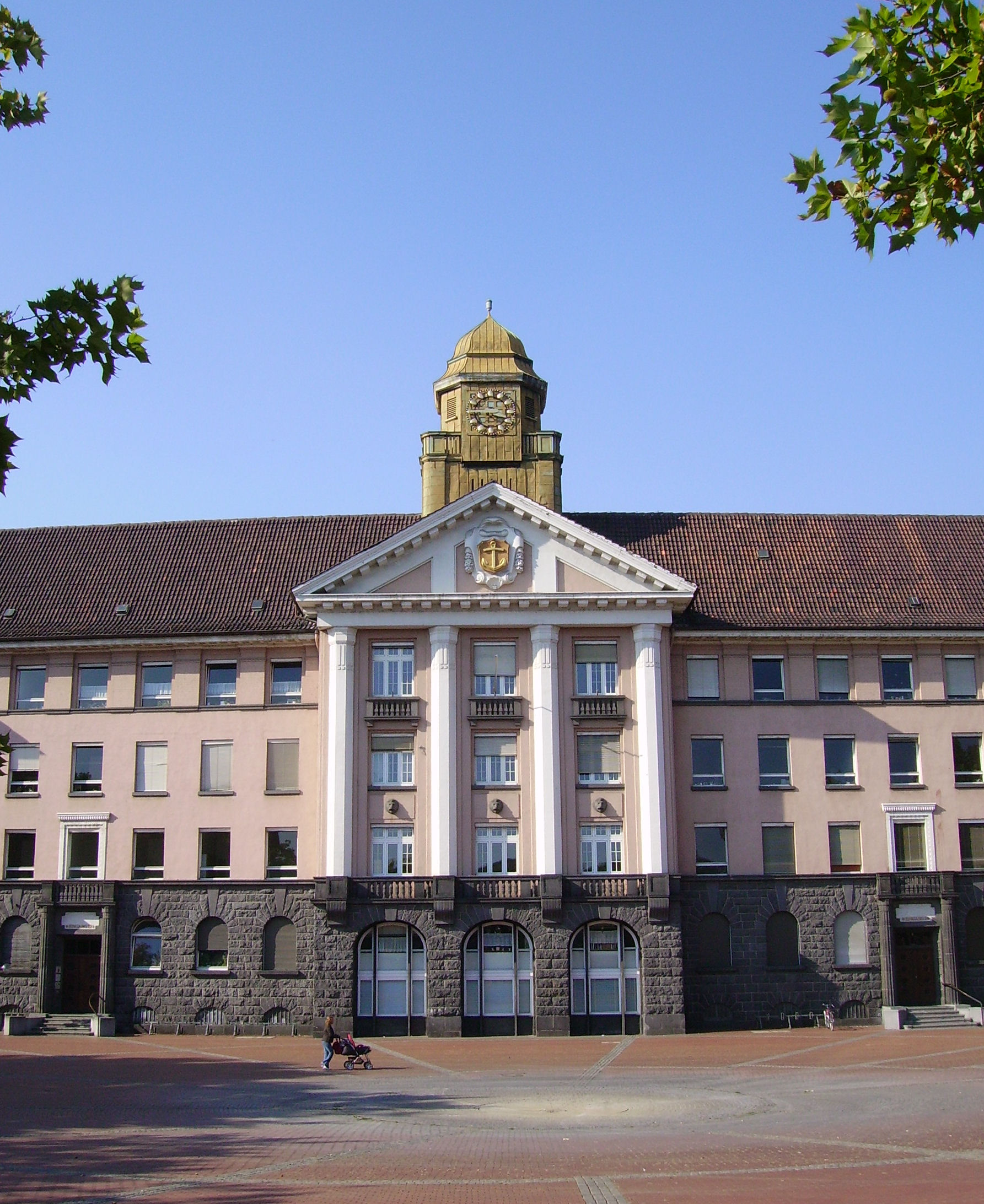
Stadthaus Nord

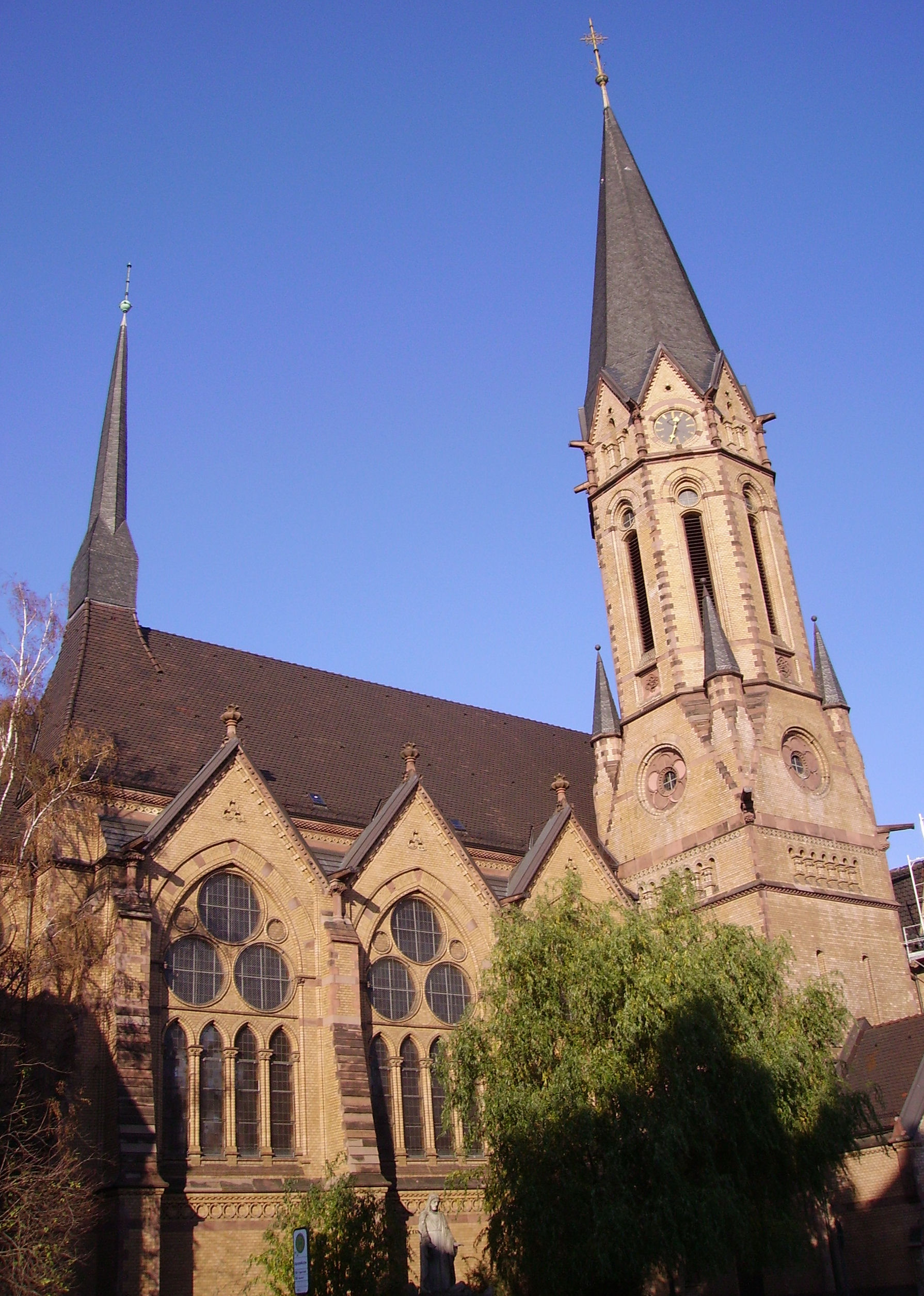
Apostelkirche

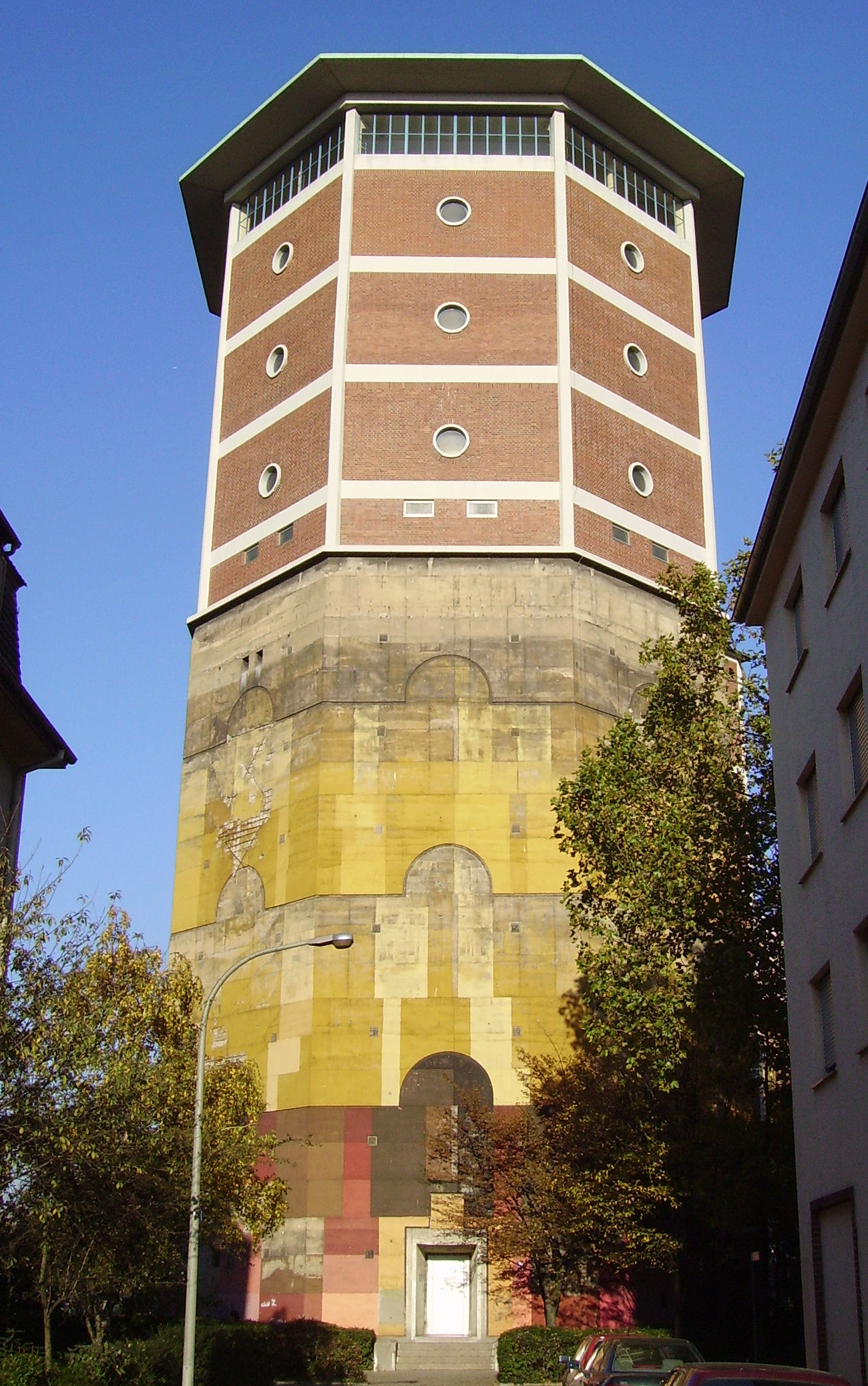
water tower

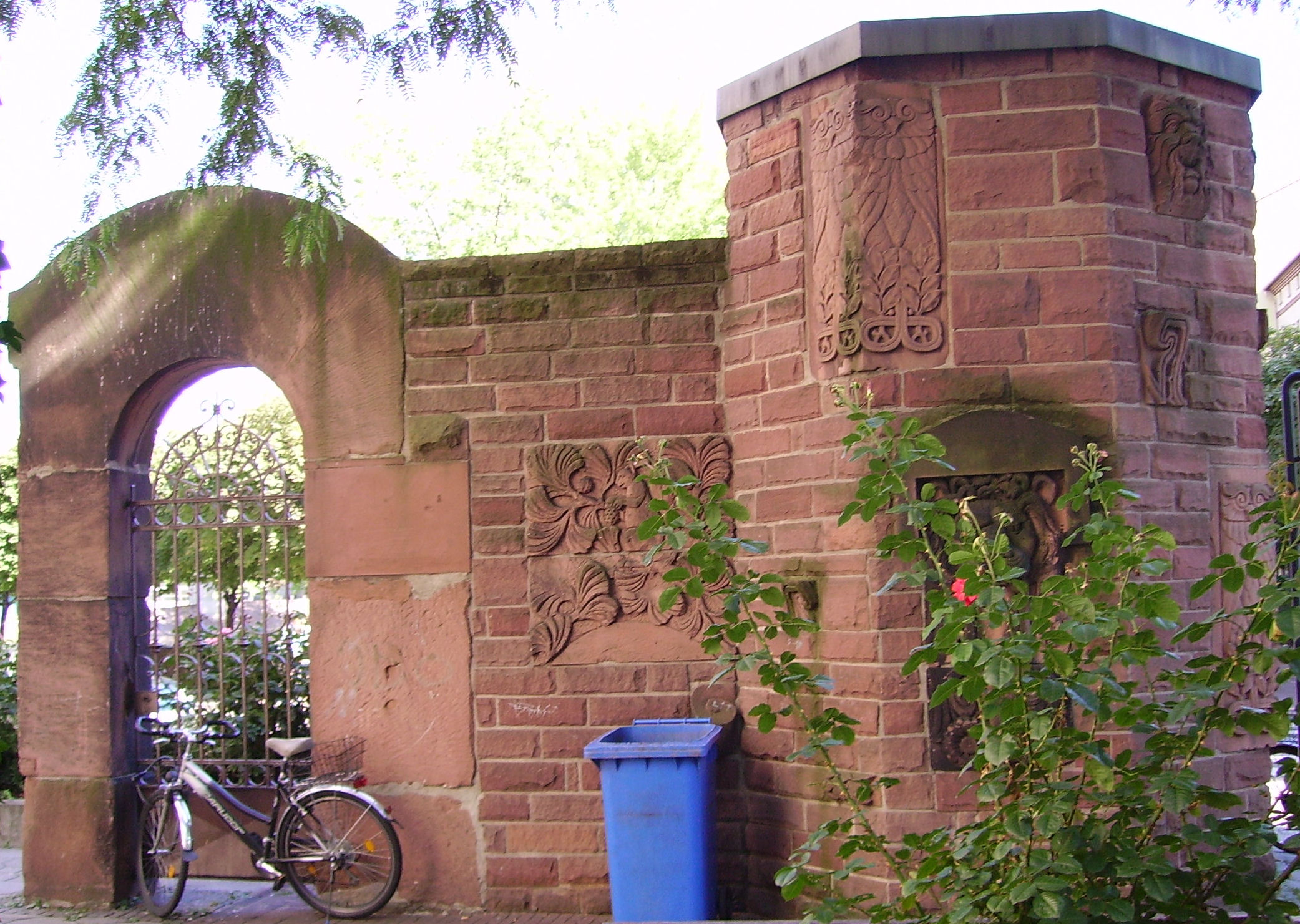
gate
