= Hermann Fenner-Behmer =

German painter (1866-1913)

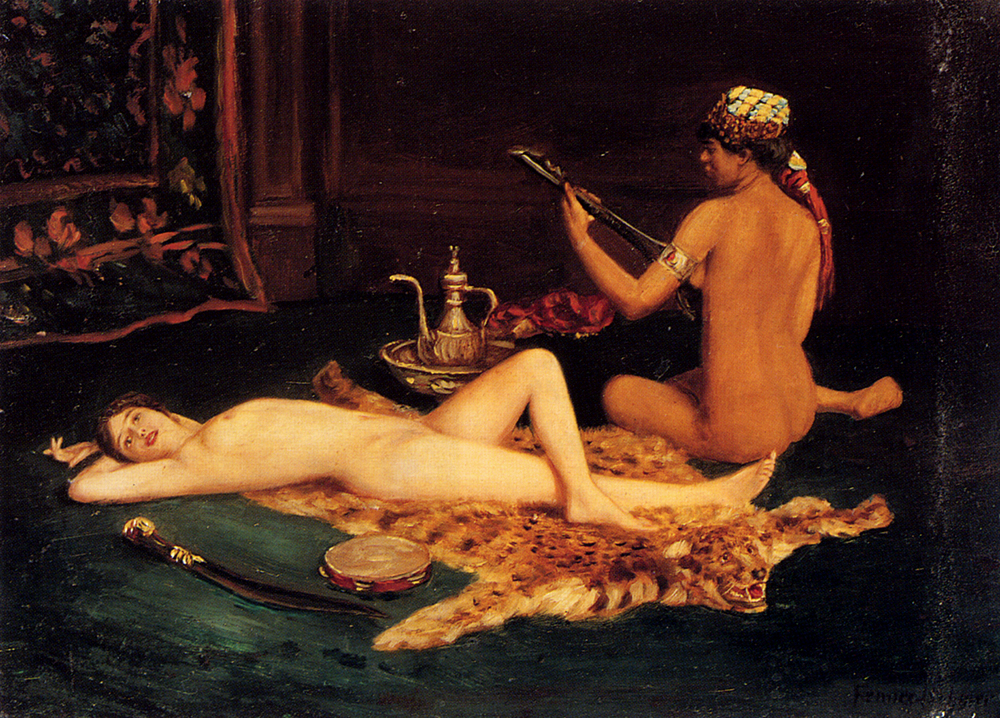
Reclining Odalisque by Hermann Fenner-Behmer

Hermann Fenner-Behmer (8 June 1866 – 3 February 1913) was a German artist. He was born and died in Berlin.

Fenner-Behmer spent his career in Berlin. He studied at the Royal Academy of Arts, and then after further studies in Paris with Gustave Boulanger and Jules-Joseph Lefebvre, toured Italy, Belgium and the Netherlands. At the Berlin Art Exhibition of 1908 he was one of six winners of the Gold Medal of the Royal Academy of Arts for his painting Dame in Braun (Lady in Brown), and he won a further gold medal at the Berlin exhibition of 1912.

Fenner-Behmer specialized in portraits of elegant ladies and in erotic scenes. Many of his works were reproduced as photogravures. Some of his settings are in an oriental environment. "Orientalism" refers to the Orient or East, in contrast to the Occident or West, and often, as seen by the West.

Many Western 19th-century artists specialized in "Oriental" subjects, often drawing on their travels to Western Asia, in the 19th century, especially in France. More open sensuality was seen as acceptable in the exotic Orient. This imagery persisted in art into the early 20th century. In many of these works, they portrayed the Orient as exotic, colorful and sensual.

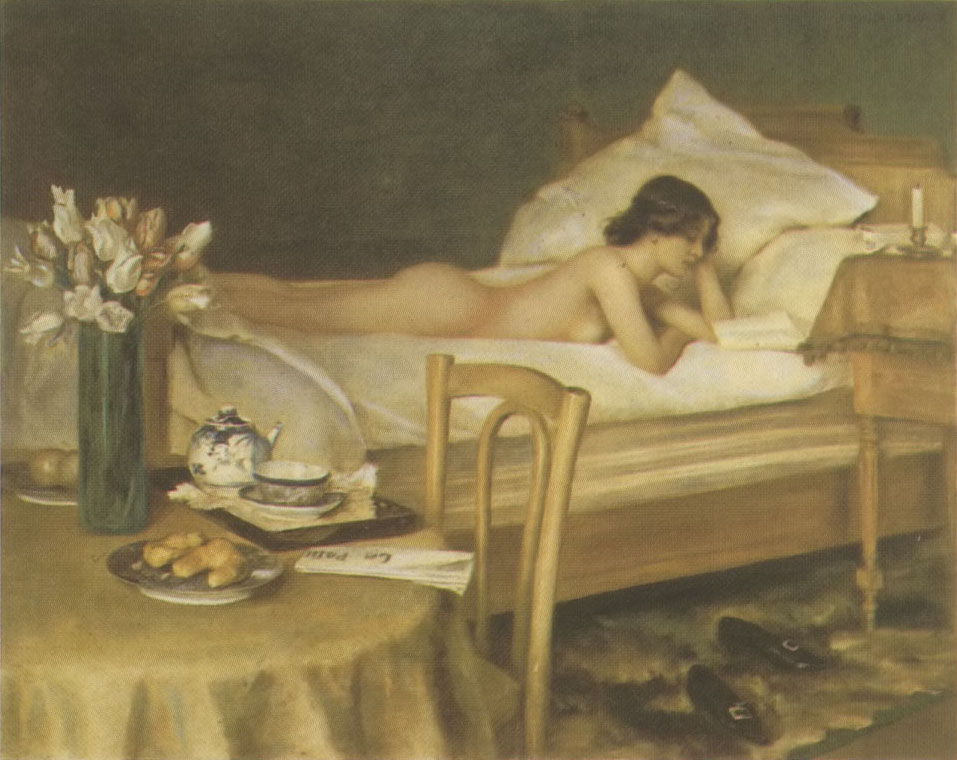

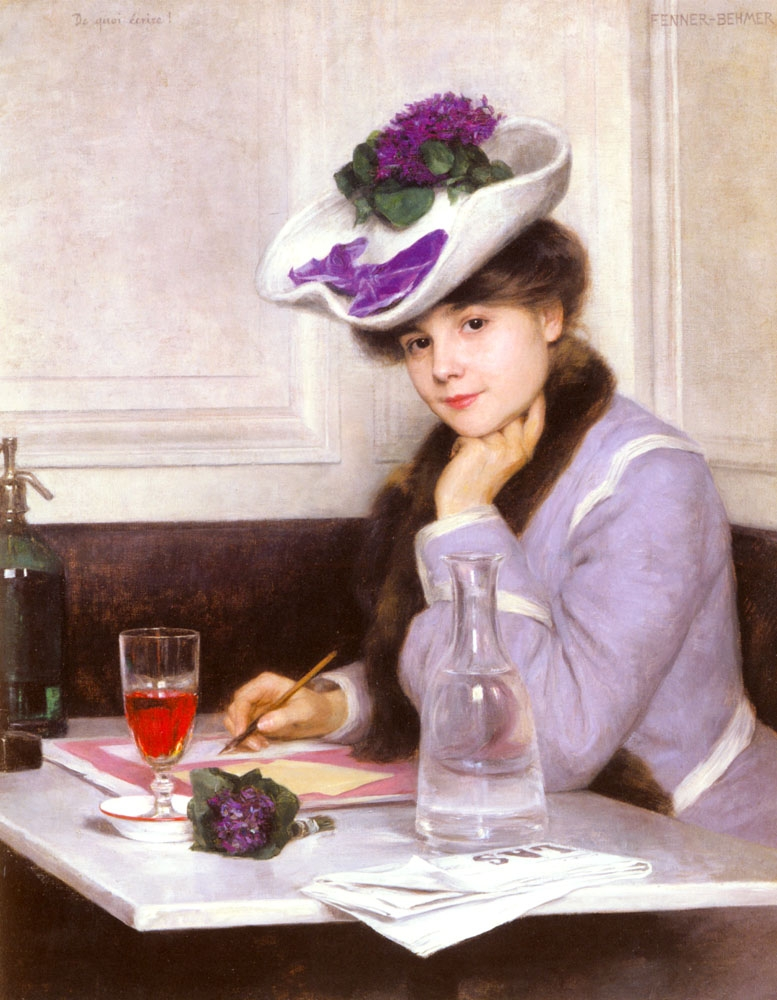

== Sources ==
- I. Berndt. "Fenner-Behmer, Hermann", in Allgemeine Künstlerlexikon, vol. 38, p. 182. Munich/Leipzig: Saur, 2003, ISBN 978-3-598-22778-3 (in German)
