= 1872 in Germany =

- Decades: 1850s; 1860s; 1870s; 1880s; 1890s
- See also: Other events of 1872; History of Germany • Timeline • Years

Events from the year 1872 in Germany.

== Incumbents ==
=== National level ===
- Emperor – William I
- Chancellor – Otto von Bismarck

=== State level ===
==== Kingdoms ====
- King of Bavaria – Ludwig II
- King of Prussia – William I
- King of Saxony – John
- King of Württemberg – Charles

==== Grand Duchies ====
- Grand Duke of Baden – Frederick I
- Grand Duke of Hesse – Louis III
- Grand Duke of Mecklenburg-Schwerin – Frederick Francis II
- Grand Duke of Mecklenburg-Strelitz – Frederick William
- Grand Duke of Oldenburg – Peter II
- Grand Duke of Saxe-Weimar-Eisenach – Charles Alexander

==== Principalities ====
- Schaumburg-Lippe – Adolf I, Prince of Schaumburg-Lippe
- Schwarzburg-Rudolstadt – George Albert, Prince of Schwarzburg-Rudolstadt
- Schwarzburg-Sondershausen – Günther Friedrich Karl II, Prince of Schwarzburg-Sondershausen
- Principality of Lippe – Leopold III, Prince of Lippe
- Reuss Elder Line – Heinrich XXII, Prince Reuss of Greiz
- Reuss Younger Line – Heinrich XIV, Prince Reuss Younger Line
- Waldeck and Pyrmont – George Victor, Prince of Waldeck and Pyrmont

==== Duchies ====
- Duke of Anhalt – Frederick I, Duke of Anhalt
- Duke of Brunswick – William, Duke of Brunswick
- Duke of Saxe-Altenburg – Ernst I, Duke of Saxe-Altenburg
- Duke of Saxe-Coburg and Gotha – Ernest II, Duke of Saxe-Coburg and Gotha
- Duke of Saxe-Meiningen – Georg II, Duke of Saxe-Meiningen

== Events ==
- 4 July – Jesuits Law is promulgated
- 12 November – Dresdner Bank is founded

=== Science ===
- Richard Dedekind publishes Stetigkeit und irrationale Zahlen, a theory of irrational numbers.
- Felix Klein produces the Erlangen program on geometries.
- Ludwig Boltzmann states the Boltzmann equation for the temporal development of distribution functions in phase space, and publishes his H-theorem.
- Polyvinyl chloride is accidentally synthesised by German chemist Eugen Baumann.

=== Undated ===
- Radeberger Brewery is opened

== Births ==
- 11 January
  - Georg Karo, German archaeologist (died 1963)
  - Paul Graener, German composer and conductor (died 1944)
- 19 January – Heinrich Laufenberg, German politician and historian (died 1932)
- 23 January – Paul Mebes, German architect (died 1938)
- 28 January – Otto Braun, German politician (died 1955)
- 8 February – Theodor Lessing, German philosopher (died 1933)
- 2 March – Rudolf Helm, German classical philologist (died 1966)
- 3 March
  - Wilhelm Ahrens, German mathematician (died 1927)
  - Frida Felser, opera singer and actress (died 1941).
- 10 March – Camillo Schumann, German composer and organist (died 1946)
- 13 March – Joseph Rosemeyer, German track cyclist (died 1919)
- 20 March – Bernhard Goldenberg, German engineer (died 1917)
- 24 March – Walther Reinhardt, Army officer (died 1930)
- 1 April – Conrad Gröber, German bishop of Roman-Catholic Church (died 1948)
- 5 April – Emmy von Egidy, German sculptor and writer (died 1946)
- 9 April – Theodor Koch-Grunberg, German ethnologue and explorer (died 1924)
- 19 April – Alice Salomon, German social reformer (died 1948)
- 22 April – Princess Margaret of Prussia, Prussian princess (died 1954)
- 25 April – Albrecht Bethe. Germany physiologist (died 1954)
- 2 May – Karl Nessler, German inventor of the permanent wave (died 1951)
- 14 June – Heinrich Vogeler, German painter (died 1942)
- 22 July – Karl Helfferich, German politician (died 1924)
- 13 August – Richard Willstätter, German chemist, Nobel Prize laureate (died 1942)
- 5 September – Carl Friedrich von Siemens, German entrepreneur (died 1941)
- 3 October – Hermann Anschütz-Kaempfe, German scientist and inventor (died 1931)
- 9 November – Richard Otto, German physician (died 1952)
- 11 November – Frederick Stock, German composer (died 1942)

== Deaths ==
- 1 April – Hugo von Mohl, German botanist (born 1805)
- 13 May – Moritz Hartmann, German poet and author (born 1821)
- 24 May – Julius Schnorr von Carolsfeld, German painter (born 1794)
- 21 August – David Kalisch, German playwright and humorist (born 1820)
- 13 September – Ludwig Feuerbach, German philosopher and anthropologist (born 1804)
- 14 October – Prince Albert of Prussia, German nobleman and Prussian general (born 1809)
