= Johann Georg Seitz =

- Still life with fruit, 1861
- Born: 14 March 1810; Nuremberg, Kingdom of Bavaria
- Died: 16 April 1870 (aged 60); Wienna, Austria-Hungary
- Known for: Painting, drawing, printmaking
- Notable work: Still fife with fruits, Still fifes with flowers
- Movement: Biedermeier, Realism, Academic art

Johann Georg Seitz (14 March 1810, Nuremberg – 16 April 1870, Vienna) was a German-Austrian painter known primarily for his still-life compositions featuring fruit, flowers, and insects. His works, typically executed in oil on canvas, reflect the detailed realism and refined aesthetic characteristic of mid‑19th‑century Central European still-life painting.

== Biography ==
Johann Georg Seitz was born in Nuremberg in 1810. Although documentation is limited, he is believed to have studied at the Academy of Fine Arts in Vienna, where he later exhibited several works. Seitz spent much of his career in Vienna, producing still lifes that were appreciated for their precision, harmonious composition, and rich coloration.

He died in Vienna in 1870. Contemporary obituaries described him not only as a skilled still-life painter but also as an “excellent landscape painter.”

== Artistic Work ==
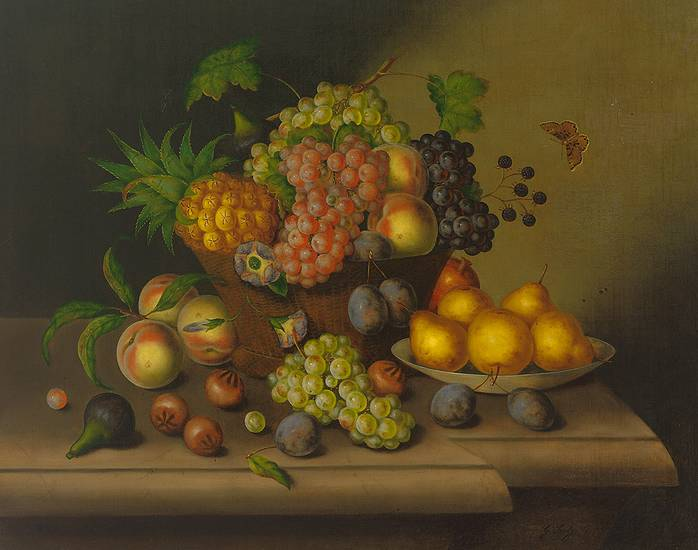
Fruit Still Life with Insects

Seitz's oeuvre consists mainly of fruit and flower still lifes, often arranged with meticulous attention to texture, light, and natural detail. His paintings frequently include grapes, peaches, plums, pears, and other fruits, sometimes accompanied by insects or decorative objects.

One representative work is:

- Früchtestilleben mit Insekten, Trauben, Pfirsichen, Pflaumen, Birnen und Ananas in Weidenkorb und auf Teller – a fruit still life featuring insects, grapes, peaches, plums, pears, and a pineapple arranged in a wicker basket and on a plate.

Movement, style: Realism, Biedermeier, Academic art

== Exhibitions ==
Several of Seitz's works were exhibited at the Vienna Academy:

- 1830: A watercolor Früchtestück (fruit piece)
- 1842: Two oil paintings, Rosen (roses) and Blumen (flowers)

These exhibitions contributed to his recognition within the artistic circles of Vienna.

== Legacy ==
Although not widely known today, Johann Georg Seitz remains a representative figure of 19th‑century Austrian-German still-life painting. His works occasionally appear in Central European art auctions and are valued for their craftsmanship and decorative appeal.
