= Edmund Wodick =

German painter

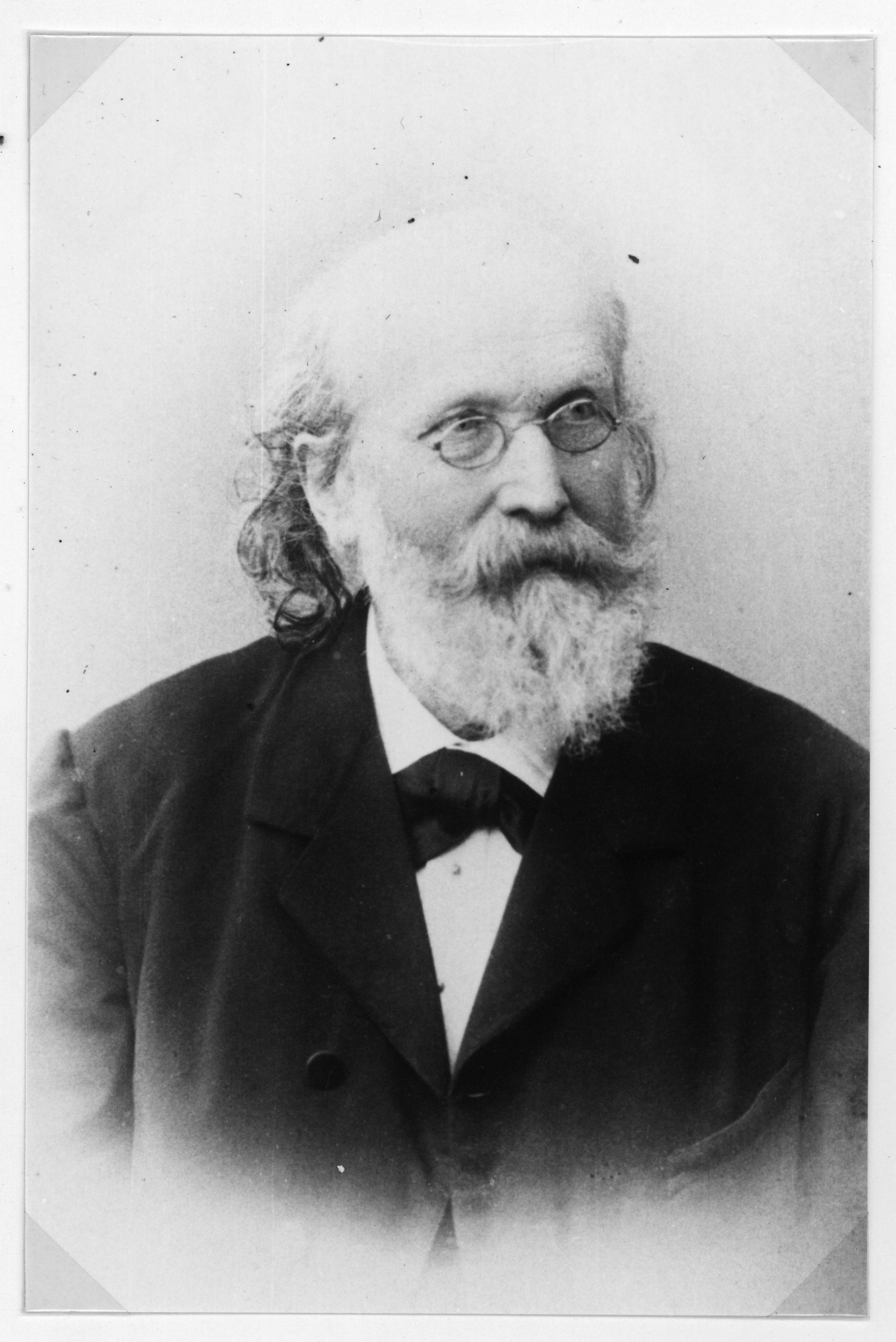
Edmund Wodick (date unknown)

Edmund Ludwig Eduard Wodick (21 November 1816, in Bebertal – 10 March 1886, in Magdeburg) was a German painter of the Biedermeier period, known for landscapes, portraits and genre scenes.

== Biography ==
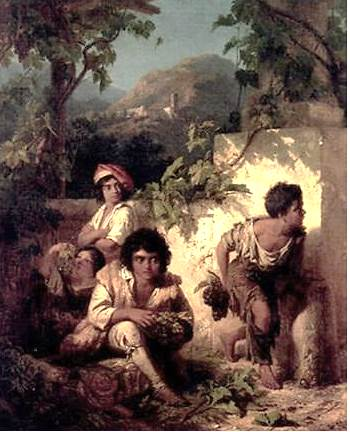
Stealing from the Grape Harvest

His father was a decorative painter who gave him his first lessons. After attending the Arts and Crafts school in Magdeburg, he was apprenticed to a lithographer. Before he had completed his training, the music publisher, Wilhelm von Heinrichshofen (1782-1881), a distant relative, helped him to enroll at the Kunstakademie Düsseldorf and study with Friedrich Wilhelm Schadow. He was there from 1837 to 1841. Karl Ferdinand Sohn and Rudolf Wiegmann were also among his instructors.

Following graduation, he embarked on the "Grand Tour", beginning with Paris. While there, he took evening classes from Paul Delaroche and made copies at the Louvre. In 1842, he took part in an exhibition at the Salon. Following that, he visited Switzerland and Northern Italy, finally making his way to Rome, where he spent a year and a half, making sketches and studying the sculptures. He also worked as a portraitist, receiving orders from King Ludwwig I and Prince Henry of Prussia. After leaving Rome, he toured Spain and visited Morocco. While in Madrid, he became acquainted with José de Madrazo, Director of the Museo del Prado.

He returned to Magdeburg by way of France in 1846, married his childhood sweetheart, and opened a studio which became a meeting place for artists, writers and theatrical performers. His works from this period are largely Spanish and Orientalist in theme. Later, he established himself as a portrait painter. His sitters included many local businessmen, clergy and politicians as well as King (later, Kaiser) Wilhelm I, although that portrait was lost and is now known only through a copper engraving.

He was a member of numerous art societies and, in 1859, founded "Athene", an association for "art, science and humor". During the 1860s and 1870s, he travelled throughout and made lengthy stays in the mountains of Bavaria, Austria and Switzerland (notably the Harz Region), filling sketchbooks with drawings and watercolors. Two years after his wife's death in 1884, he succumbed to complications following a bout with pneumonia. Many of his works were lost during the two world wars, but an extensive collection still exists at the Kulturhistorisches Museum Magdeburg.

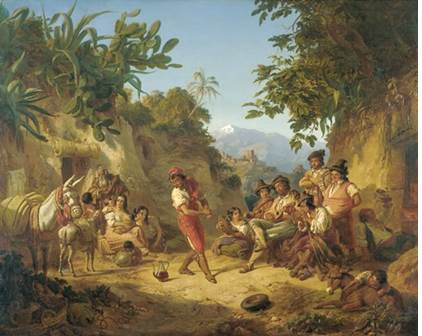
Tambourine Dance in the Mountains near Málaga

== Sources ==
- Lisa Hackmann: "Wodick, Edmund", in: Bénédicte Savoy and France Nerlich (Eds.): Pariser Lehrjahre. Ein Lexikon zur Ausbildung deutscher Maler in der französischen Hauptstadt. Vol.1: 1793-1843. De Gruyter, 2013, ISBN 978-3-11-029057-8, S. 316-318.
- Matthias Puhle (Ed.): Edmund Wodick (1816–1886). Ein Magdeburger Maler des späten Biedermeier. Mitteldeutscher Verlag, 2011, ISBN 978-3-89812-792-9 (Exhibition catalog, Kulturhistorisches Museum Magdeburg)
- Sabine Liebscher. In the Magdeburger Biographisches Lexikon, Magdeburg 2002, ISBN 3-933046-49-1
