= Biedermeier =

19th-century art movement from Central Europe

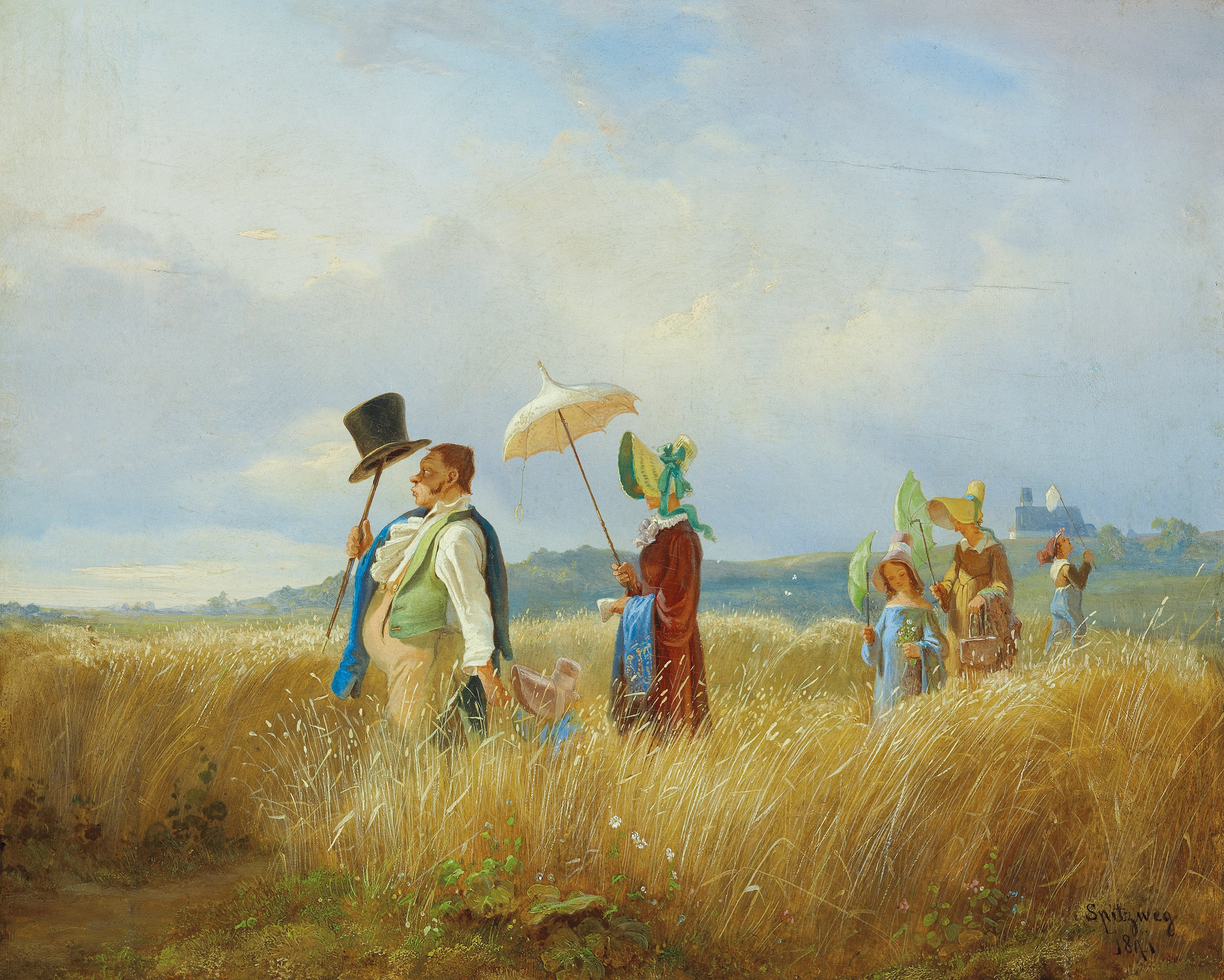
- Der Sonntagsspaziergang painting by Carl Spitzweg, a typical representation of the Biedermeier period (1841)

Additional media
- Years active: 1815–1848
- Location: German Confederation
- Influences: Empire style
- Influenced: Świdermajer

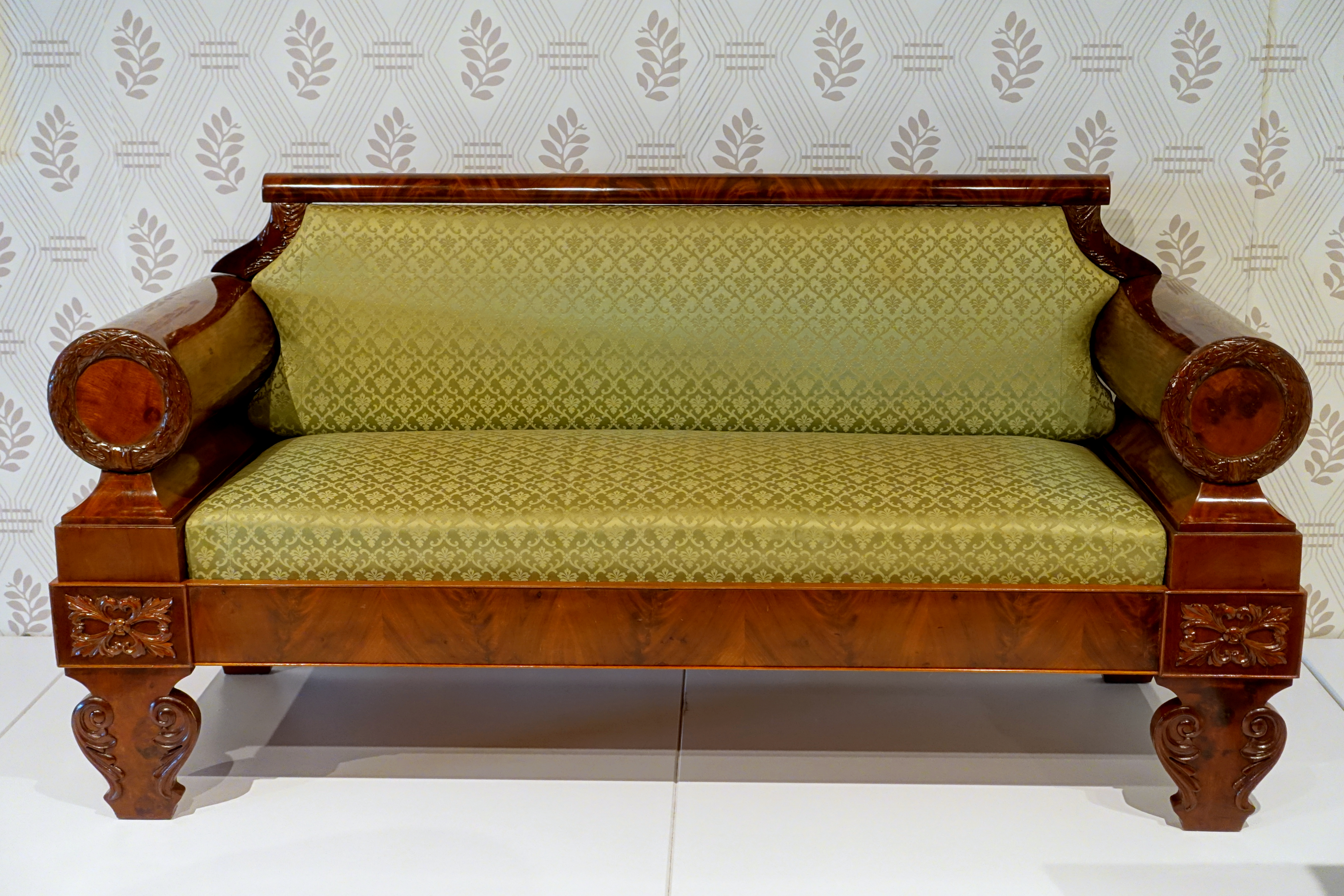
Austrian Biedermeier sofa, c. 1815–1825, mahogany, upholstery (not original), Montreal Museum of Fine Arts (Montreal, Canada)

The Biedermeier period was an era in the art and culture of the German Confederation between 1815 and 1848 during which the middle classes grew in number and artists began producing works appealing to their sensibilities. The period began with the end of the Napoleonic Wars in 1815 and ended with the onset of the Revolutions of 1848. The term originated in popular literature, before spreading to architecture, interior design, and visual arts.

"Biedermeier" derives from the fictional mediocre poet Gottlieb Biedermaier [sic], who was featured in the Munich magazine Fliegende Blätter (Flying Leaves). It is used mostly to denote the unchallenging artistic styles that flourished in the fields of literature, music, the visual arts and interior design. The name is a reference to Biedermann (a German surname, originally meaning "brave, honest or capable man", but came to mean "boring person, petty bourgeois") and meier (a generic German surname).

As is natural in cultural creative movements, Biedermeier has influenced later styles.

== Political background ==
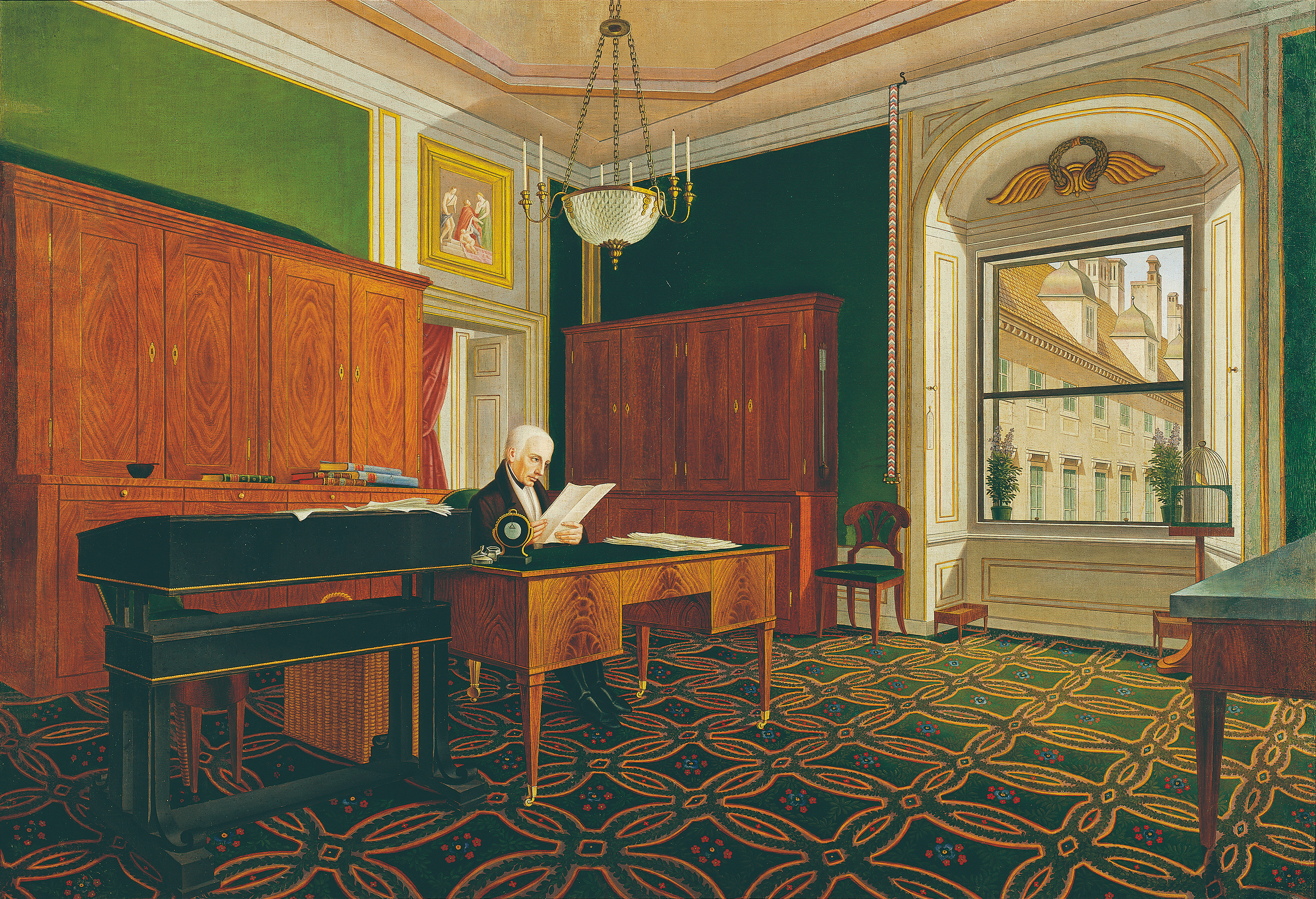
Emperor Francis I of Austria in his study at the Hofburg Palace. The interior is in the Biedermeier style. The Concert of Europe, ensured by the Austrian chancellor and foreign minister Klemens von Metternich, enabled the period of peace in which Biedermeier sensibilities developed.

The Biedermeier period does not refer to the era as a whole, but to a particular mood and set of trends that grew out of the unique underpinnings of the time in Central Europe. There were two driving forces for the development of the period. One was the growing urbanization and industrialization leading to a new urban middle class, which created a new kind of audience for the arts. The other was the political stability prevalent under Klemens von Metternich following the end of the Napoleonic Wars and the Congress of Vienna.

The effect was for artists and society in general to concentrate on the domestic and, at least in public, the non-political. Writers, painters, and musicians began to stay in safer territory, and the emphasis on home life for the growing middle class meant a blossoming of furniture design and interior decorating.

== Aesthetic standards ==
The affluent middle class values that are associated with Biedermeier include affection, sensibility, moderation, and modesty. Biedermeier Gemütlichkeit means that one reaches a state of cosiness as well as friendliness.

== Family values ==
Biedermeier family values reflected the bourgeois consensus, and the housewife was responsible for furnishing and choosing the appropriate design. Middle-class women were held responsible for family cohesion and children had to be socialized within the family.

== Literature ==
The term Biedermeier appeared first in literary circles in the form of a pseudonym, Gottlieb Biedermaier, used by the country doctor Adolf Kussmaul and lawyer Ludwig Eichrodt in poems that the duo had published in the Munich satirical weekly Fliegende Blätter in 1850. The German word bieder translates into plain, while Maier is a common bourgeois surname.

The verses parodied the people of the era, namely Samuel Friedrich Sauter, a primary teacher and sort of amateurish poet, as depoliticized and petit-bourgeois. The name was constructed from the titles of two poems—"Biedermanns Abendgemütlichkeit" (Biedermann's Evening Comfort) and "Bummelmaiers Klage" (Bummelmaier's Complaint)—which Joseph Victor von Scheffel had published in 1848 in the same magazine.

As a label for the epoch, the term has been used since around 1900.

Due to the strict control of publication and official censorship, Biedermeier writers concerned themselves primarily with non-political subjects, like historical fiction and country life. Political discussion was usually confined to the home, in the presence of close friends.

Typical Biedermeier poets are Annette von Droste-Hülshoff, Friedrich Halm, Adelbert von Chamisso, Eduard Mörike, and Wilhelm Müller, the last three of whom have well-known musical settings by Robert Schumann, Hugo Wolf and Franz Schubert respectively. Adalbert Stifter was a novelist and short story writer whose work also reflected the concerns of the Biedermeier movement, particularly with his novel Der Nachsommer. As historian Carl Emil Schorske put it, "To illustrate and propagate his concept of Bildung, compounded of Benedictine world piety, German humanism, and Biedermeier conventionality, Stifter gave to the world his novel Der Nachsommer".

Jeremias Gotthelf published The Black Spider in 1842 as an allegorical work that uses Gothic themes. It is Gotthelf's best known work. At first little noticed, the story is now considered by many critics to be among the masterworks of Biedermeier era and sensibility.

== Furniture design and interior decorating ==
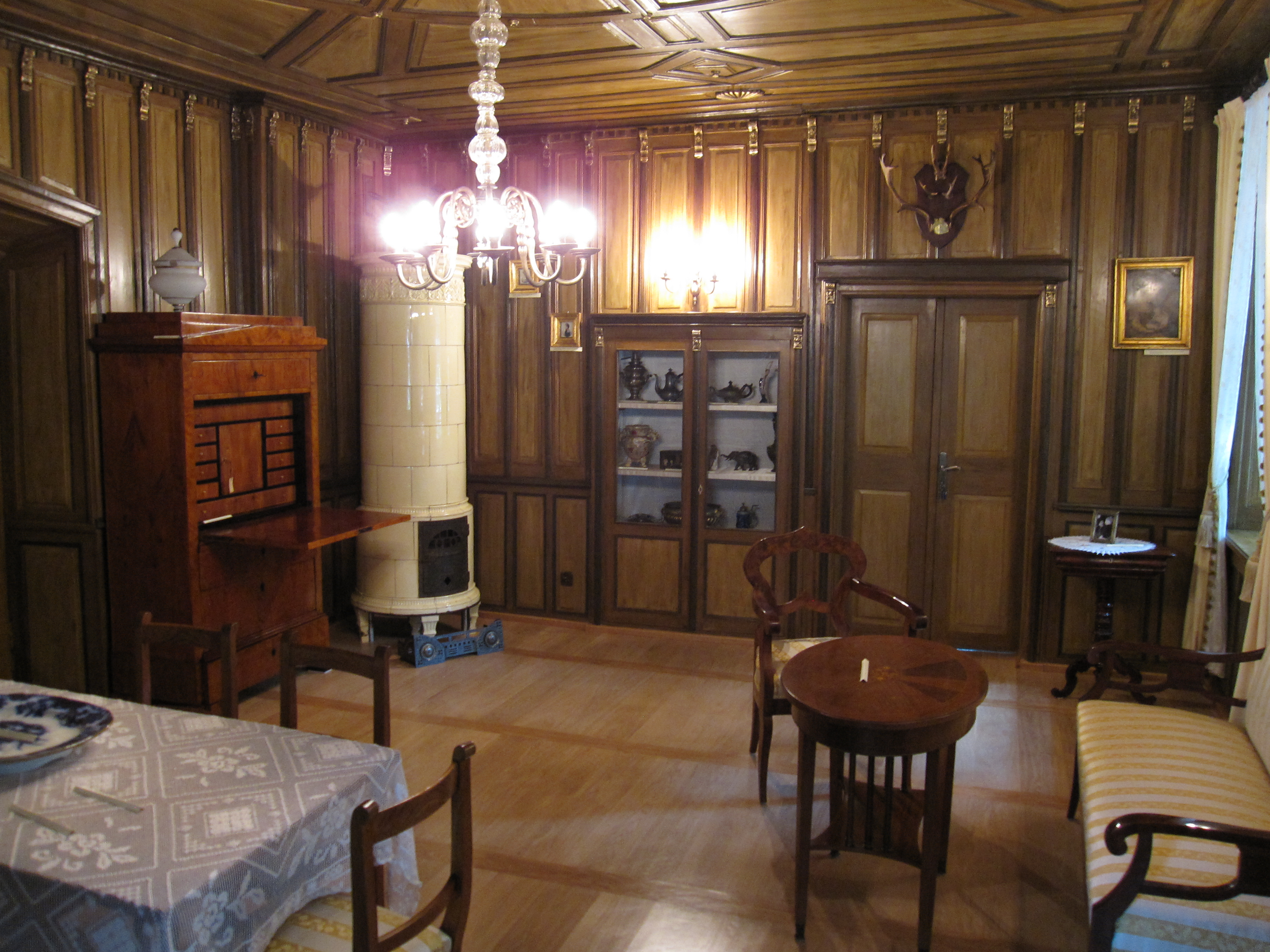
Biedermeier room in the museum of Chrzanów, Poland

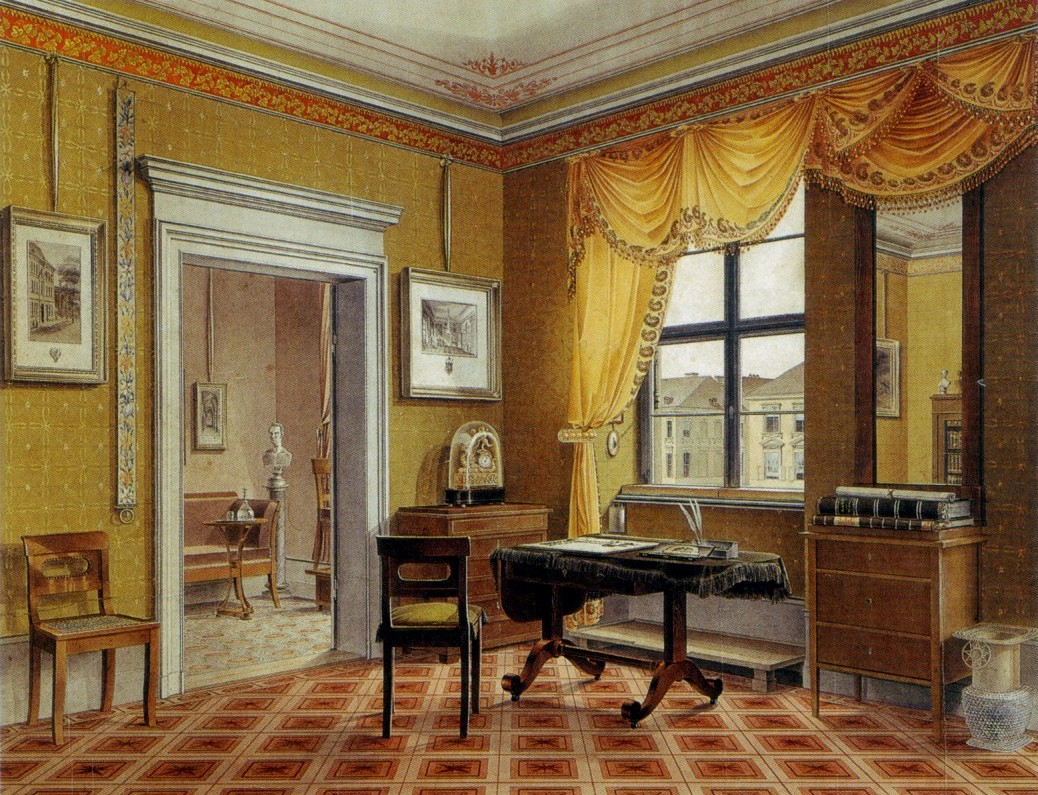
Zimmerbild (chamber painting) of a Biedermeier interior in Berlin: fitted carpets, unified window, and pier-mirror draperies, and framed engravings in a restrained classicising style, around 1825, by Leopold Zielcke (1791–1861)

Biedermeier furniture is admired for quality craftsmanship and comfort. Original early 19th century Biedermeier furniture was manufactured to be publicly displayed, with less concern for convenience and private enjoyment. Biedermeier upholstery makes extensive use of coil-springs. Biedermeier furniture design was purchased or commissioned by the prosperous middle class to celebrate comfort and leisure.

Middle to late-Biedermeier furniture design represented a heralding towards historicism and revival eras long sought for. Social forces originating in France would change the artisan-patron system that achieved this period of design, first in the German states, and then into Scandinavia. The middle class growth originated in the Industrial Revolution in Britain and many Biedermeier designs owe their simplicity to Georgian lines of the 19th century, as the proliferation of design publications reached the German states and the Austrian Empire.

The Biedermeier style was a simplified interpretation of the influential French Empire style of Napoleon, which introduced the romance of ancient Roman Empire styles, adapting these to modern early 19th century households. Biedermeier furniture used locally available materials such as cherry, ash, and oak woods rather than the expensive timbers such as fully imported mahogany.

Unique designs were created in Vienna. Furniture from the earlier period (1815–1830) was the most severe and neoclassical in inspiration. It also supplied the most fantastic forms which the second half of the period (1830–1848) lacked, being influenced by the many style publications from Britain. Biedermeier furniture was the first style in the world that emanated from the growing middle class. It preceded Victoriana and influenced mainly German-speaking countries.

In Sweden, Jean-Baptiste Bernadotte, who was adopted by King Charles XIII (who was childless), became Sweden's new king in 1818 as Karl XIV Johan. The Swedish Karl Johan style, similar to Biedermeier, retained its elegant and blatantly Napoleonic style throughout the 19th century.

Biedermeier furniture and lifestyle was a focus on exhibitions at the Vienna applied arts museum in 1896. The many visitors to this exhibition were so influenced by this fantasy style and its elegance that a new resurgence or revival period became popular amongst European cabinetmakers. This revival period lasted up until the Art Deco style was taken up. Biedermeier also influenced the various Bauhaus styles through their truth in material philosophy.

The original Biedermeier period changed with the political unrests of 1845–1848 (its end date). With the revolutions in European historicism, furniture of the later years of the period took on a distinct Wilhelminian or Victorian style.

The term Biedermeier is also used to refer to a style of clocks made in Vienna in the early 19th century. The clean and simple lines included a light and airy aesthetic, especially in Viennese regulators of the Laterndluhr and Dachluhr styles.

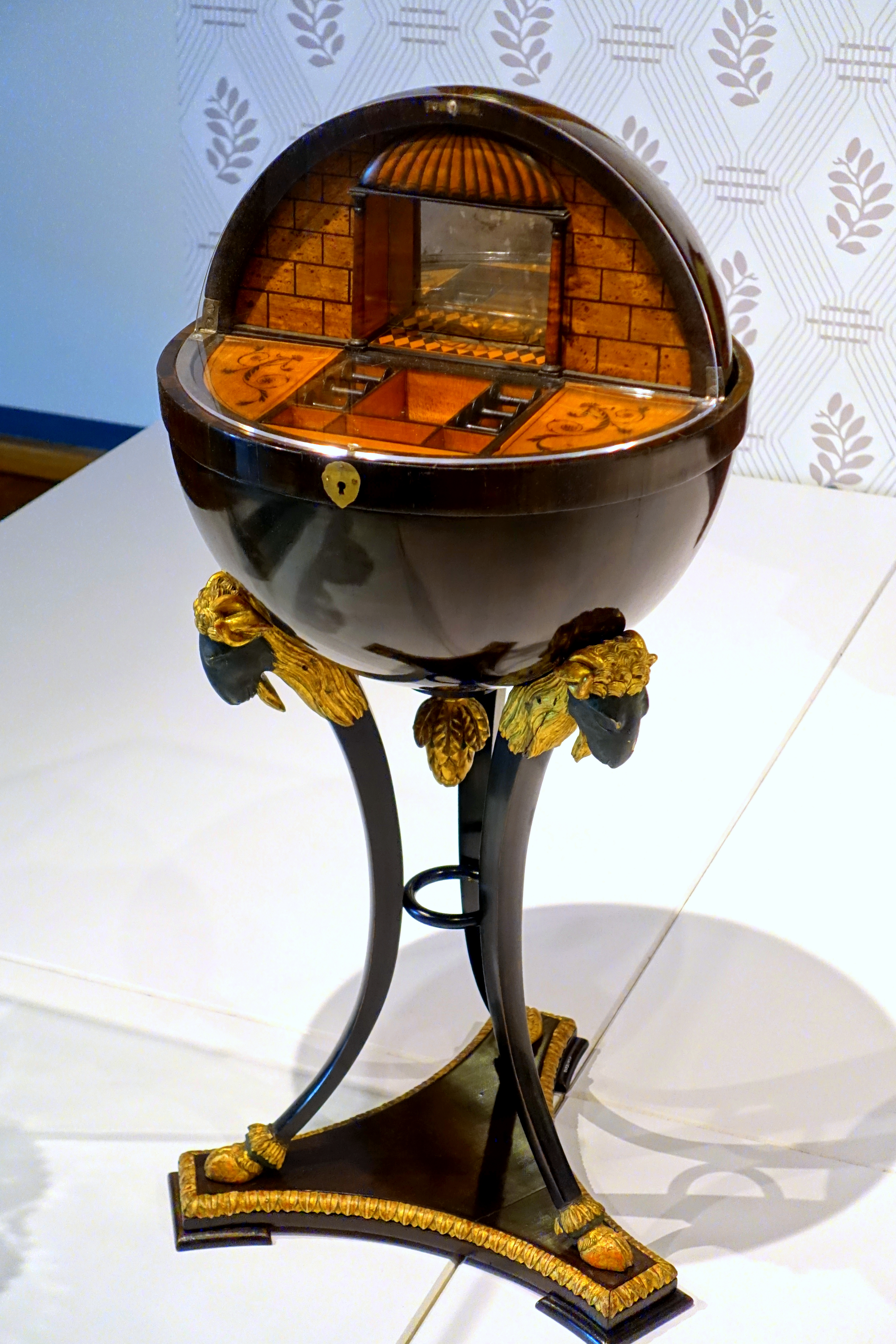
Globe-shaped work table; 1815–1820; maple veneer, bird's eye maple, fruitwoods, gilded and ebonized wood, mirror, brass; from Vienna; Montreal Museum of Fine Arts (Montreal, Canada)

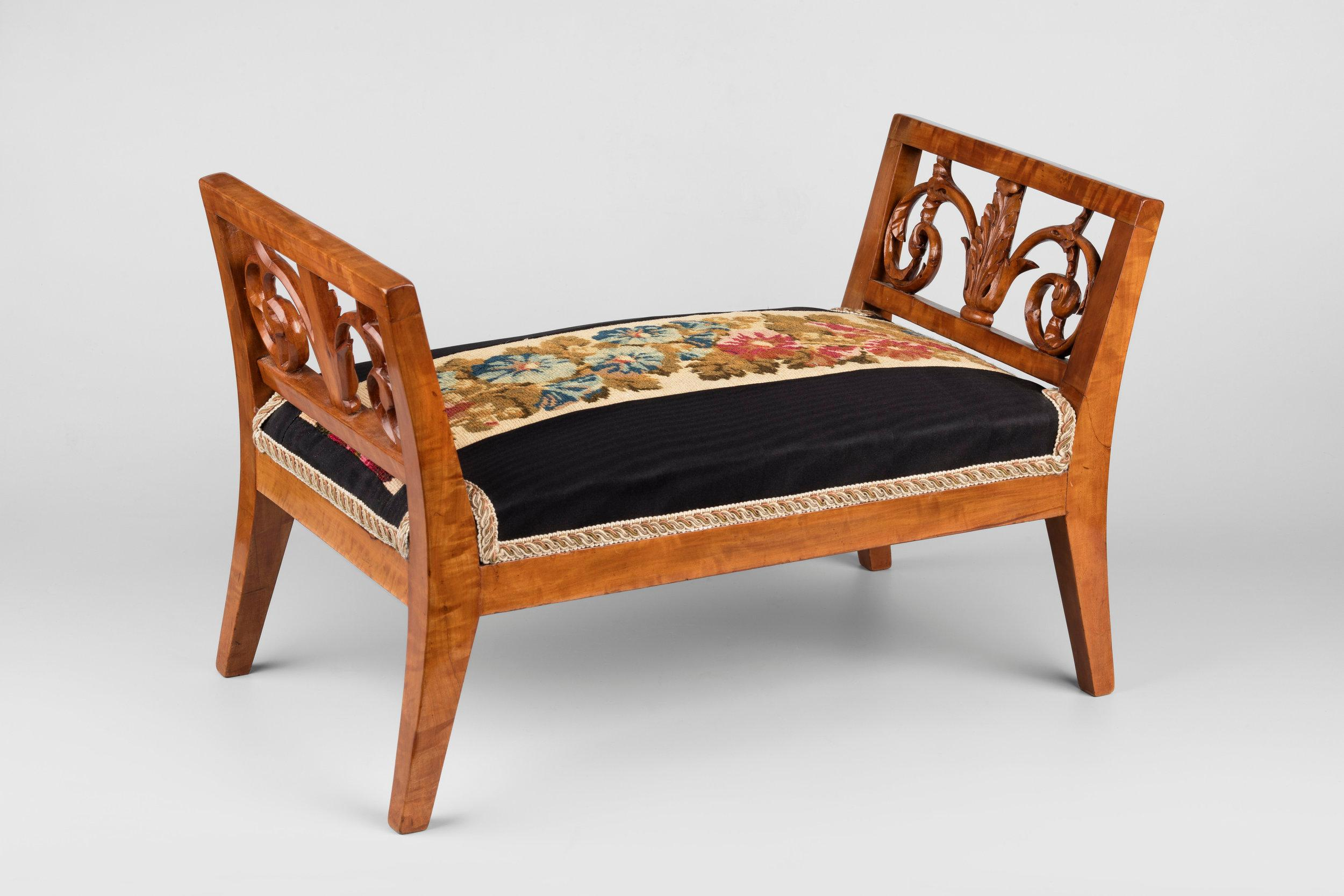
Footstool; 1820–1840; carpentry embroidery upolstery; height: 29 cm, width: 46.3 cm; National Museum of Warsaw (Warsaw, Poland)

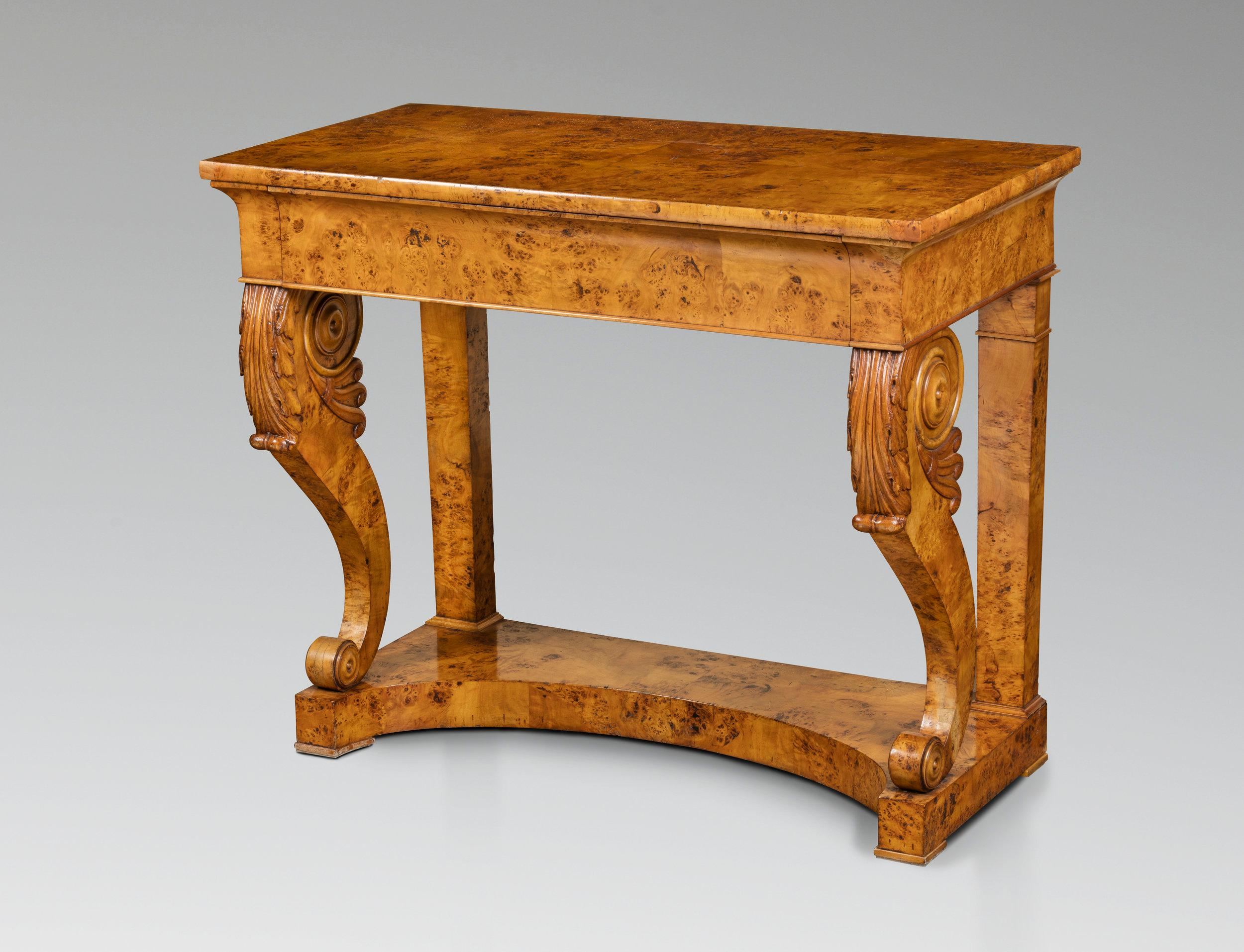
Console; 1825–1830; carpentry wood carving veneering; height: 86.6 cm, width: 104.2 cm; National Museum of Warsaw

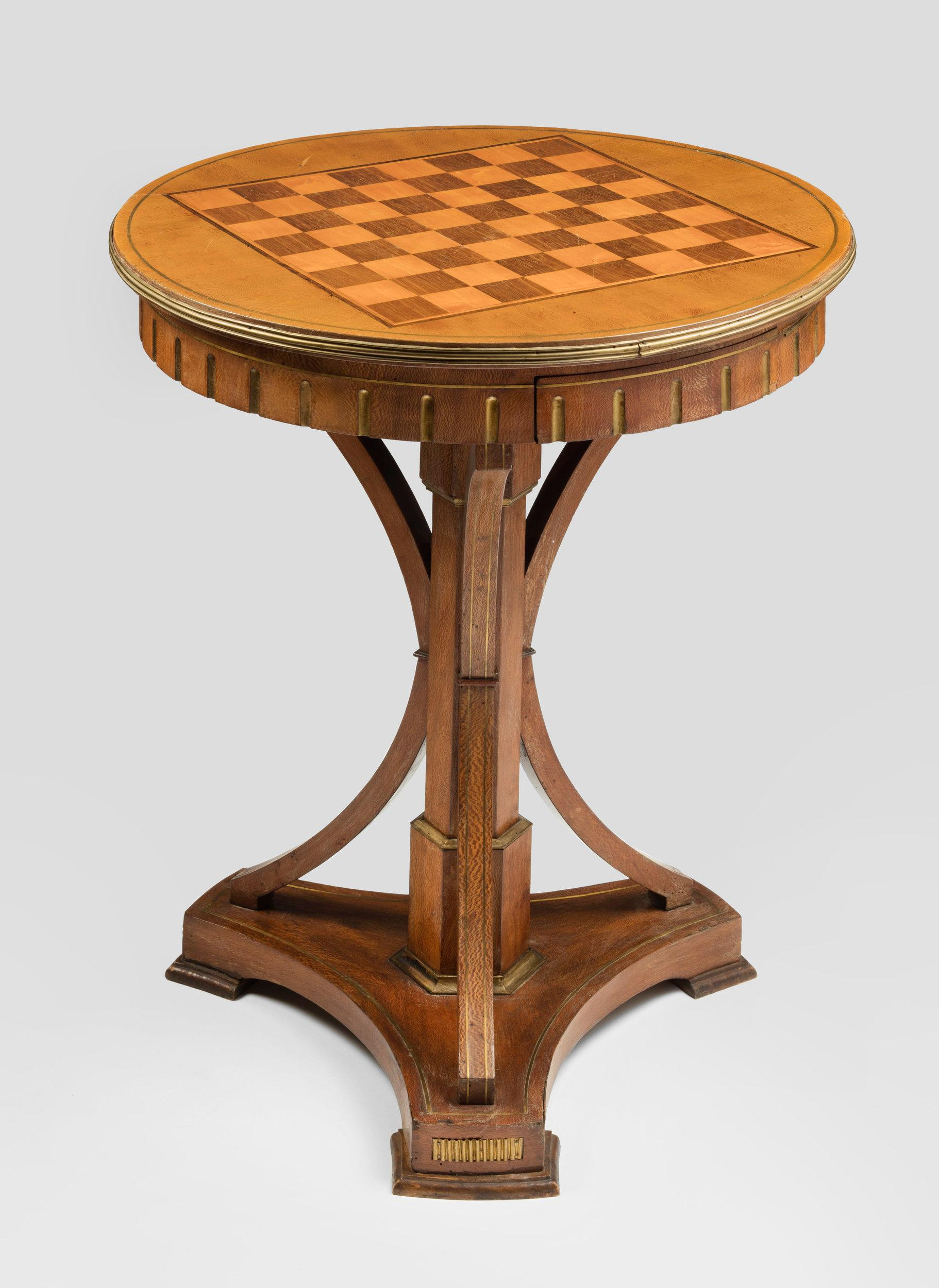
Chess table; 1825–1835; carpentry veneering inlay; height: 77 cm; National Museum of Warsaw

== Architecture ==
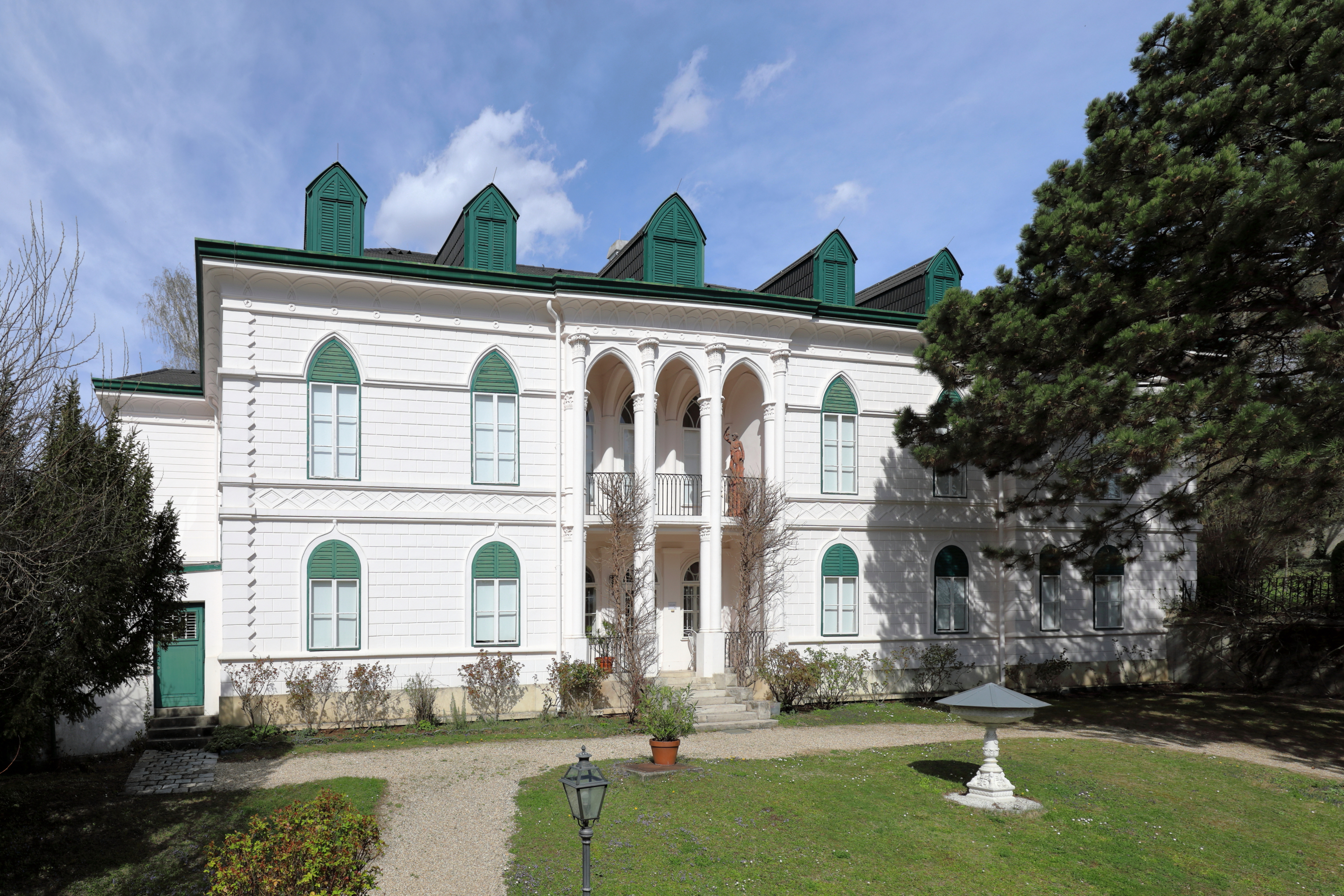
The Geymüllerschlössel in Vienna constructed in 1808, it houses the Biedermeier collection

The 19th century population growth and urbanization in Europe resulted in Biedermeier architecture marked by functionality and elegance.

The Geymüllerschlössel in Vienna was constructed in 1808, it houses today the Biedermeier collection of the Museum of Applied Arts.

=== Architectural legacy ===
In Wilhelmine Germany social reformers regarded Biedermeier architecture as the perfect example for middle class culture and domestic reform.

During the Weimar Republic Germany faced another housing crisis. Paul Schultze-Naumburg was among Germany's most respected neo-Biedermeier architects and in his mind, new housing should imitate the German Biedermeier architecture of around 1800. Paul Mebes popularized the neo-Biedermeier style, which was widely endorsed by German architects. A modernist neo-Biedermeier architectural style was contrived by Adolf Behne, Bruno Taut, and Peter Behrens. Schultz-Naumburg and Heinrich Tessenow advocated for interpreting Biedermeier architecture liberally, allowing for little modernization.

The Polish architectural style Świdermajer was named as a play on Biedermeier.

== Visual arts ==
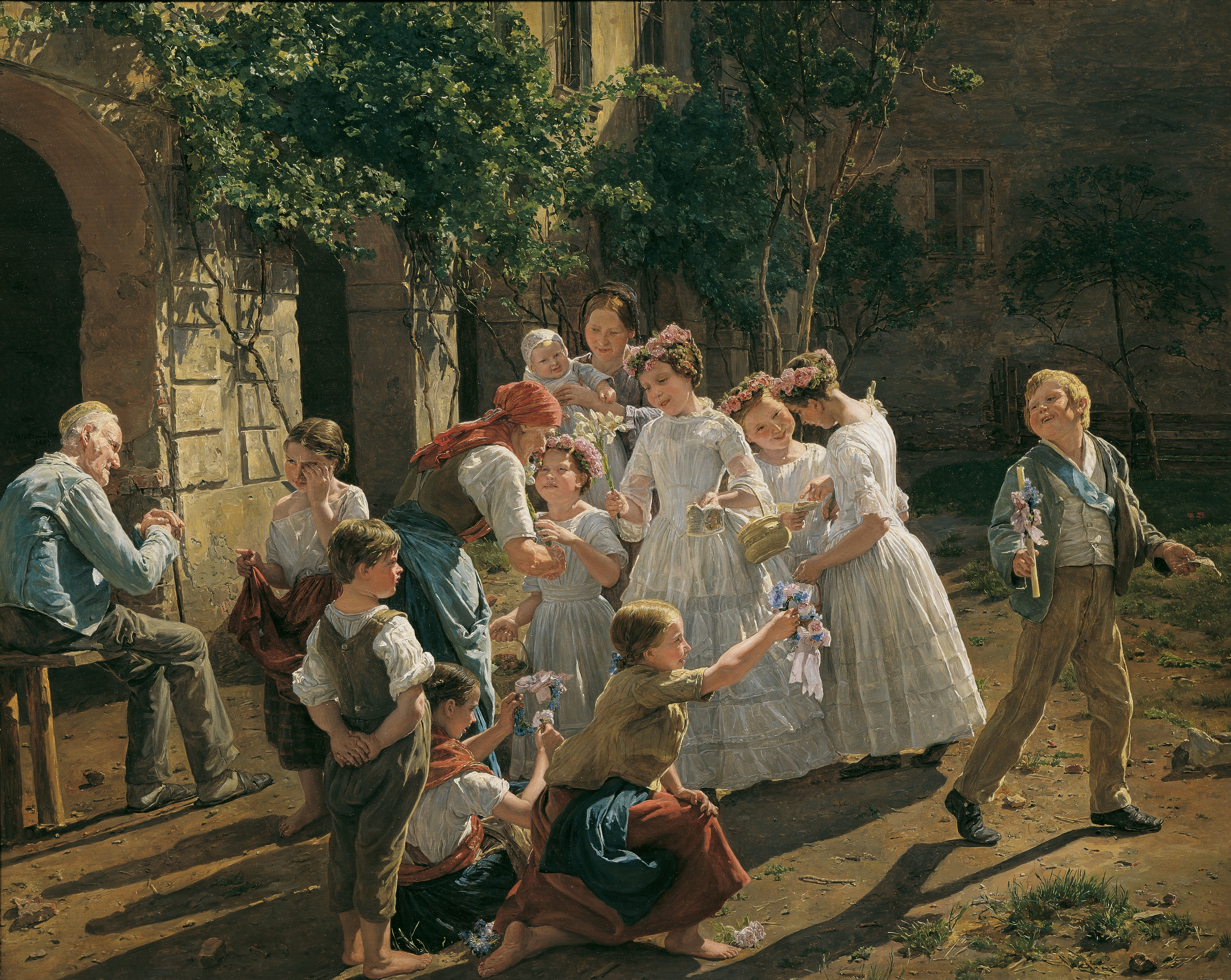
Am Fronleichnamsmorgen, by Ferdinand Georg Waldmüller (1857) is an example of Biedermeier paintings evoking harmony, belief, and tradition.

In the visual arts, Biedermeier style is associated with sentimentality and dullness. Biedermeier paintings are known for their preoccupation with the everyday world with few grand gestures.

This formed an aesthetic as evidenced in the portraits (e.g., Portrait of the Arthaber Family, 1837, by Friedrich von Amerling), landscapes (e.g. see Waldmüller or Gauermann landscapes) and contemporary-reporting genre scenes (e.g., Controversy of the Coachmen, 1828, by Michael Neder). Reflecting the moderately conservative and generally apolitical ethos of the movement and its audience, Biedermeier painting actively shunned the radical commentary used in other circles, though later works like The Bookworm (c. 1850) left space for some lighthearted satire.

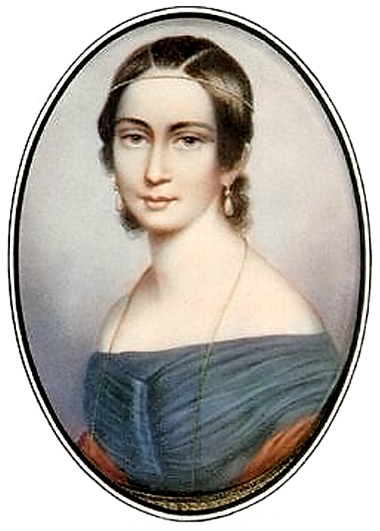
Clara Schumann, noted pianist, portrayed in 1838 by Andreas Staub

Key painters of the Biedermeier movement were Carl Spitzweg (1808–1885), Ferdinand Georg Waldmüller (1795–1865), Henrik Weber (1818–1866), Josip Tominc (1780–1866), Friedrich von Amerling (1803–1887), Friedrich Gauermann (1807–1862), Johann Baptist Reiter (1813–1890), Peter Fendi (1796–1842), Michael Neder (1807–1882), Josef Danhauser (1805–1845), and Edmund Wodick (1806–1886) among others.

The biggest collection of Viennese Biedermeier paintings in the world is currently hosted by the Belvedere Palace Museum in Vienna.

== Music ==
Biedermeier music was most evident in the numerous publications for in-home music making. Published arrangements of operatic excerpts, German Lieder, and some symphonic works that could be performed at the piano without professional musical training, illustrated the broadened reach of music in this period. Composers from this period include Beethoven, Schubert, Rossini, Weber, Mendelssohn, Chopin, Schumann and Liszt.

The so called Schubertiad were people who gathered around the composer Franz Schubert to provide a forum or meeting place for political secret societies. However, Biedermeier home music making was decidedly unpretentious and nonpolitical, the backdrop being politically explosive. Even the critical discussion of music itself was avoided.

== Czech National Revival ==
The Biedermeier period coincided with the Czech National Revival movement in the Czech-speaking areas. The most famous writers of the period were Božena Němcová, Karel Hynek Mácha, František Ladislav Čelakovský, Václav Kliment Klicpera, and Josef Kajetán Tyl. Key painters of the Czech Biedermeier were Josef Navrátil, Antonín Machek, and Antonín Mánes. Landscapes, still lifes, courtyards, family scenes, and portraits were very popular. Václav Tomášek composed lyric piano pieces and songs to the patriotic lyrics of Czech authors. Biedermeier was also reflected in the applied arts: glass and porcelain, fashion, jewellery, and furniture.
