= Emmy von Egidy =

German sculptor (1872–1946)

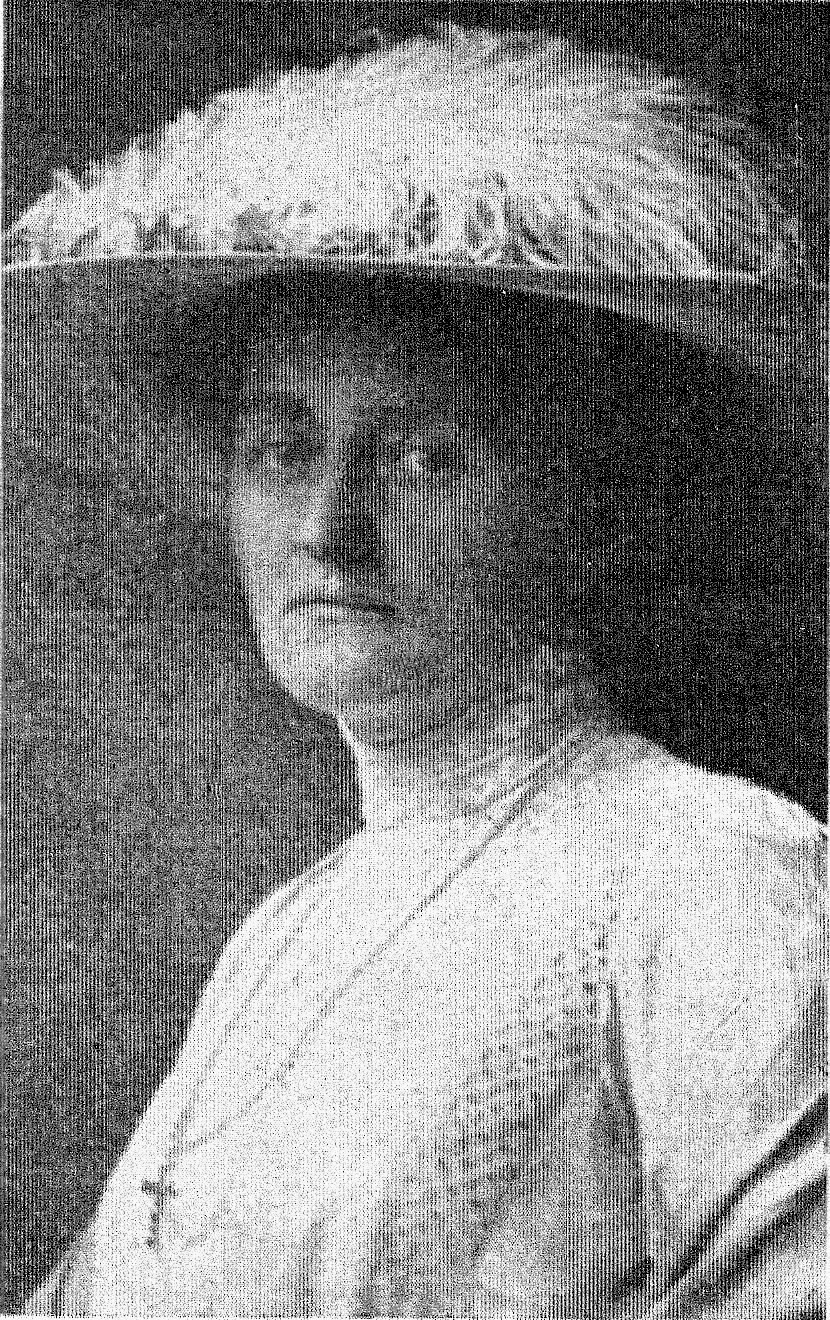
Emmy von Egidy

Emmy von Egidy (full name Luise Charlotte Alexandrine Emma von Egidy; born 5 April 1872 – 1 December 1946) was a German sculptor and writer.

== Life ==
Von Egidy was born on 5 April 1872 in Pirna. She was the daughter of the social ethicist Moritz von Egidy and his wife Luise, née von Götz. In the early days of modern arts and crafts, she worked for the United Workshops for Arts and Crafts in Munich. In 1904, she presented works of art at the Dresden art exhibition. She also wrote novels on women's issues and marriage problems, which appeared in several editions.

Von Egidy was a friend of Clara Westhoff. When Rainer Maria Rilke was in Basel in 1919, he was introduced to Basel society by Egidy.

Von Egidy died on 1 December 1946 in Weimar at the age of 74.

== Works (selection) ==
=== Prose ===
- Marie-Elisa. Novel. Pierson Verlag, Dresden 1898, OCLC 985129952.
- Mensch unter Menschen. Novel. Pierson Verlag, Dresden 1900, OCLC 68163196.
- Ilse Bleiders. Novel. S. Fischer Verlag, Berlin 1902, OCLC 68163188.
- Erschwiegen. Novel. Pierson Verlag, Dresden 1903, OCLC 247870527.
- Liebe, die enden konnte. Novel. S. Fischer Verlag, Berlin 1907, OCLC 603825715.
- Im Moderschlößchen. Novel. S. Fischer Verlag, Berlin 1909, OCLC 246757787.
- Die Prinzessin vom Monde. Two novellas. S. Fischer Verlag, Berlin 1911, OCLC 250516493.
- Mathias Werner. Novel. S., Fischer Verlag, Berlin 1913, DNB-IDN 579328481.

=== Sachbuch ===
- Christoph Moritz von Egidy. Becoming, being and working. Dedicated to the grandchildren on the 90th birthday of their grandfather. Self-published, Weimar 1935–1936, OCLC 312493485.

== Exhibitions ==
- Eva's Daughters. Munich women writers and the modern women's movement. 1894–1933. Exhibition at the Monacensia in the Hildebrandhaus from 14 March to 16 September 2018, curated by Ingvild Richardsen (Emmy von Egidy was one of the protagonists of the exhibition)
- Die modernen Frauen des Atelier Elvira in München und Augsburg 1887–1908, Kunstsammlungen Augsburg, Grafisches Kabinett, 25 June to 25 September 2022, curated by Ingvild Richardsen (Emmy von Egidy was part of the exhibition)
- Emmy von Egidy (1872–1946), Keramik-Museum Bürgel, 19 November 2022 to 23 April 2023
