= Bernhard Goldenberg =

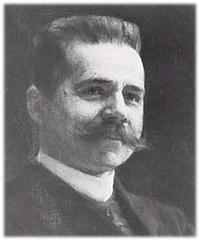

Bernhard Goldenberg (20 March 1872 in Dahlerau – 30 May 1917 in Essen) was a German engineer.

== Life ==
Goldenberg was the son of Friedrich Goldenberg, the head of the dye works at the Wülfing works and son. Later he also did a practical training in mechanical engineering at the Wülfing works. After his mandatory military service, Goldenberg studied mechanical and electrical engineering at the technical universities in Hannover, Stuttgart and Berlin before becoming a technical advisor to Hugo Stinnes in 1899. In 1903, after a study trip that had primarily taken him to the General Electric and Edison Electric Light Corporation plants in the US, he became Technical Director of Rheinisch-Westfälisches Elektrizitätswerk AG, and in this capacity was responsible for the technical implementation of the rapid expansion of electrification in the Rhineland and Ruhr area. In this capacity, the power plants in Essen (1903), Reisholz (1909), Wesel (1912) and the promontory headquarters in Knapsack (April 1914), later named after Goldenberg, were built in rapid succession.

After his death in 1917, after a five-day hospital stay and battle with pneumonia, RWE named the Goldenberg-Werk lignite-fired power plant in Knapsack near Cologne after him at Stinnes' suggestion.
