= Paul Mebes =

German architect (1872–1938)

Paul Louis Adolf Mebes
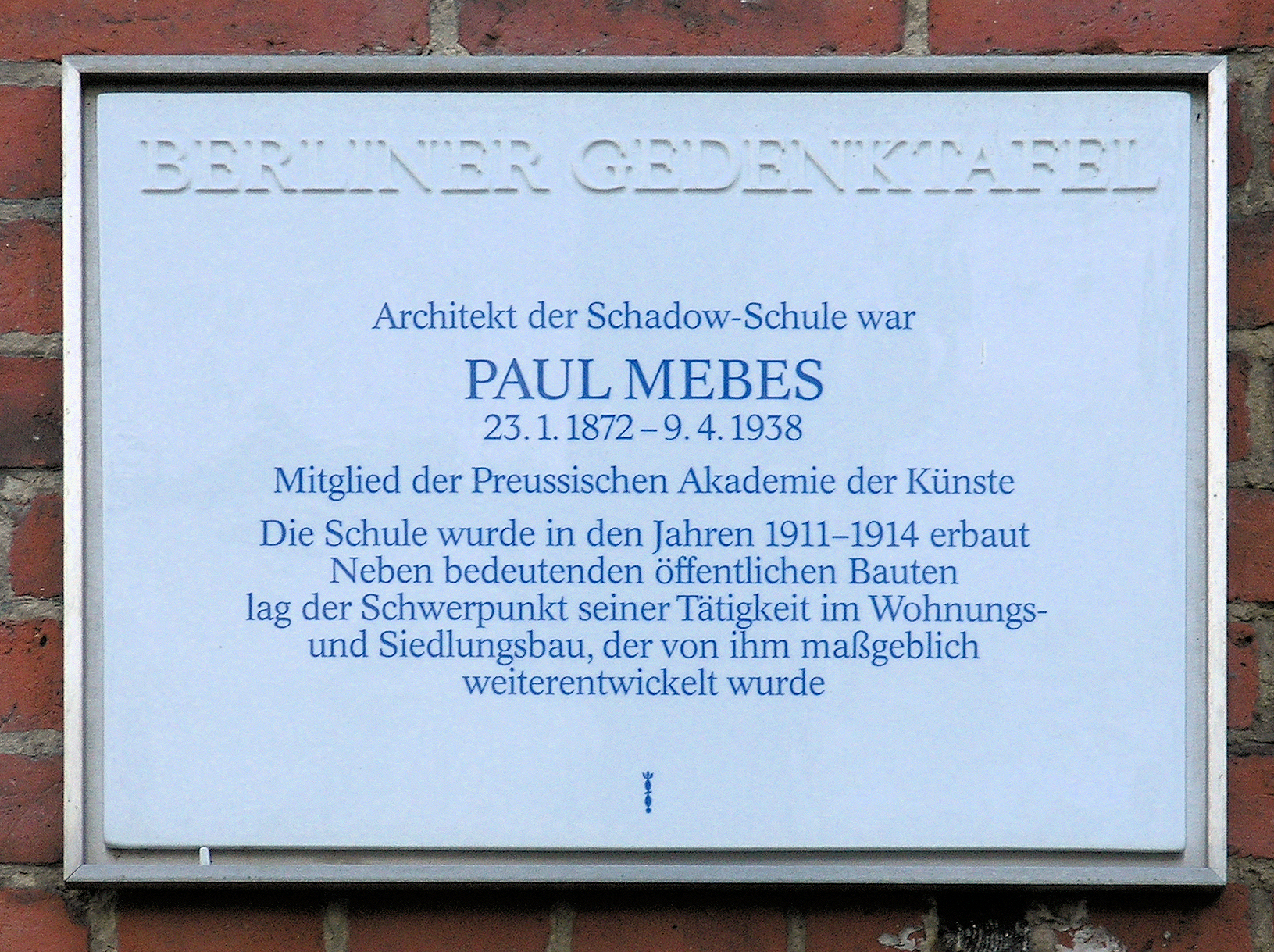
- Memorial plaque
- Born: 23 January 1872; Magdeburg, Germany
- Died: 9 April 1938 (aged 66); Berlin, Germany
- Occupation: Architect
- Known for: Apartment housing estates

Paul Louis Adolf Mebes (23 January 1872 – 9 April 1938) was a German architect, architectural theorist and university professor.

== Life ==
Paul Mebes was born on 23 January 1872 in Magdeburg. He completed practical training as a carpenter and then studied at the Technische Hochschulen in Braunschweig and Charlottenburg. After graduating he worked as a government architect (assessor) in the public works department.

By 1906 (according to some sources as early as 1902) Mebes was working for the Berlin Civil Servants Dwelling Association. From 1909 to 1919, he served as a part-time member of its technical board. From 1911, he and Paul Emmerich ran the architectural firm of "Mebes and Emmerich", which was devoted mainly to the Dwelling Association's buildings. The firm also created designs for other buildings, including schools and administrative buildings. On 19 November 1920 he was awarded an honorary doctorate by the Technische Hochschulen Braunschweig. In 1931 Mebes became a member of the Prussian Academy of Arts. He resigned this membership on 15 May 1933.

Mebes died on 9 April 1938 in Berlin. His memorial grave is located in the Städtischer Friedhof Berlin-Zehlendorf. The "Paul Mebes Park" on Potsdamer Strasse at the corner of Fischer-Dieskau-way in Zehlendorf, Berlin was named in his honor.

== Style ==
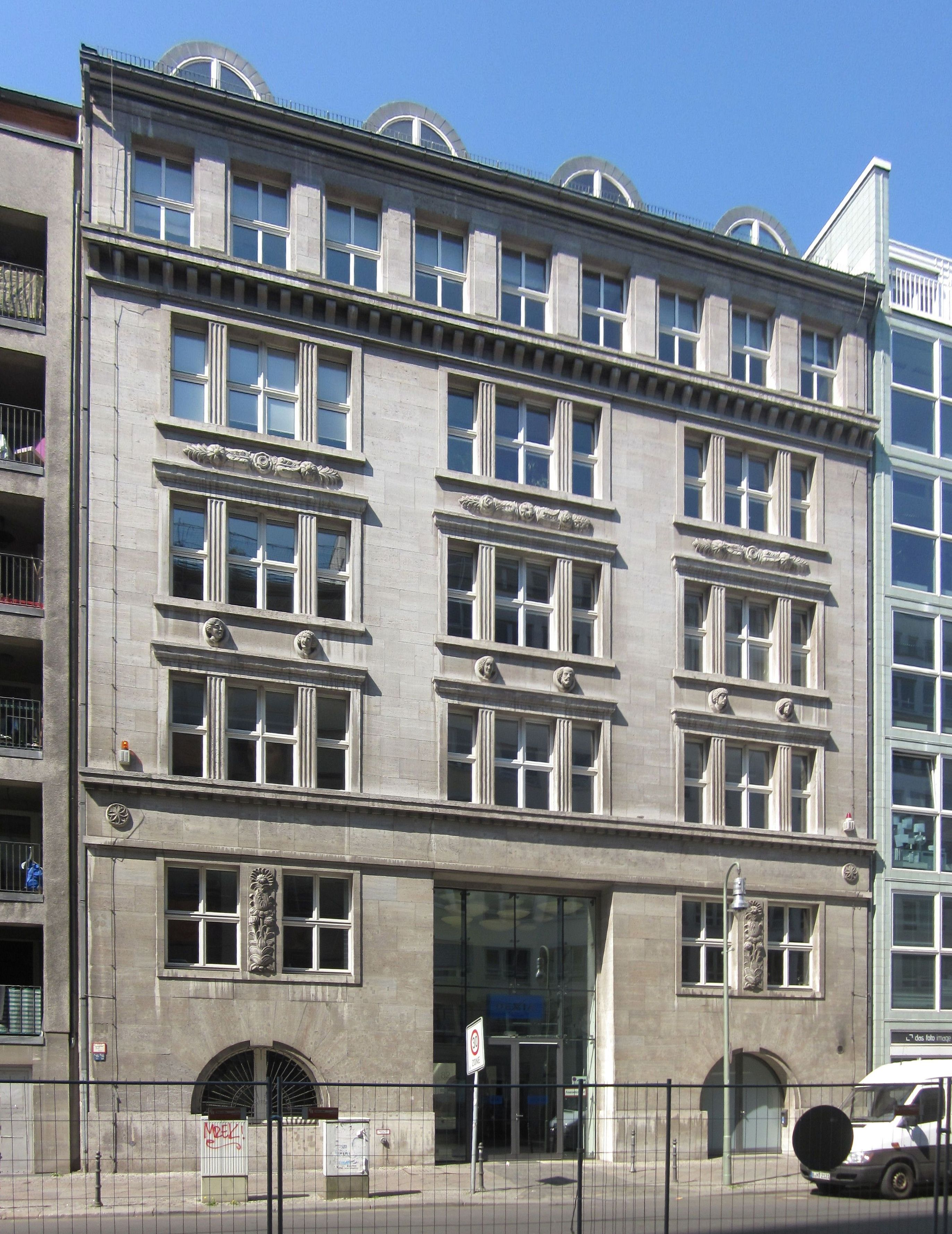
Former commerce building of the Iduna insurance company at Charlottenstraße No. 82 in Berlin-Kreuzberg. It was built in 1913 to a design by Paul Mebes. The building has been designated as a cultural heritage monument.

Mebes' designs were innovative and won him recognition in Europe. He was one of the pioneers of housing estates before the First World War. His apartment building designs for the Berlin Civil Servants Dwelling Association and the Kroch village in Leipzig were particularly notable.

The activity of Mebes can be divided into three periods: the early phase (1909–1918), an expressive phase (1918–1924) and the substantive phase that continued until his death (1925–1938). The early phase was characterized by work within the traditional architecture of Berlin's early days, with elaborate stucco facades and indiscriminate eclecticism. Here, Mebes worked entirely within existing styles: particularly often using classical details, but various forms of North German or Baroque Dutch details, and even early Gothic forms, occur.

In the expressive phase, residential buildings were created with expressive, but sparingly used elements, such as contrasting colors of alternating brick and plaster, jagged protruding stairways and pointed windows. From the second half of the 1920s he created buildings in a classical modernism style. Mebes was less concerned about the details than before, but still designed aesthetically coherent works. He continued to emphasize color effects. He made carefully considered floor plans, with bright and well ventilated apartments.

== Buildings ==
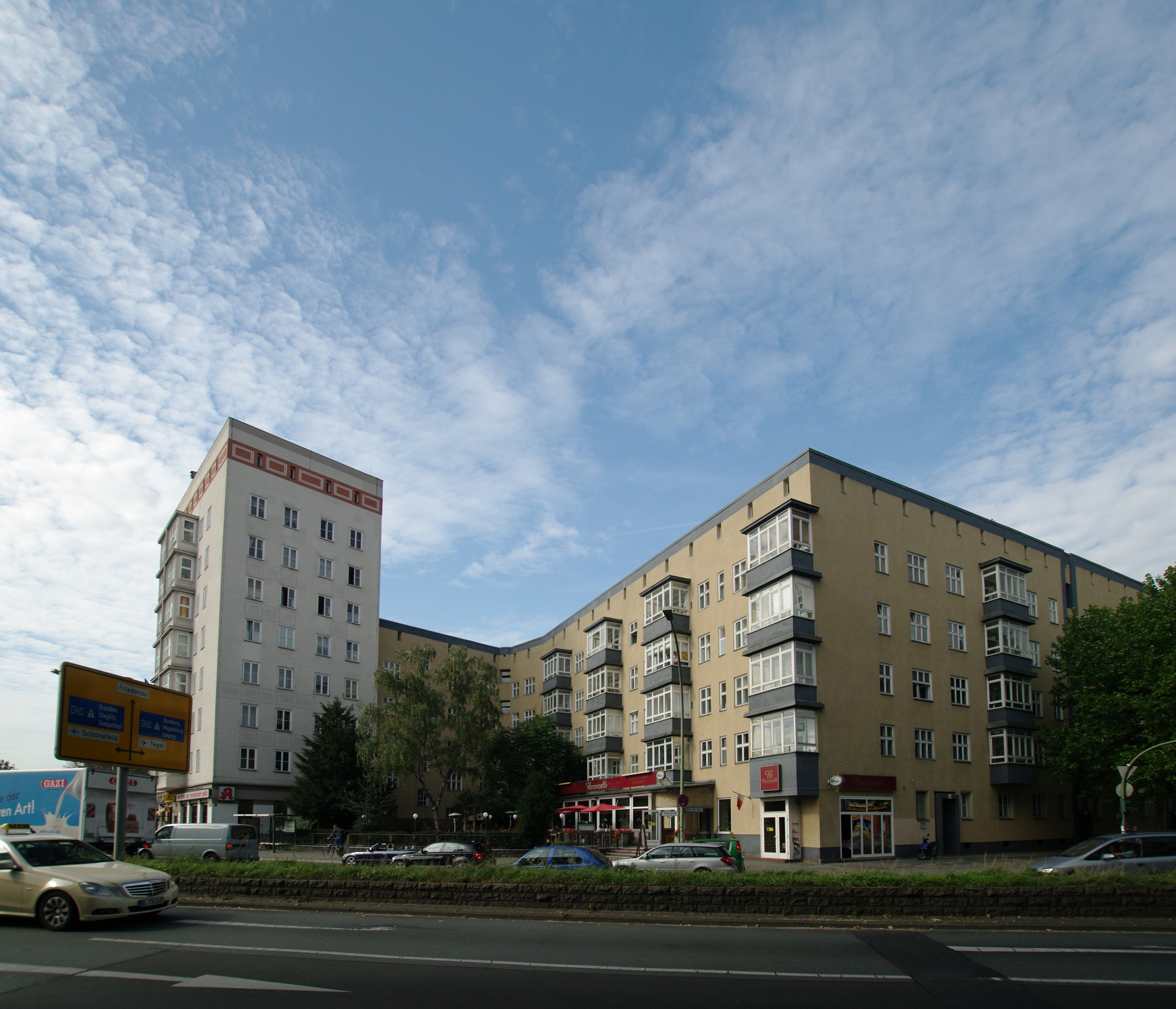
Building ensemble Innsbrucker Platz 4/Martin Luther Straße 126, 1922–28 by Mebes und Emmerich

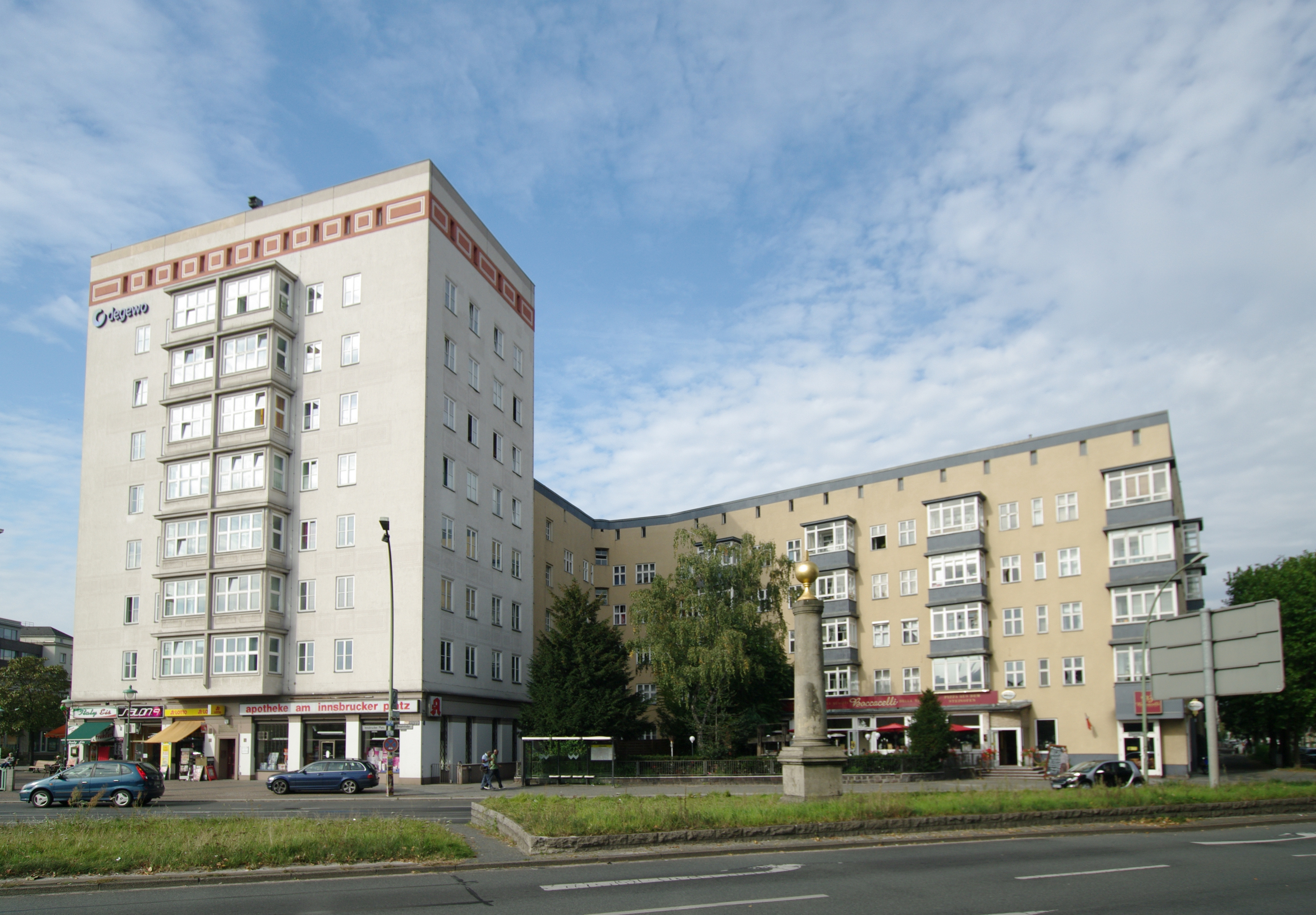
Building ensemble Innsbrucker Platz 4/Martin Luther Straße 126, 1922–28 by Mebes und Emmerich

- 1906–1907: housing development at Planufer in Berlin-Kreuzberg
- 1906–1907: Residential Development in Berlin-Schöneberg, just north of the Rudolph Wilde Square (now John F. Kennedy Platz )
- 1907–1908: Condominium Steglitz II Fritschweg / Grillparzerstraße / Rückertstraße, officials Dwellings Association, Berlin
- 1907–1910: Condominium Charlottenburg IIa and b, Horstweg / Danckelmannstraße / Wundtstraße / Vereinsweg, officials Dwellings Association, Berlin
- 1908–1909: Residential Development in Berlin Niederschönhausen, Grabbeallee / Paul Franke Road, officials Dwellings Association, Berlin
- 1909–1910: houses for the housing association officials in Berlin-Zehlendorf, Clayallee 289–303
- 1909-1914/1921-1923: development "Reichshof" (now the "family farm") for the apartment association officials to Bochum in Bochum Grumme: 210 residential units in four stages along the streets Herder avenue Wielandstraße, family farm and at the family farm
- 1910–1912: Garden City Zehlendorf in Berlin-Zehlendorf, 1st Phase: elf house groups along the Camphausen, Dallwitz, Berlepsch and Thürstraße, and in Stieg Rother
- 1912: Villa Fahrenholtz, Jean-Burger-Straße 2 in Magdeburg district Leipziger Straße
- 1913–1929: so-called " brass housing settlement "with water tower in Finow
- 1914: Schadow Gymnasium in Berlin-Zehlendorf
- 1918–1922: Condominium "Rechener Busch" in Bochum Wiemelhausen, Else-deer-road 13–21, 18–20, 32–40, Ottilie Schoenewald-road 16–24, 21–27, Dr. David Moritz -Straße 1–3
- 1919–1921: Garden City Zehlendorf 2nd, Phase: eleven groups along the house-door, and Dallwitz Radtkestraße
- 1921–1923: Garden City Zehlendorf 3rd, Phase: 108 apartments between Schrock, Berlepsch and Camp Street house
- 1921–1927: Housing in Bochum Wiemelhausen, Grolmannstraße 4–14, 11–17, Kampmann street 4–22, 17–23, 1–13 Mulderpaßstraße, Brinkmann Straße 5–9, Friedrich-Strasse 21 Harkort
- 1923: Semi-detached house in Bochum Wiemelhausen, Ostermann Straße 5–7
- 1923–1925: development "On Heidehof" in Berlin-Schlachtensee
- 1924–1926: Residential Building "Werra block" in Berlin-Neukölln
- 1925–1930: Residential Development in Berlin-Pankow
- 1926: houses in Bochum-Hamme, Overdycker 8–10
- 1926–1927: Housing Development Lincoln, Zachert, Bietzke, Eggersdorfer and Einbecker street in Berlin-Friedrichsfelde
- 1926–1927: houses in Bochum Wiemelhausen, Königsallee 160–164, 36 units
- 1926–1929: Housing in Bochum Grumme, Heckertstraße 108–110, Starenweg 7–9
- 1926–1929: Housing in Bochum Wiemelhausen, Danziger Strasse 1–11, 2–14, Thorner Road 20–28, Druze mountain road 138, 130 apartments
- 1927: Group of houses in the village bear, Bochum-Weitmar, Graff ring 39–49
- 1927–1928: residential development in central Berlin, Oslo Road 94–98
- 1926–1928: residential development of the SPD in Berlin-Schöneberg, Rubens / Otzen / Traeger / Eisackstraße
- 1928–1930: Mountain School in Apolda
- 1929–1930: Housing in Bochum Grumme, Alexandrinenstraße 6–24, 18–25 Teylestraße
- 1930–1932: residential development, called " Kroch settlement ", in Gohlis (Leipzig)
- 1930–1934: "fire-and smoke-free settlement" in Berlin-Steglitz, Steglitz dam
- 1932–1934: residential development, so-called "Flußpferdhof" in Berlin-Alt-Hohenschoenhausen, Große-Leege Road 60–82
- 1934–1935: Administration Building Feuersozietät the Province of Brandenburg in Berlin-Tiergarten, at Carlsbad

== Gallery ==
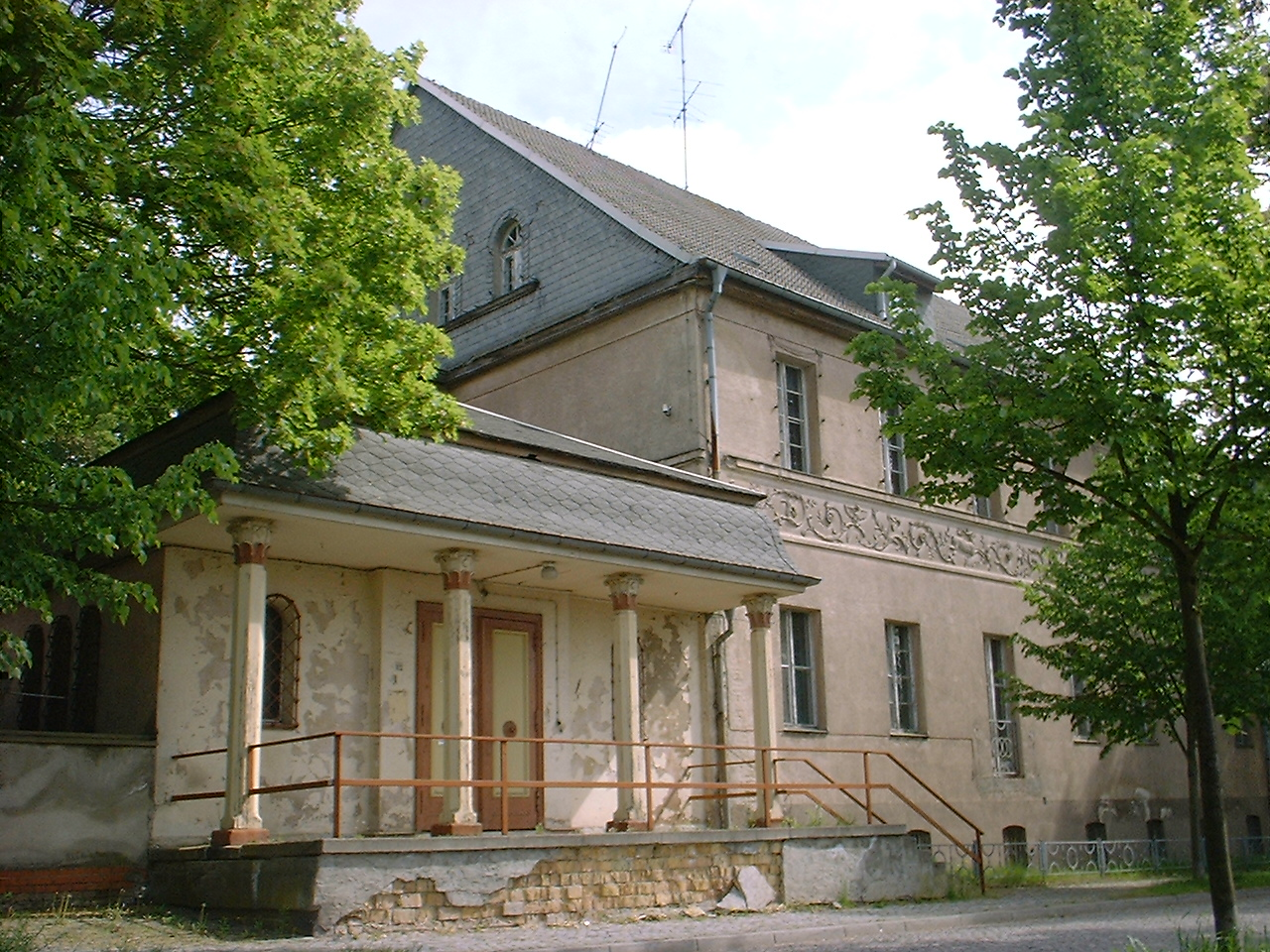
Villa Hirsch (Erich-Steinfurth-Str. 12) in the Messingwerksiedlung in Eberswalde, Germany

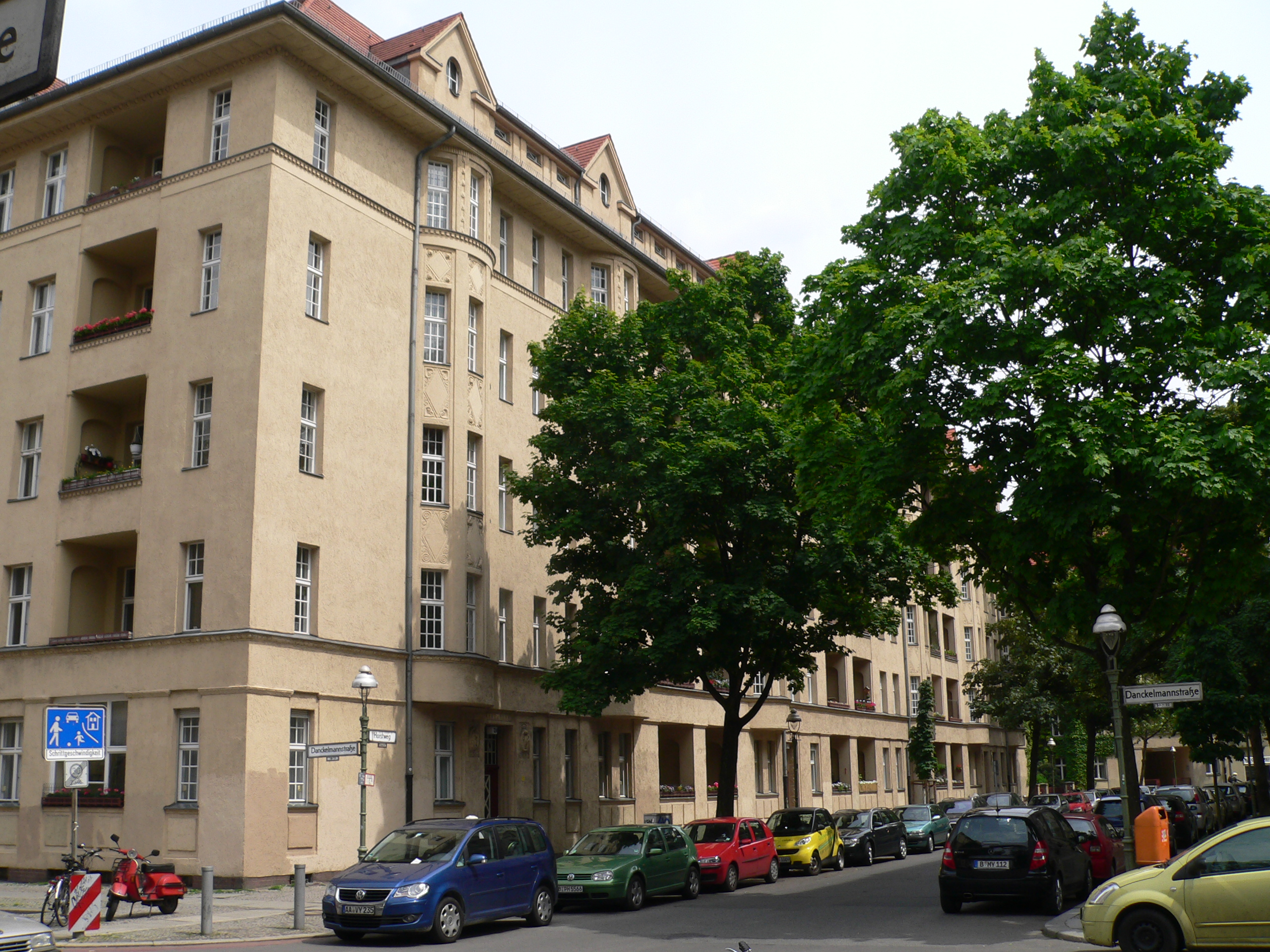
Berlin-Charlottenburg Horstweg (architect: Paul Mebes for Beamten-Wohnungs-Verein zu Berlin)

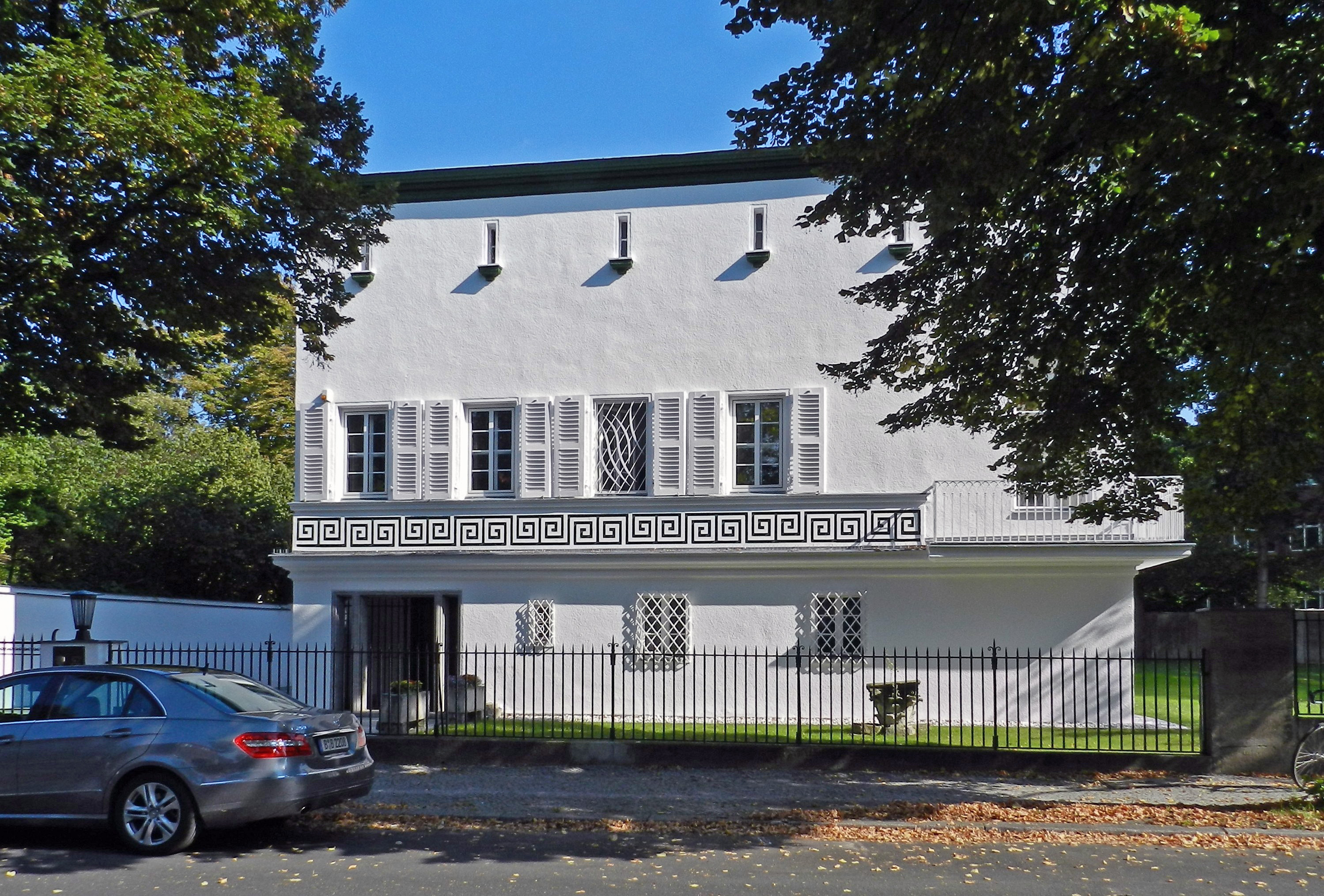
Landhaus, Binger Straße 51/52, Berlin-Wilmersorf. Bauzeit: 1924–25, Architekten: Pauk Mebes, Paul Emmerich, Bauherr: Geheimrat Hans Riese.

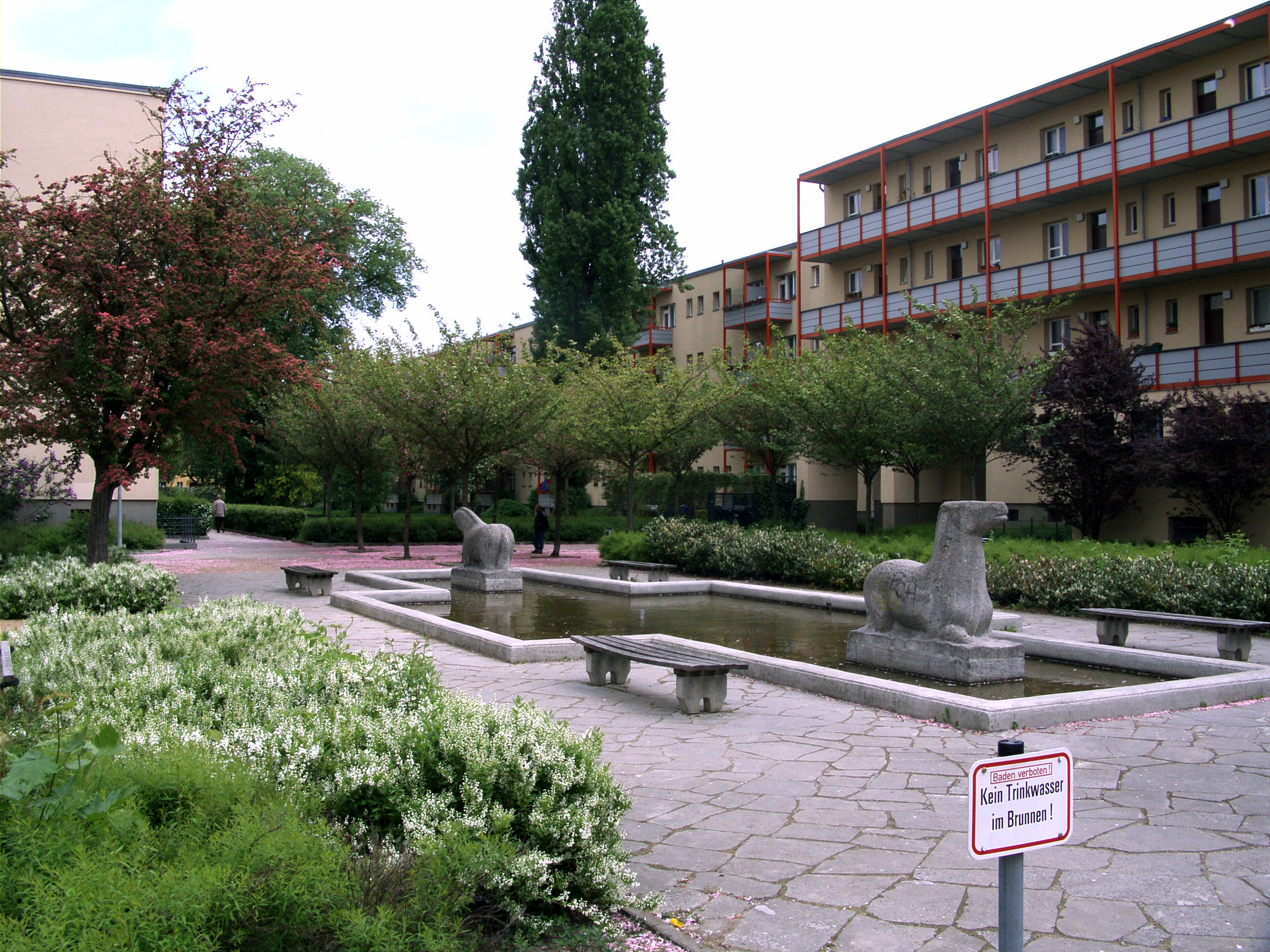
Siedlung Flusspferdhof, Märkisches Viertel in Berlin-Alt-Hohenschönhausen

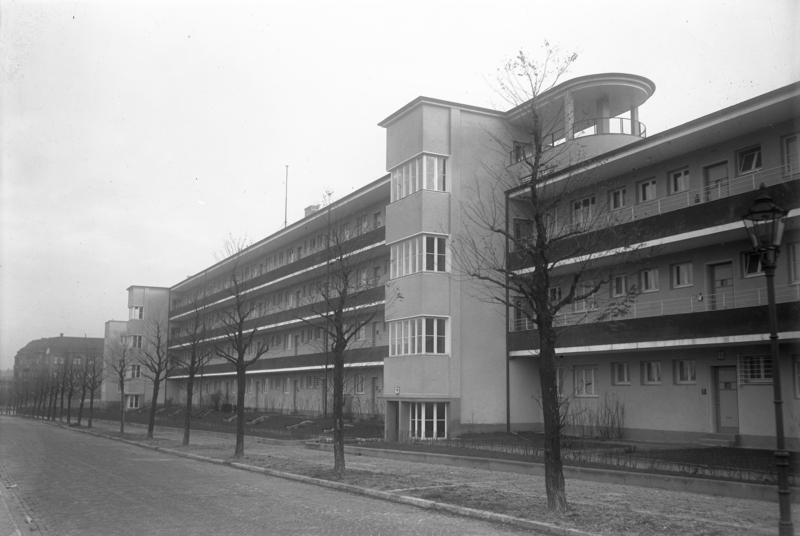
The first gallery building in Berlin-Steglitz!

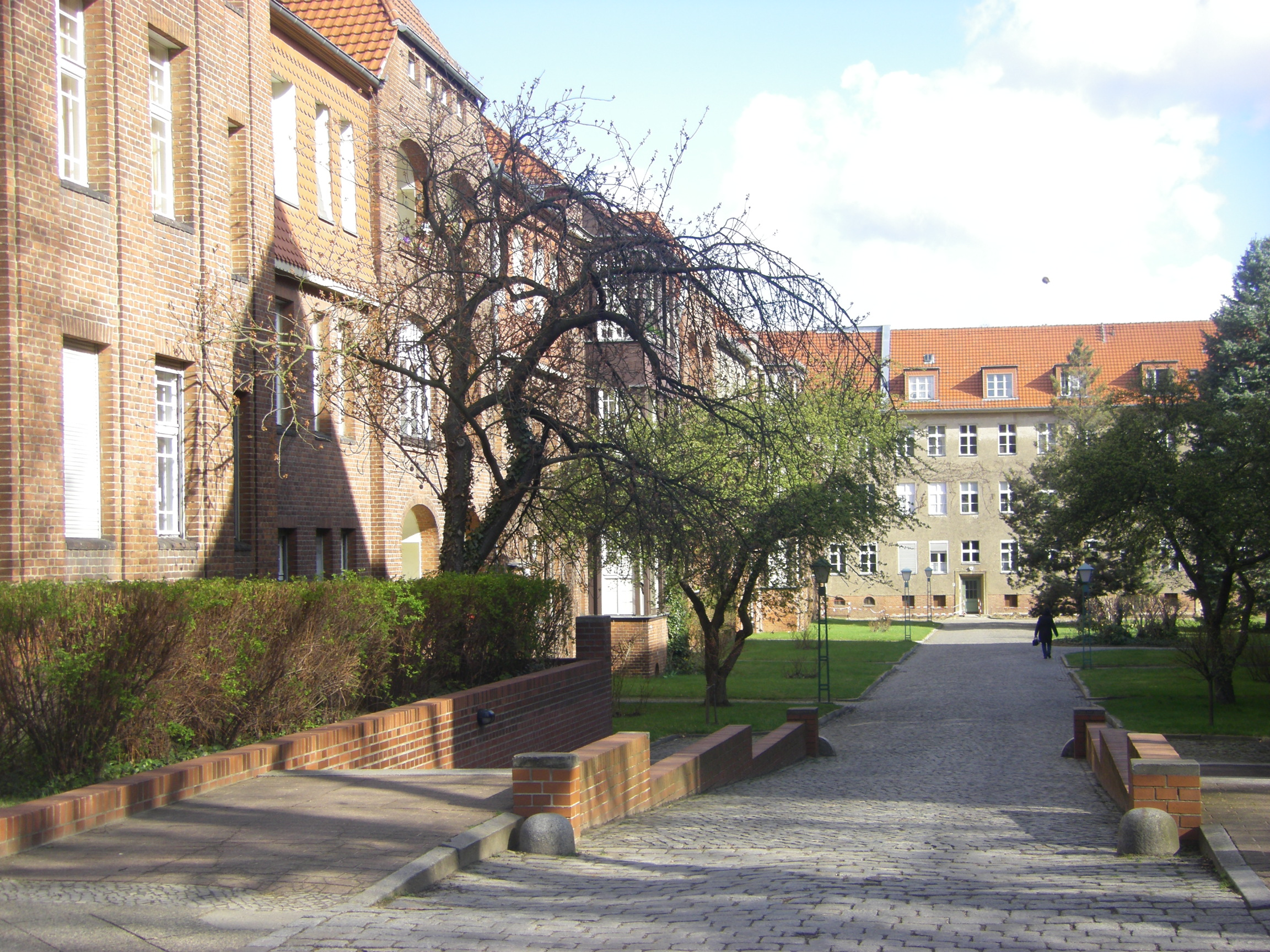
Berlin-Steglitz Fritschweg (Architekt: Paul Mebes für Beamten-Wohnungs-Verein zu Berlin)

== Bibliography ==
- Paul Mebes (Hrsg.): Um 1800. (2 Bände) 1908.
- Paul Mebes (Hrsg.), Walter Curt Behrendt (Bearb.): Um 1800. Architektur und Handwerk im letzten Jahrhundert ihrer traditionellen Entwicklung. F. Bruckmann, München 1918. (als 2. Auflage bezeichnet)

== Notes and references ==
Citations

Further reading

- Edina Meyer: Paul Mebes. Miethausbau in Berlin 1906–1938. Verlag Richard Seitz & Co., Berlin 1972. (mit umfassendem Werkverzeichnis)
- Thomas Bahr: Paul Mebes. Architekt der Apoldaer Bergschule. In: Apoldaer Heimat, Band 18 (2000), S. 7–10.
- José-Manuel García Roig: Tres arquitectos del período guillermino: Hermann Muthesius – Paul Schultze-Naumburg – Paul Mebes. Universidad de Valladolid, Secretariado de Publicaciones, Valladolid (Spain) 2006.

External links

- Literature by and about Paul Mebes in the German National Library catalogue
- Website über den von Mebes gebauten expressionistischen Wasserturm in Finow
- Ausführliche Biografie von Paul Mebes durch das Bezirksamt Steglitz-Zehlendorf (PDF-Datei; 53 kB)
- Bauten von Paul Mebes in Bochum auf www.ruhr-bauten.de
