= 1969 in the United States =

- Decades: 1940s; 1950s; 1960s; 1970s; 1980s
- See also: History of the United States (1964–1980); Timeline of United States history (1950–1969); List of years in the United States

Events from the year 1969 in the United States.

== Incumbents ==
=== Federal government ===
- President:

Lyndon B. Johnson (D-Texas) (until January 20)
Richard Nixon (R-New York, then R-California) (starting January 20)

- Vice President:

Hubert Humphrey (D-Minnesota) (until January 20)
Spiro Agnew (R-Maryland) (starting January 20)

- Chief Justice:

Earl Warren (California) (until June 23)
Warren E. Burger (Virginia) (starting June 23)

- Speaker of the House of Representatives: John William McCormack (D-Massachusetts)
- Senate Majority Leader: Mike Mansfield (D-Montana)
- Congress: 90th (until January 3), 91st (starting January 3)

==== State governments ====
Governors and lieutenant governors

=== Governors ===
- Governor of Alabama: Albert Brewer (Democratic)
- Governor of Alaska: Wally Hickel (Republican) (until January 29), Keith Harvey Miller (Republican) (starting January 29)
- Governor of Arizona: Jack Richard Williams (Republican)
- Governor of Arkansas: Winthrop Rockefeller (Republican)
- Governor of California: Ronald Reagan (Republican)
- Governor of Colorado: John Arthur Love (Republican)
- Governor of Connecticut: John N. Dempsey (Democratic)
- Governor of Delaware: Charles L. Terry Jr. (Democratic) (until January 21), Russell W. Peterson (Republican) (starting January 21)
- Governor of Florida: Claude R. Kirk Jr. (Republican)
- Governor of Georgia: Lester Maddox (Democratic)
- Governor of Hawaii: John A. Burns (Democratic)
- Governor of Idaho: Don Samuelson (Republican)
- Governor of Illinois: Samuel H. Shapiro (Democratic) (until January 13), Richard B. Ogilvie (Republican) (starting January 13)
- Governor of Indiana: Roger D. Branigin (Democratic) (until January 13), Edgar Whitcomb (Republican) (starting January 13)
- Governor of Iowa:
  - until January 1: Harold E. Hughes (Democratic)
  - January 1-16: Robert D. Fulton (Democratic)
  - starting January 16: Robert D. Ray (Republican)
- Governor of Kansas: Robert Docking (Democratic)
- Governor of Kentucky: Louie B. Nunn (Republican)
- Governor of Louisiana: John J. McKeithen (Democratic)
- Governor of Maine: Kenneth M. Curtis (Democratic)
- Governor of Maryland: Spiro Agnew (Republican) (until January 7), Marvin Mandel (Democratic) (starting January 7)
- Governor of Massachusetts: John A. Volpe (Republican) (until January 22), Francis W. Sargent (Republican) (starting January 22)
- Governor of Michigan: George W. Romney (Republican) (until January 22), William Milliken (Republican) (starting January 22)
- Governor of Minnesota: Harold LeVander (Republican)
- Governor of Mississippi: John Bell Williams (Democratic)
- Governor of Missouri: Warren E. Hearnes (Democratic)
- Governor of Montana: Tim M. Babcock (Republican) (until January 6), Forrest H. Anderson (Democratic) (starting January 6)
- Governor of Nebraska: Norbert T. Tiemann (Republican)
- Governor of Nevada: Paul Laxalt (Republican)
- Governor of New Hampshire: John W. King (Democratic) (until January 2), Walter R. Peterson Jr. (Republican) (starting January 2)
- Governor of New Jersey: Richard J. Hughes (Democratic)
- Governor of New Mexico: David F. Cargo (Republican)
- Governor of New York: Nelson Rockefeller (Republican)
- Governor of North Carolina: Dan K. Moore (Democratic) (until January 5), Robert W. Scott (Democratic) (starting January 5)
- Governor of North Dakota: William L. Guy (Democratic)
- Governor of Ohio: Jim Rhodes (Republican)
- Governor of Oklahoma: Dewey F. Bartlett (Republican)
- Governor of Oregon: Tom McCall (Republican)
- Governor of Pennsylvania: Raymond P. Shafer (Republican)
- Governor of Rhode Island: John Chafee (Republican) (until January 7), Frank Licht (Democratic) (starting January 7)
- Governor of South Carolina: Robert Evander McNair (Democratic)
- Governor of South Dakota: Nils Boe (Republican) (until January 7), Frank Farrar (Republican) (starting January 7)
- Governor of Tennessee: Buford Ellington (Democratic)
- Governor of Texas: John Connally (Democratic) (until January 21), Preston Smith (Democratic) (starting January 21)
- Governor of Utah: Cal Rampton (Democratic)
- Governor of Vermont: Philip H. Hoff (Democratic) (until January 9), Deane C. Davis (Republican) (starting January 9)
- Governor of Virginia: Mills E. Godwin Jr. (Democratic)
- Governor of Washington: Daniel J. Evans (Republican)
- Governor of West Virginia: Hulett C. Smith (Democratic) (until January 13), Arch A. Moore Jr. (Republican) (starting January 13)
- Governor of Wisconsin: Warren P. Knowles (Republican)
- Governor of Wyoming: Stanley K. Hathaway (Republican)

=== Lieutenant governors ===
- Lieutenant Governor of Alabama: vacant
- Lieutenant Governor of Alaska: Keith Harvey Miller (Republican) (until January 29), Robert W. Ward (Republican) (starting January 29)
- Lieutenant Governor of Arkansas: Maurice Britt (Republican)
- Lieutenant Governor of California: Robert Hutchinson Finch (Republican) (until January 8), Edwin Reinecke (Republican) (starting January 8)
- Lieutenant Governor of Colorado: Mark Anthony Hogan (Democratic)
- Lieutenant Governor of Connecticut: Attilio R. Frassinelli (Democratic)
- Lieutenant Governor of Delaware: Sherman W. Tribbitt (Democratic) (until January 21), Eugene Bookhammer (Republican) (starting January 21)
- Lieutenant Governor of Florida: vacant (until January 7), Ray Osborne (Republican) (starting January 7)
- Lieutenant Governor of Georgia: George T. Smith (Democratic)
- Lieutenant Governor of Hawaii: Thomas Gill (Democratic)
- Lieutenant Governor of Idaho: Jack M. Murphy (Democratic)
- Lieutenant Governor of Illinois: vacant (until January 13), Paul Simon (Democratic) (starting January 13)
- Lieutenant Governor of Indiana: Robert L. Rock (Democratic) (until January 13), Richard E. Folz (Republican) (starting January 13)
- Lieutenant Governor of Iowa: Robert D. Fulton (Democratic) (until January 1), Roger Jepsen (Republican) (starting January 1)
- Lieutenant Governor of Kansas: John Crutcher (Republican) (until January 13), James H. DeCoursey Jr. (Democratic) (starting January 13)
- Lieutenant Governor of Kentucky: Wendell H. Ford (Democratic)
- Lieutenant Governor of Louisiana: C. C. Aycock (Democratic)
- Lieutenant Governor of Massachusetts: Francis W. Sargent (Republican)
- Lieutenant Governor of Michigan: William G. Milliken (Republican) (until January 22), vacant (starting January 22)
- Lieutenant Governor of Minnesota: James B. Goetz (Republican)
- Lieutenant Governor of Mississippi: Charles L. Sullivan (Democratic)
- Lieutenant Governor of Missouri: Thomas Eagleton (Democratic) (until January 13), William S. Morris (Democratic) (starting January 13)
- Lieutenant Governor of Montana: Ted James (Republican) (until January 6), Thomas Lee Judge (Democratic) (starting January 6)
- Lieutenant Governor of Nebraska: John Everroad (Republican)
- Lieutenant Governor of Nevada: Edward Fike (political party unknown)
- Lieutenant Governor of New Mexico: Elias Lee Francis II (Republican)
- Lieutenant Governor of New York: Malcolm Wilson (Republican)
- Lieutenant Governor of North Carolina: Robert W. Scott (Democratic) (until January 3), Hoyt Patrick Taylor Jr. (Democratic) (starting January 3)
- Lieutenant Governor of North Dakota: Charles Tighe (Democratic) (until month and day unknown), Richard F. Larsen (Republican) (starting month and day unknown)
- Lieutenant Governor of Ohio: John William Brown (Republican)
- Lieutenant Governor of Oklahoma: George Nigh (Democratic)
- Lieutenant Governor of Pennsylvania: Raymond J. Broderick (Republican)
- Lieutenant Governor of Rhode Island: Joseph O'Donnell Jr. (Republican) (until January 7), J. Joseph Garrahy (Democratic) (starting January 7)
- Lieutenant Governor of South Carolina: John C. West (Democratic)
- Lieutenant Governor of South Dakota: Lem Overpeck (Republican) (until January 7), James Abdnor (Republican) (starting January 7)
- Lieutenant Governor of Tennessee: Frank Gorrell (Democratic)
- Lieutenant Governor of Texas: Preston Smith (Democratic) (until January 21), Ben Barnes (Democratic) (starting January 21)
- Lieutenant Governor of Vermont: John J. Daley (Democratic) (until January 9), Thomas L. Hayes (Republican) (starting January 9)
- Lieutenant Governor of Virginia: Fred G. Pollard (Democratic)
- Lieutenant Governor of Washington: John Cherberg (Democratic)
- Lieutenant Governor of Wisconsin: Jack B. Olson (Republican)

== Events ==
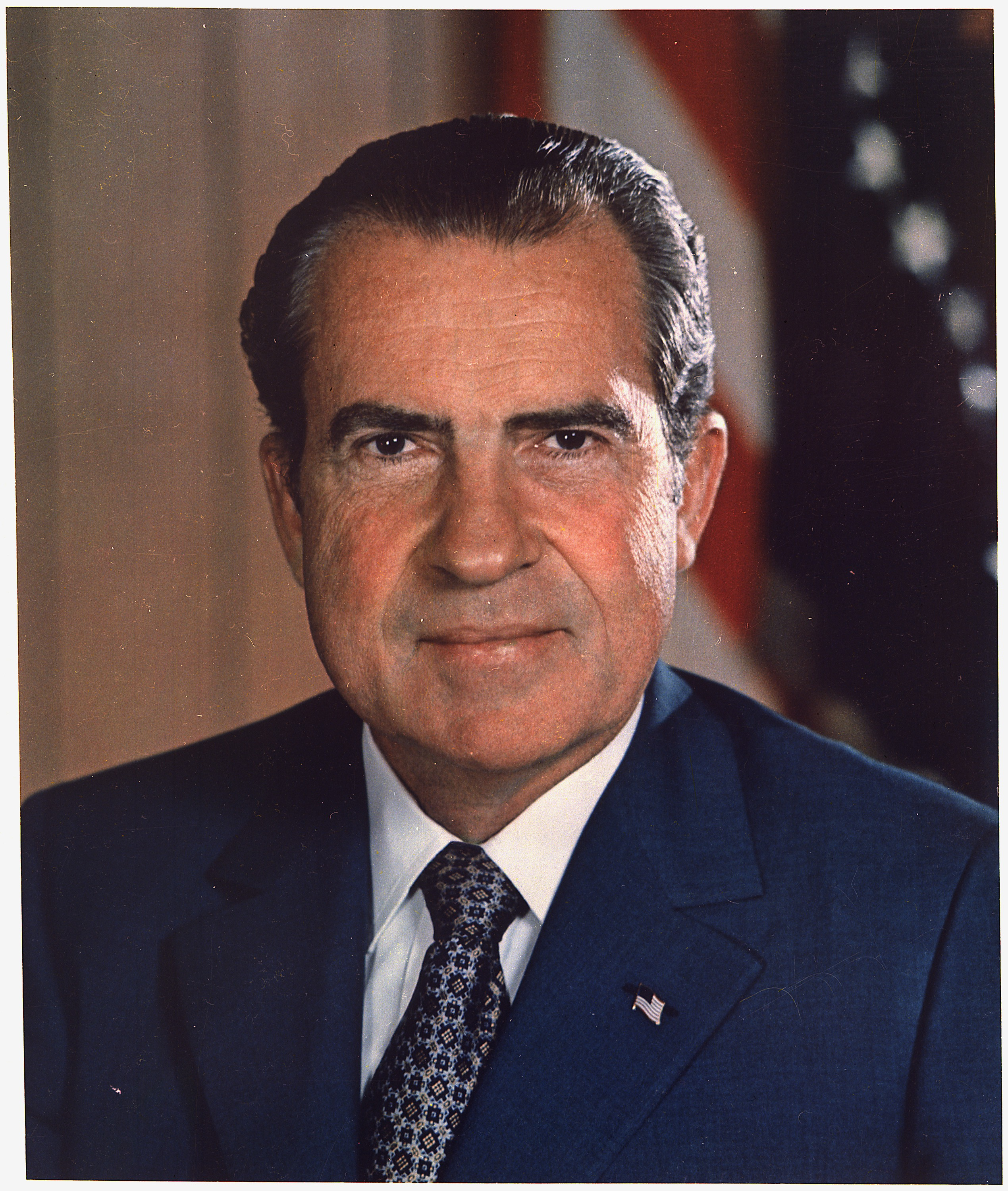
January 20: Richard Nixon becomes the 37th U.S. president

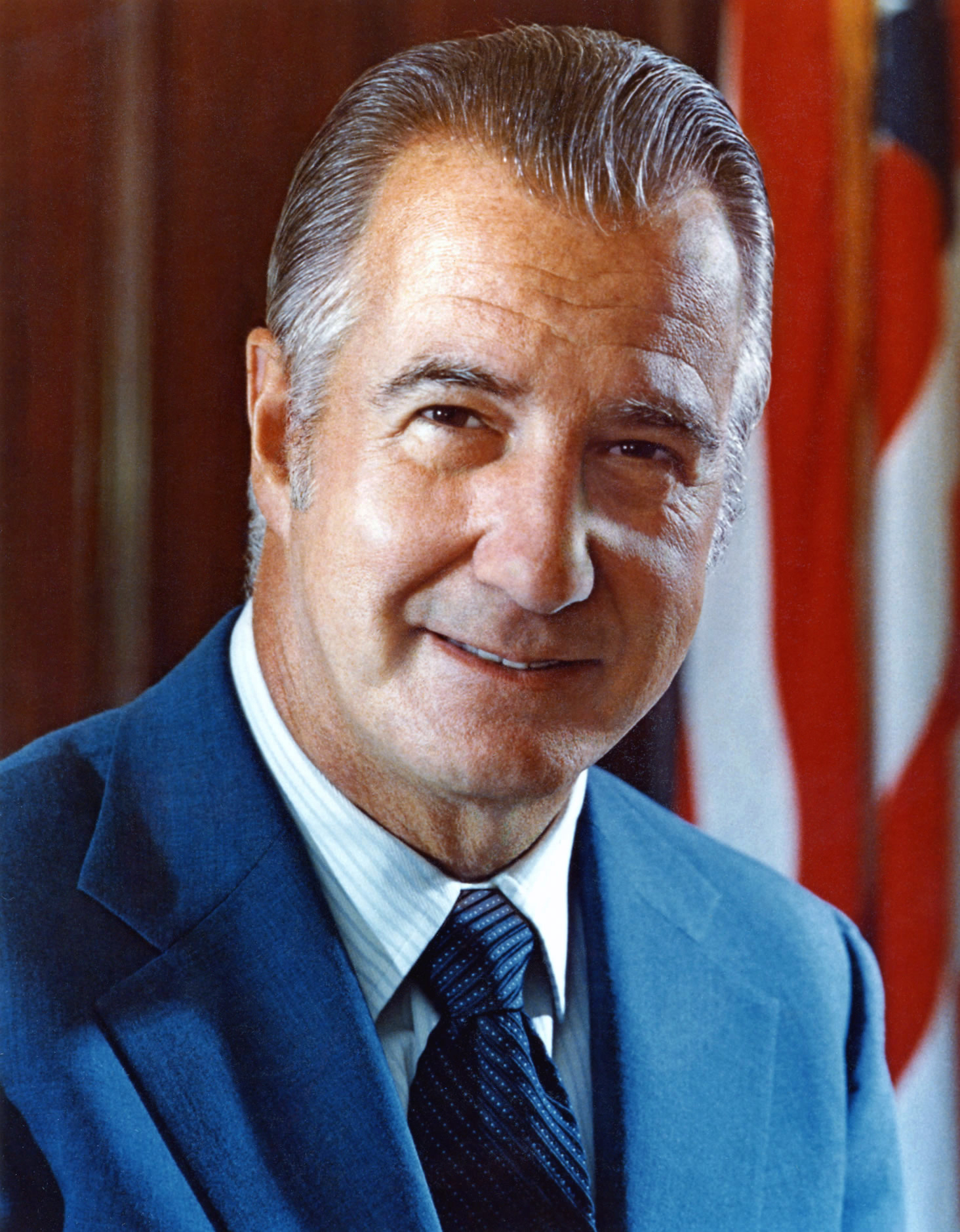
Spiro Agnew becomes the 39th U.S. vice president

=== January ===
- January 1 – In college football, Ohio State defeats UcC in the Rose Bowl Game to win the national title for the 1968 season.
- January 9 – In Washington, D.C., the Smithsonian Institution displays the art of Wineslow Homer for 6 weeks.
- January 12 – Super Bowl III: The New York Jets of the American Football League defeat the heavily favored Baltimore Colts of the National Football League 16–7.
- January 13 – Elvis Presley steps into American Studios in Memphis, Tennessee, recording "Long Black Limousine" thus beginning the recording of what becomes his landmark comeback sessions for the albums "From Elvis In Memphis" and "Back in Memphis." The sessions yield the popular and critically acclaimed singles "Suspicious Minds", "In the Ghetto" and "Kentucky Rain."
- January 14
  - USS Enterprise fire: An explosion aboard aircraft carrier USS Enterprise near Hawaii kills 27 and injures 314.
  - CBS greenlights Peanuts as a primetime television series. It runs for one season commencing April 10.
- January 16 – Ten paintings are defaced in New York's Metropolitan Museum of Art.
- January 18 – In Washington, D.C., the Smithsonian Institution displays the art of Winslow Homer for 6 weeks.
- January 20 – Richard Nixon is sworn in as the 37th president of the United States, and Spiro Agnew is sworn in as the 39th vice president.
- January 26 – Elvis Presley steps into American Studios in Memphis, Tennessee, recording "Long Black Limousine", thus beginning the recording of what becomes his landmark comeback sessions for the albums From Elvis in Memphis and Back in Memphis. The sessions yield the popular and critically acclaimed singles "Suspicious Minds", "In the Ghetto", and "Kentucky Rain".
- January 27 – The modern-day powerhouse of the Hetch Hetchy Project at Moccasin, California, rated at 100,000 kVA, is completed and placed in operation. On February 7, the original is removed from service.
- January 28 – 1969 Santa Barbara oil spill: A blowout on Union Oil's Platform A in the Dos Cuadras Offshore Oil Field spills 80,000 to 100,000 barrels of crude oil into a channel and onto the beaches of Santa Barbara County in Southern California; on February 5 the oil spill closes Santa Barbara's harbor. The incident inspires Wisconsin Senator Gaylord Nelson to organize the first Earth Day in 1970.

=== February ===
- February 5
  - Aquanaut Berry L. Cannon dies of carbon dioxide poisoning while attempting to repair the SEALAB III habitat off San Clemente Island, California.
  - Four hundred Major League Baseball players boycott spring training over owners' refusal to increase their pension-fund contributions along with television broadcast revenues.
  - The U.S. population reaches 200 million.
  - The controversial television show Turn-On premieres on the ABC network and is canceled after one episode following protests by viewers and ABC affiliate stations.
- February 8 – The last issue of The Saturday Evening Post in its original form hits magazine stands after 147 years.
- February 9 – The Boeing 747 makes its maiden flight, from Paine Field at Everett, Washington.
- February 24
  - The Mariner 6 Mars probe is launched from Cape Canaveral Air Force Station.
  - Tinker v. Des Moines Independent Community School District: The U.S. Supreme Court rules that the First Amendment applies to public schools.
- February 26 – The baseball players' boycott of spring training is settled, largely on their terms.

=== March ===
- March 3
  - In a Los Angeles court, Sirhan Sirhan admits that he killed presidential candidate Robert F. Kennedy.
  - Apollo program: NASA launches Apollo 9 (James McDivitt, David Scott, Rusty Schweickart) to test the Apollo Lunar Module.
- March 4 – Arrest warrants are issued by a Florida court for Jim Morrison on charges of indecent exposure during a Doors concert three days earlier.
- March 10 – In Memphis, Tennessee, James Earl Ray pleads guilty to assassinating Martin Luther King Jr. (he later retracts his guilty plea).
  - The United States Navy establishes the Navy Fighter Weapons School (also known as Top Gun) at Naval Air Station Miramar.
  - The novel The Godfather by Mario Puzo is first distributed to booksellers by the publisher G. P. Putnam's Sons.
- March 13 – Apollo program: Apollo 9 returns safely to Earth after testing the Lunar Module.
- March 18 – Operation Breakfast, the covert bombing of Cambodia by U.S. planes, begins.
- March 28 – Former United States General and President Dwight D. Eisenhower dies after a long illness in the Walter Reed Army Medical Center, Washington, D.C..

=== April ===
- April 9 – The Harvard University Administration Building is seized by close to 300 students, mostly members of the Students for a Democratic Society. Before the takeover ends, 45 are injured and 184 are arrested.
- April 14 – The 41st Academy Awards ceremony, the first with no official host since 1939, is held at Dorothy Chandler Pavilion in Los Angeles. Carol Reed's Oliver! receives 11 nominations and wins five awards, including Best Picture and Best Director for Reed. Stanley Kubrick also receives his only Oscar win - Best Visual Effects for 2001: A Space Odyssey.
- April 20 – A grassroots movement of Berkeley community members seizes an empty lot owned by the University of California, to begin the formation of "People's Park".

=== May ===
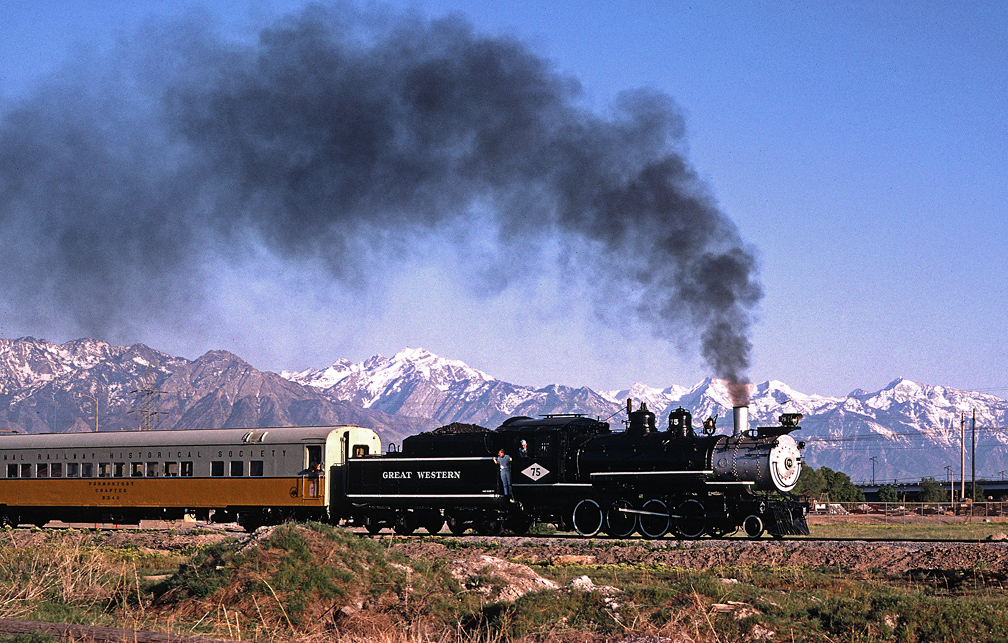
May 9, 1969: excursion train on the Salt Lake, Garfield and Western Railway as part of the 1969 Golden Spike Centennial

- May 1 – Semiconductor company AMD is founded.
- May 10 – Zip to Zap, a harbinger of the Woodstock Concert, ends with the dispersal and eviction of youth and young adults at Zap, North Dakota, by the National Guard.
- May 15 – A teenager known as 'Robert R.' dies in St. Louis, Missouri, of a baffling medical condition. In 1984 it will be identified as the first confirmed case of HIV/AIDS in North America.
- May 18 – Apollo program: Apollo 10 (Tom Stafford, Gene Cernan, John Young) is launched, on the full dress-rehearsal for the Moon landing.
- May 20 – United States National Guard helicopters spray skin-stinging powder on protesters in Berkeley, California, in the aftermath of the People's Park unrest.
- May 21 – Shirley Chisholm appears before Congress to speak about prejudices facing women in the workforce and the need for equal rights for women.
- May 22 – Apollo program: Apollo 10's lunar module flies to within 15,400 m of the Moon's surface.
- May 25 – Midnight Cowboy, an X-rated, Oscar-winning John Schlesinger film, is released.
- May 26 – Apollo program: Apollo 10 returns to Earth, after a successful 8-day test of all the components needed for the upcoming first crewed Moon landing.

=== June ===
- June 3 – Melbourne-Evans collision: The Australian aircraft carrier HMAS Melbourne collides with the U.S. destroyer USS Frank E. Evans in the South China Sea; 74 U.S. sailors are killed.
- June 8 – U.S. President Richard Nixon and South Vietnamese President Nguyễn Văn Thiệu meet at Midway Island. Nixon announces that 25,000 U.S. troops will be withdrawn by September.
- June 18–22 – The National Convention of the Students for a Democratic Society (SDS), held in Chicago, collapses, and the Weatherman faction seizes control of the SDS National Office. Thereafter, any activity run from the National Office or bearing the name of SDS is Weatherman-controlled.
- June 23 – Warren E. Burger is sworn in as Chief Justice of the United States by retiring Chief Justice Earl Warren.
- June 28 – The Stonewall riots in New York City mark the start of the modern gay rights movement in the U.S.

=== July ===
- July 4 – Michael Mageau and Darlene Ferrin are shot at Blue Rock Springs in California. They are the second (known) victims of the Zodiac Killer. Mageau survives the attack while Ferrin is pronounced dead-on-arrival at Richmond Medical Center.
- July 8 – Vietnam War: The first U.S. troop withdrawals are made.
- July 14 – The $500, $1,000, $5,000, and $10,000 bills are officially removed from circulation.
- July 16 – Apollo program: Apollo 11 (Neil Armstrong, Buzz Aldrin, Michael Collins) lifts off from Cape Kennedy toward the first human landing on the Moon.
- July 17 – The New York Times publicly takes back the ridicule of the rocket scientist Robert H. Goddard published on January 13, 1920, that stated that spaceflight is impossible.
- July 18 – Chappaquiddick incident – Ted Kennedy drives off a bridge after leaving a party on Chappaquiddick Island, Massachusetts. Mary Jo Kopechne, a former campaign aide to his brother Robert, dies in the early morning hours of July 19 in the submerged car.
- July 20 – Apollo program Moon landing: At 3:17 pm ET (20:17 UTC) Apollo 11's Lunar Module Eagle lands on the Moon's surface. At 10:56 pm ET (02:56 UTC July 21), an estimated 650 million people worldwide watch in awe as Neil Armstrong takes the first historic steps by a human on the surface.
- July 21 – A. D. King, younger brother of Martin Luther King Jr., dies at age 38.
- July 24 – Apollo program: Armstrong, Aldrin, and Collins return safely to Earth after the first landing on the Moon.
- July 25 – Vietnam War: U.S. President Richard Nixon declares the Nixon Doctrine, stating that the United States now expects its Asian allies to take care of their own military defense. This starts the "Vietnamization" of the war.
- July 26 – The New York Chapter of the Young Lords is founded to fight for empowerment of Puerto Ricans.
- July 30 – Vietnam War: U.S. President Richard Nixon makes an unscheduled visit to South Vietnam, meeting with President Nguyễn Văn Thiệu and U.S. military commanders.

=== August ===
- August 4 – Vietnam War: At the apartment of French intermediary Jean Sainteny in Paris, U.S. representative Henry Kissinger and North Vietnamese representative Xuan Thuy begin secret peace negotiations. They eventually fail since both sides cannot agree to any terms.
- August 5 – Mariner program: Mariner 7 makes its closest fly-by of Mars (3,524 kilometers).
- August 9 – Members of a cult led by Charles Manson murder Sharon Tate (who was 8 months pregnant) and her friends: Folgers coffee heiress Abigail Folger, Wojciech Frykowski, and Hollywood hairstylist Jay Sebring at Roman Polanski's home in Los Angeles. Also killed was Steven Parent, leaving from a visit to the home's caretaker. More than 100 stab wounds are found on the victims, except for Parent, who had been shot almost as soon as the Manson Family entered the property.
- August 10 – The Manson Family kills Leno and Rosemary LaBianca, wealthy Los Angeles business people.
- August 15 – Captain D's is founded as "Mr. D's Seafood and Hamburgers" by Ray Danner with its first location opening in Donelson, Tennessee.
- August 15–18 – The Woodstock Festival is held in upstate New York, featuring some of the era's top rock musicians.
- August 17 – Category 5 Hurricane Camille, the most powerful tropical cyclonic system at landfall in history, hits the Mississippi coast, killing 248 people and causing US$1.5 billion in damage (1969 dollars).
- August 20 – Florissant Fossil Beds National Monument is established in Florissant, Colorado.
- August 21 – Donald and Doris Fisher open the first Gap store on Ocean Avenue in San Francisco.

=== September ===
- September 2 – The first automatic teller machine in the United States is installed in Rockville Centre, New York.
- September 5 – My Lai Massacre: Lieutenant William Calley is charged with six counts of premeditated murder, for the deaths of 109 Vietnamese civilians in My Lai.
- September 6 – Children's TV series H.R. Pufnstuf begins its run on NBC. It was also a segment in The Banana Splits Adventure Hour season 2.
- September 9 – Allegheny Airlines Flight 853 DC-9 collides in flight with a Piper PA-28, and crashes near Fairland, Indiana.
- September 13 – Scooby-Doo, Where Are You!, Dastardly and Muttley in Their Flying Machines, and The Perils of Penelope Pitstop are broadcast for the first time on CBS.
- September 14 – Men who were born during the years from 1944 to 1951, and who celebrate their birthdays on this day, mark the occasion without being aware that September 14 will be the first date selected in the new U.S. draft lottery on December 1.
- September 20 – The last Warner Bros. cartoon of the original theatrical Looney Tunes series is released: Injun Trouble.
- September 23 – Butch Cassidy and the Sundance Kid, a film starring Paul Newman and Robert Redford, opens to limited release in the U.S.
- September 24 – The Chicago Eight trial begins in Chicago, Illinois.
- September 25 – DHL, a worldwide logistics and delivery service, is founded in California.
- September 26 – The Brady Bunch premieres on ABC.

=== October ===
1969 Wal-Mart logo

- October 1 – The 5.6 M_{w} Santa Rosa earthquake shook the North Bay area of California with a maximum Mercalli intensity of VII (Very strong). This first event in a doublet earthquake was followed two hours later by a 5.7 M_{w} shock. Total financial losses from the events was $8.35 million.
- October 2 – A 1.2 megaton thermonuclear device is tested at Amchitka Island, Alaska. This test is code-named Project Milrow, the 11th test of the Operation Mandrel 1969–1970 underground nuclear test series. This test is known as a "calibration shot" to test if the island is fit for larger underground nuclear detonations.
- October 9–12 – Days of Rage: In Chicago, the United States National Guard is called in to control demonstrations involving the radical Weathermen, in connection with the "Chicago Eight" Trial.
- October 11 – The Zodiac Killer murders taxi cab driver Paul Stine in San Francisco, California.
- October 15 – Moratorium to End the War in Vietnam: 15 million Americans march against the Vietnam War.
- October 16 – The "miracle" New York Mets win the World Series, beating the heavily favored Baltimore Orioles 4 games to 1.
- October 17
  - Willard S. Boyle and George Smith invent the CCD at Bell Laboratories (30 years later, this technology is widely used in digital cameras).
  - Fourteen black athletes are dismissed from the University of Wyoming football team for wearing black armbands into their coach's office.
- October 31 – Wal-Mart incorporates as Wal-Mart Stores, Inc.

=== November ===
- November 3 – Vietnam War: U.S. President Richard Nixon addresses the nation on television and radio, asking the "silent majority" to join him in solidarity with the Vietnam War effort, and to support his policies. Vice President Spiro T. Agnew denounces the President's critics as "an effete corps of impudent snobs" and "nattering nabobs of negativism".
- November 9 – A group of American Indians, led by Richard Oakes, seizes Alcatraz Island as a symbolic gesture, offering to buy the property for $24 from the U.S. government. A longer occupation begins 11 days later. The act inspires a wave of renewed Indian pride and government reform.
- November 10 – The children's television show Sesame Street premieres on NET (now PBS).
- November 12 – Vietnam War – My Lai Massacre: Independent investigative journalist Seymour Hersh breaks the My Lai story.
- November 14 – Apollo program: NASA launches Apollo 12 (Pete Conrad, Richard Gordon, Alan Bean), the second crewed mission to the Moon.
- November 15
  - Cold War: The Soviet submarine K-19 collides with the American submarine USS Gato in the Barents Sea.
  - Vietnam War: In Washington, D.C., 250,000–500,000 protesters stage a peaceful demonstration against the war, including a symbolic "March Against Death".
  - Dave Thomas opens his first restaurant in a former steakhouse in downtown Columbus, Ohio. He names the chain Wendy's after his 8-year-old daughter Melinda Lou (nicknamed Wendy by her siblings).
- November 17 – Cold War: Negotiators from the Soviet Union and the United States meet in Helsinki, to begin the SALT I negotiations aimed at limiting the number of strategic weapons on both sides.
- November 19 – Apollo program: Apollo 12 astronauts Pete Conrad and Alan Bean land at Oceanus Procellarum ("Ocean of Storms"), becoming the third and fourth humans to walk on the Moon.
- November 20
  - Vietnam War: The Plain Dealer (Cleveland, Ohio) publishes explicit photographs of dead villagers from the My Lai massacre in Vietnam.
  - Occupation of Alcatraz: A group of Native American activists calling themselves "Indians of All Tribes" begin an 18-month occupation of Alcatraz Island as surplus federal land, to call attention to U.S. policies and treaty obligations to Native Americans and their tribal communities.
- November 21
  - U.S. President Richard Nixon and Japanese Premier Eisaku Satō agree in Washington, D.C., to the return of Okinawa to Japanese control in 1972. Under the terms of the agreement, the U.S. retains rights to military bases on the island, but they must be nuclear-free.
  - The United States Senate votes down the Supreme Court nomination of Clement Haynsworth, the first such rejection since 1930.
- November 22 – College football: Michigan ends Ohio State's 22-game winning streak with a 24–12 upset at Ann Arbor, denying the Buckeyes their second consecutive national championship.
- November 24 – Apollo program: The Apollo 12 spacecraft splashes down safely in the Pacific Ocean, ending the second crewed mission to the Moon.
- November 25 – John Lennon returns his MBE medal to protest the British government's support of the U.S. war in Vietnam.

=== December ===
- December 1 – Chicago: Blues musician Magic Sam dies at the age of 32 of a heart attack.
- December 1 – Vietnam War: The first draft lottery in the United States is held since World War II (on January 4, 1970, The New York Times will run a long article, "Statisticians Charge Draft Lottery Was Not Random").
- December 2 – The Boeing 747 jumbo jet makes its debut. It carries 191 people, most of them reporters and photographers, from Seattle to New York City.
- December 4
  - Black Panther Party members Fred Hampton and Mark Clark are shot dead in their sleep during a raid by 14 Chicago police officers.
  - A Boy Named Charlie Brown, the first feature film based on the Peanuts comic strip, was released to theaters for the first time.
- December 6
  - The Altamont Free Concert is held at the Altamont Speedway in northern California. Hosted by the Rolling Stones, it is an attempt at a "Woodstock West" and is best known for the uproar of violence that occurred. It is viewed by many as the "end of the sixties."
  - College football: #1 ranked Texas rallies from 14–0 deficit with two fourth quarter touchdowns to edge #2 Arkansas 15–14 at Fayetteville in a game attended by President of the United States Richard Nixon and several high-ranking government dignitaries, including future President George H. W. Bush. The victory clinches the national championship of the coaches poll for the Longhorns; they would win the Associated Press national championship by defeating Notre Dame 21–17 in the Cotton Bowl on New Year's Day.
- December 7 – Frosty the Snowman airs for the first time on CBS.
- December 12 – The Piazza Fontana bombing in Italy (Strage di Piazza Fontana) takes place. A U.S. Navy officer and C.I.A. agent, David Carrett, is later investigated for possible involvement.
- December 28 – The Young Lords take over the First Spanish Methodist Church in East Harlem.

=== Undated ===
- Reported as being the year the first strain of the AIDS virus (HIV) migrated to the United States via Haiti.
- The Water Rights Determination and Administration Act is passed in Colorado.
- The weather station of Mount Washington, New Hampshire, records the heaviest calendar year precipitation in the US east of the Cascades with 130.14 inches (3,305.6 mm), beating the previous record of Rosman, North Carolina, by 0.54 inches (13.7 mm).
- Fall – First-generation Dodge Challenger automobile introduced in the United States.
- Women are allowed membership in the Future Farmers of America (the later National FFA Organization).
- Arthur Treacher's Fish and Chips is founded by S. Robert Davis and Dave Thomas and its first location in Columbus, Ohio opens for business.

=== Ongoing ===
- Cold War (1947–1991)
- Space Race (1957–1975)
- Vietnam War, U.S. involvement (1964–1973)
- Détente (c. 1969–1979)

== Births ==
=== January ===
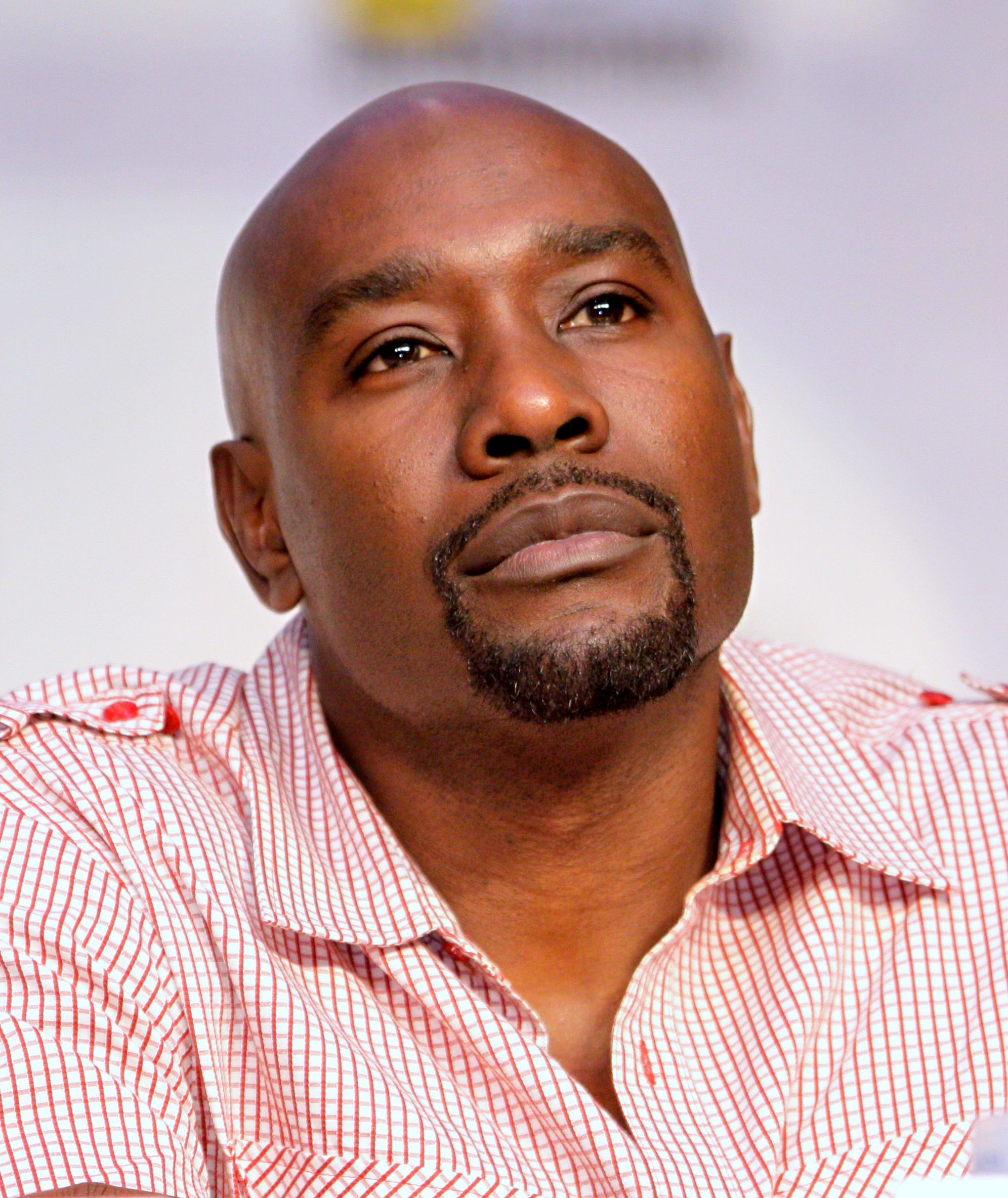
Morris Chestnut

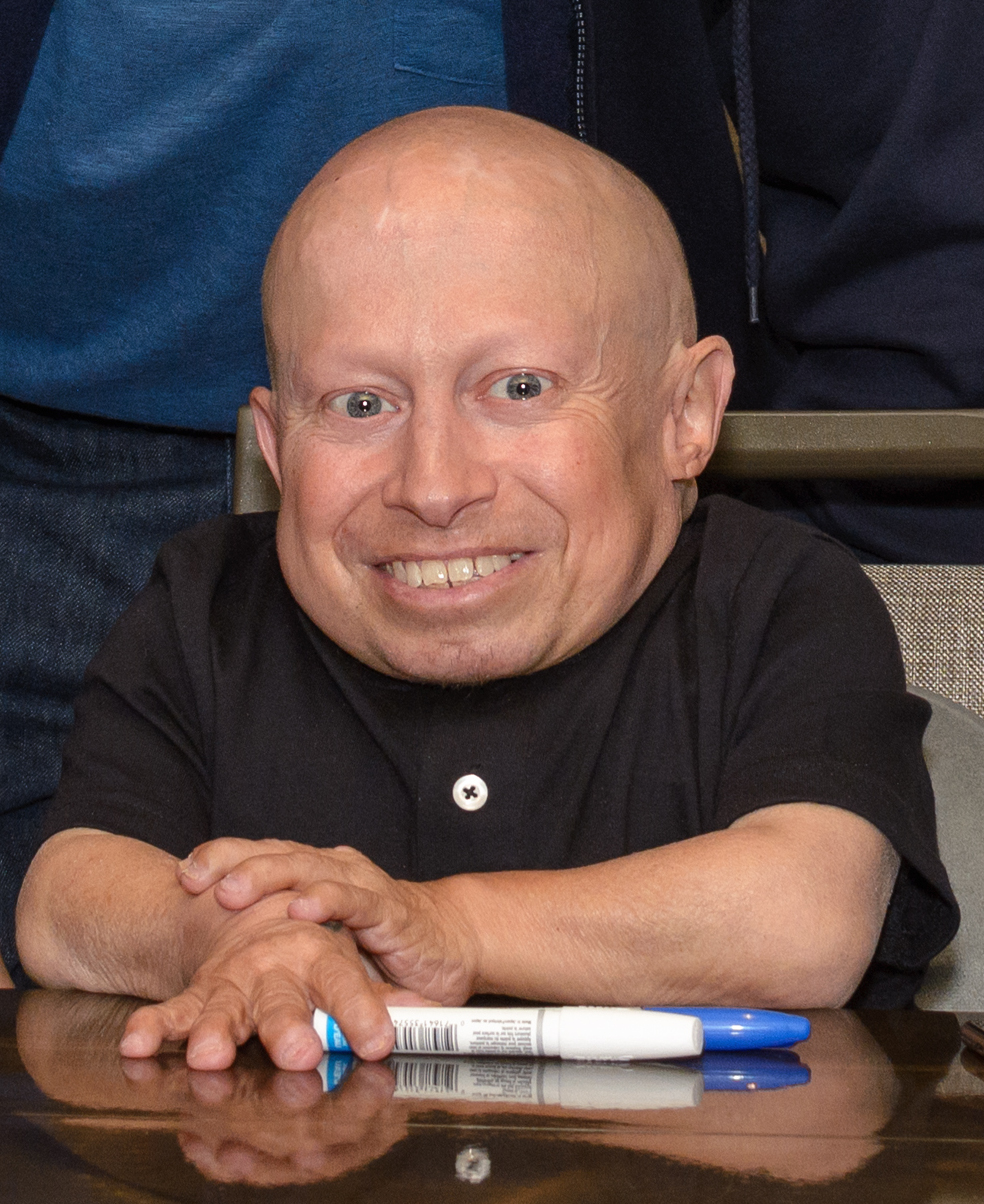
Verne Troyer

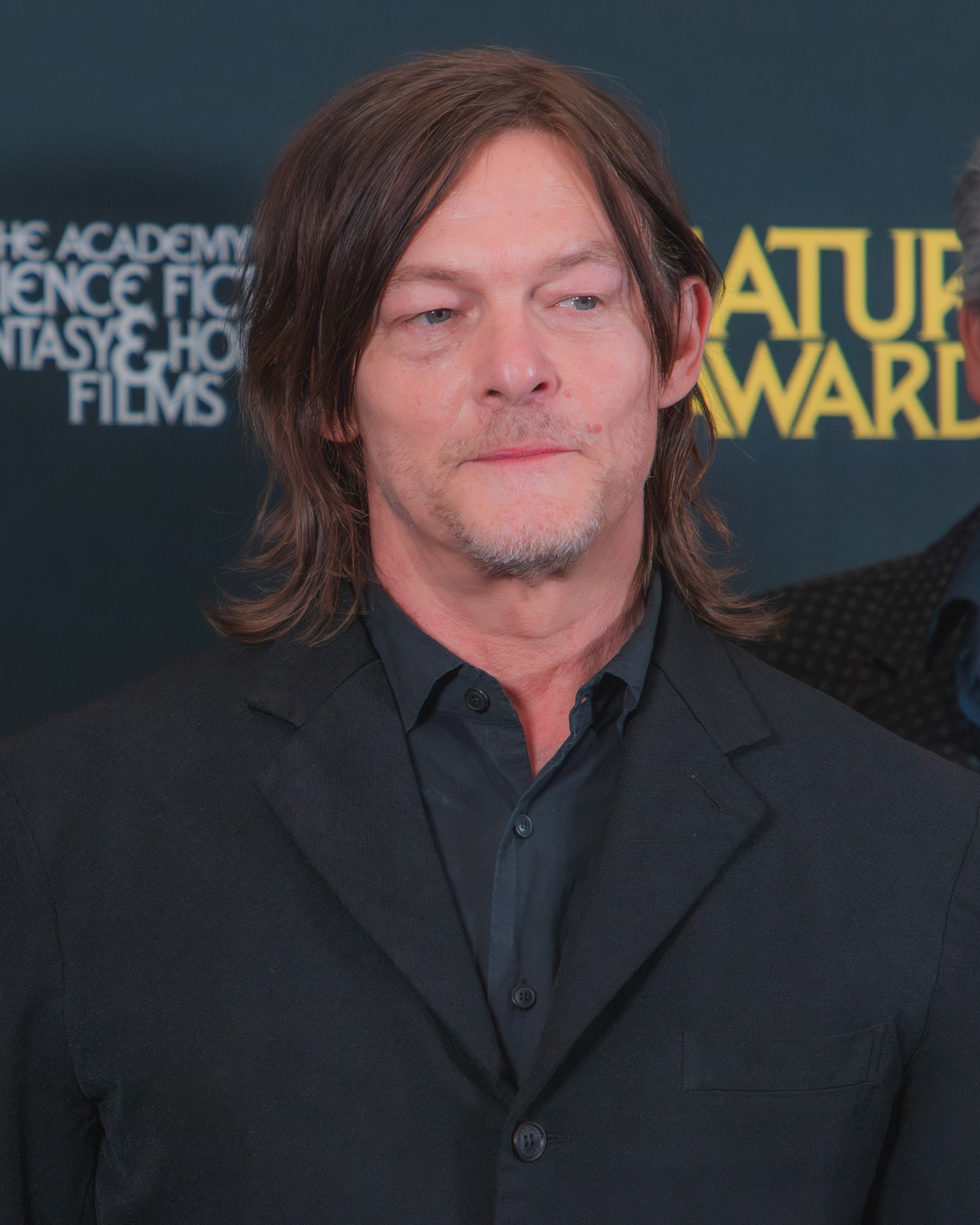
Norman Reedus

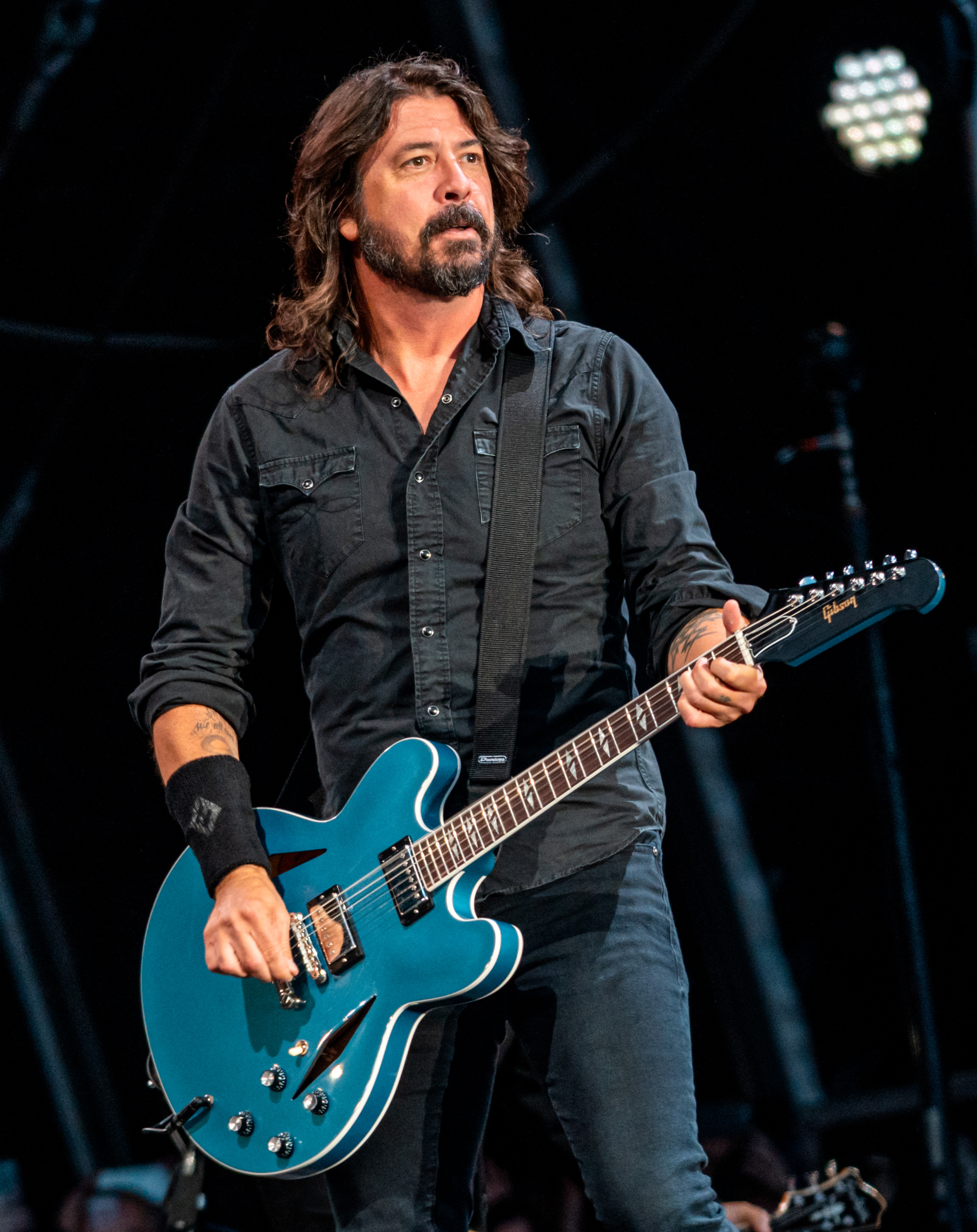
Dave Grohl

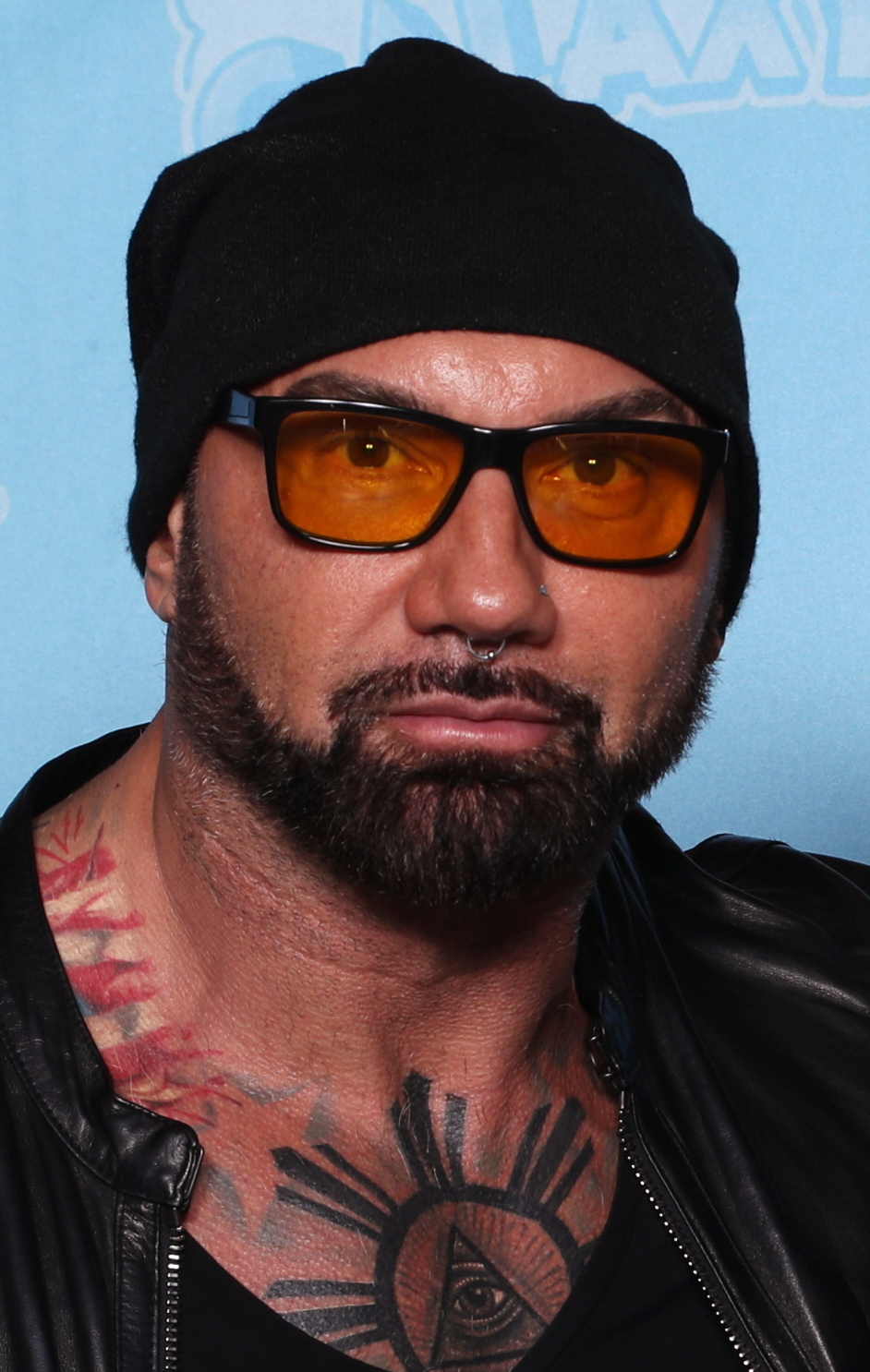
Dave Bautista

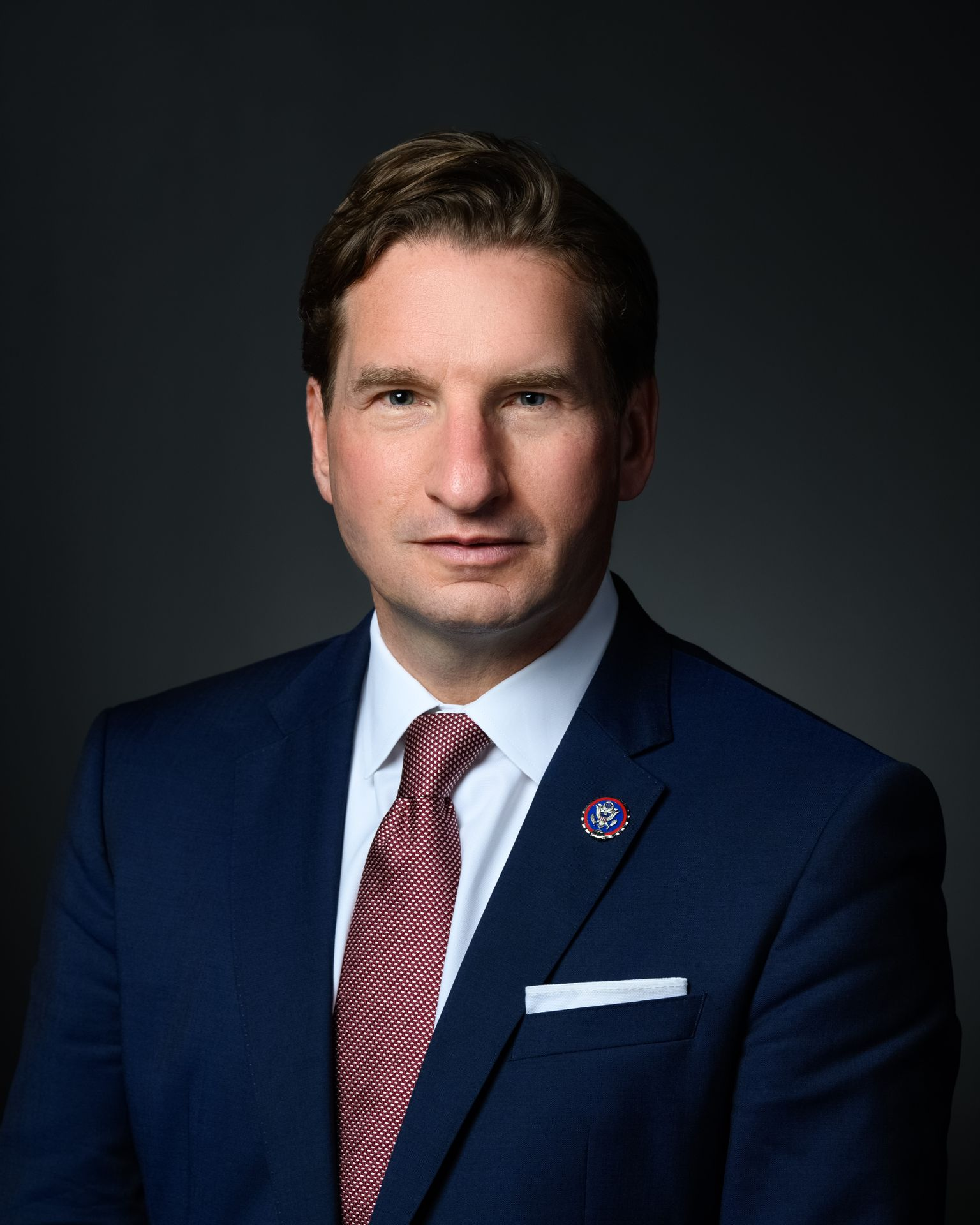
Dean Phillips

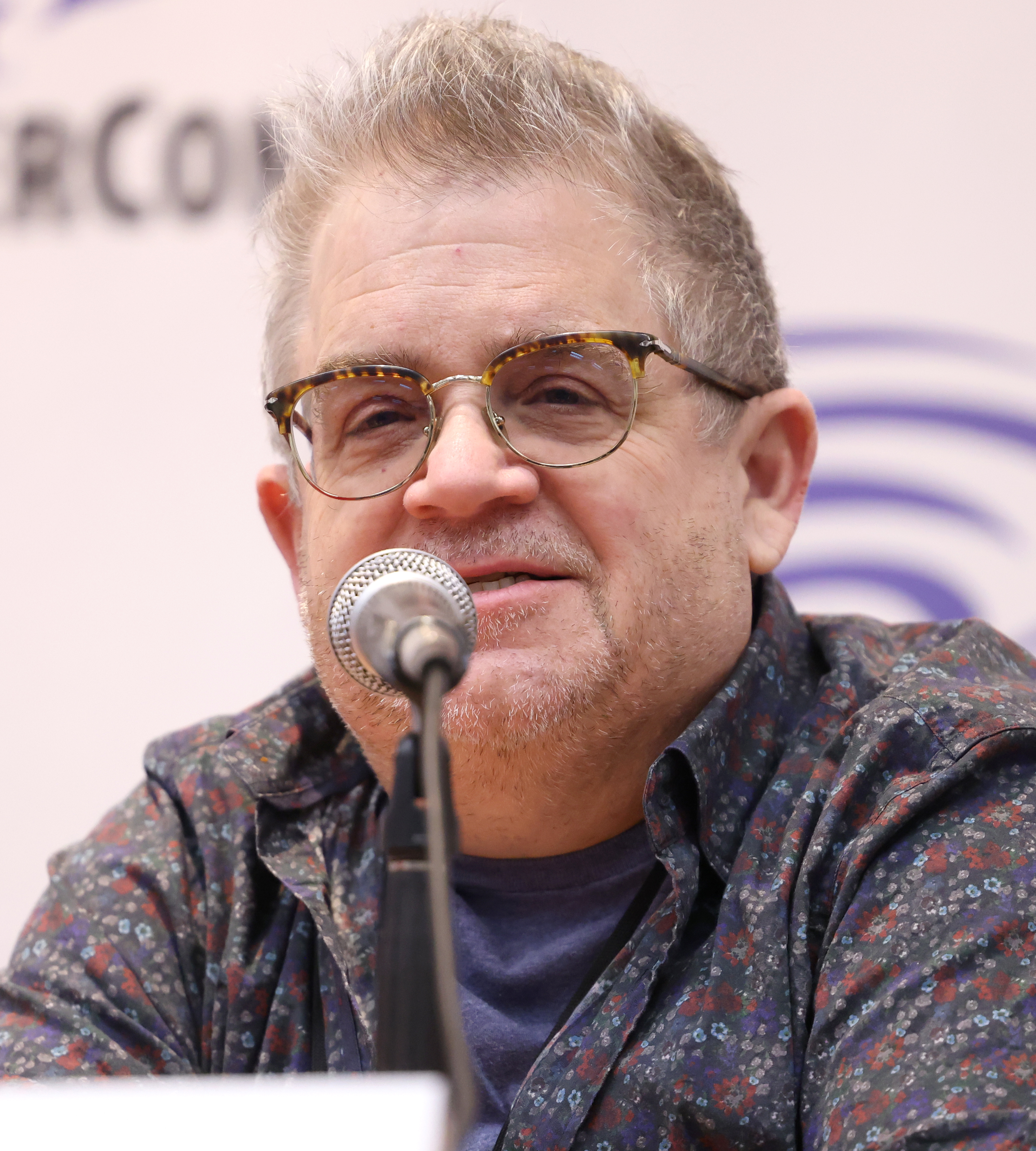
Patton Oswalt

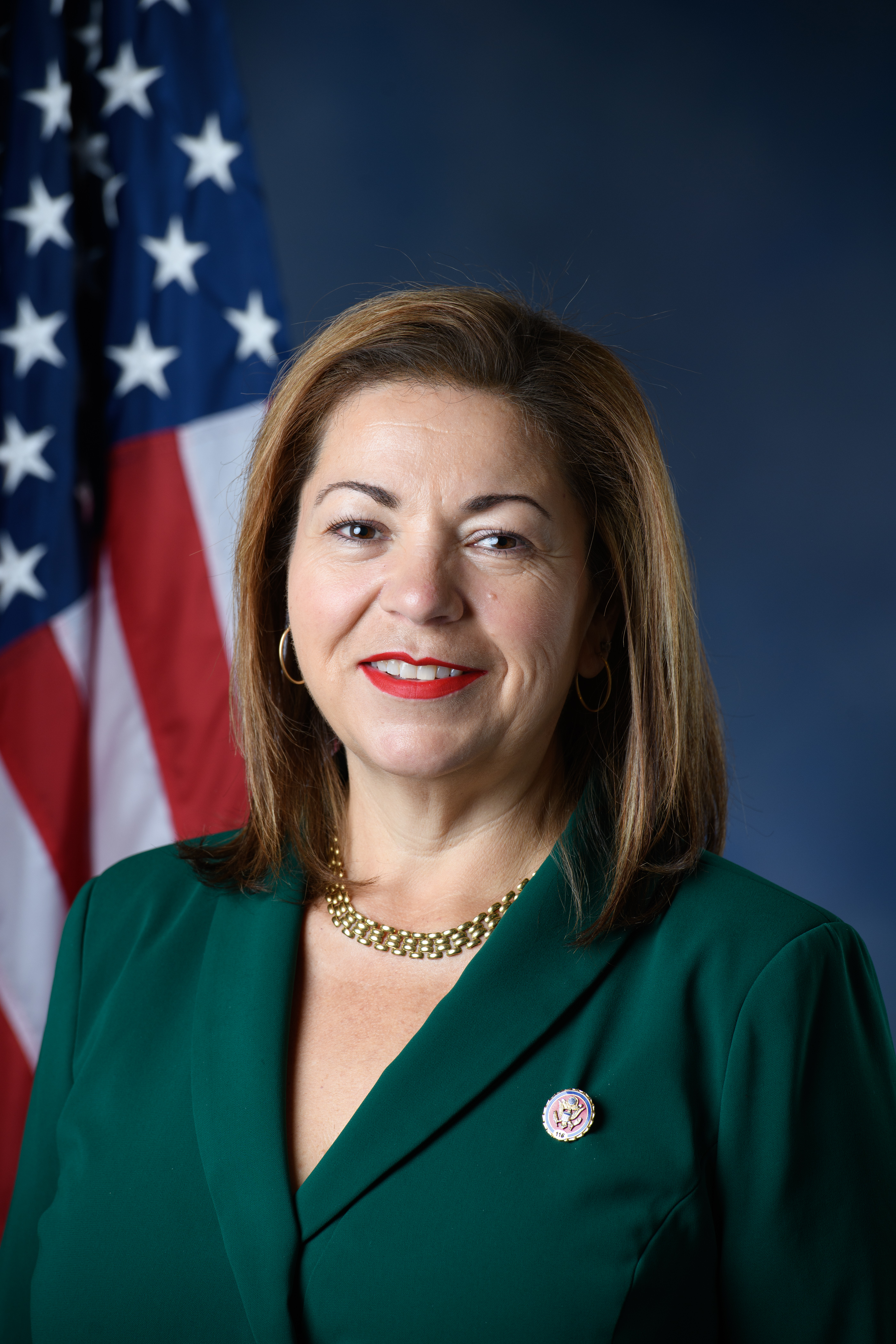
Linda Sánchez

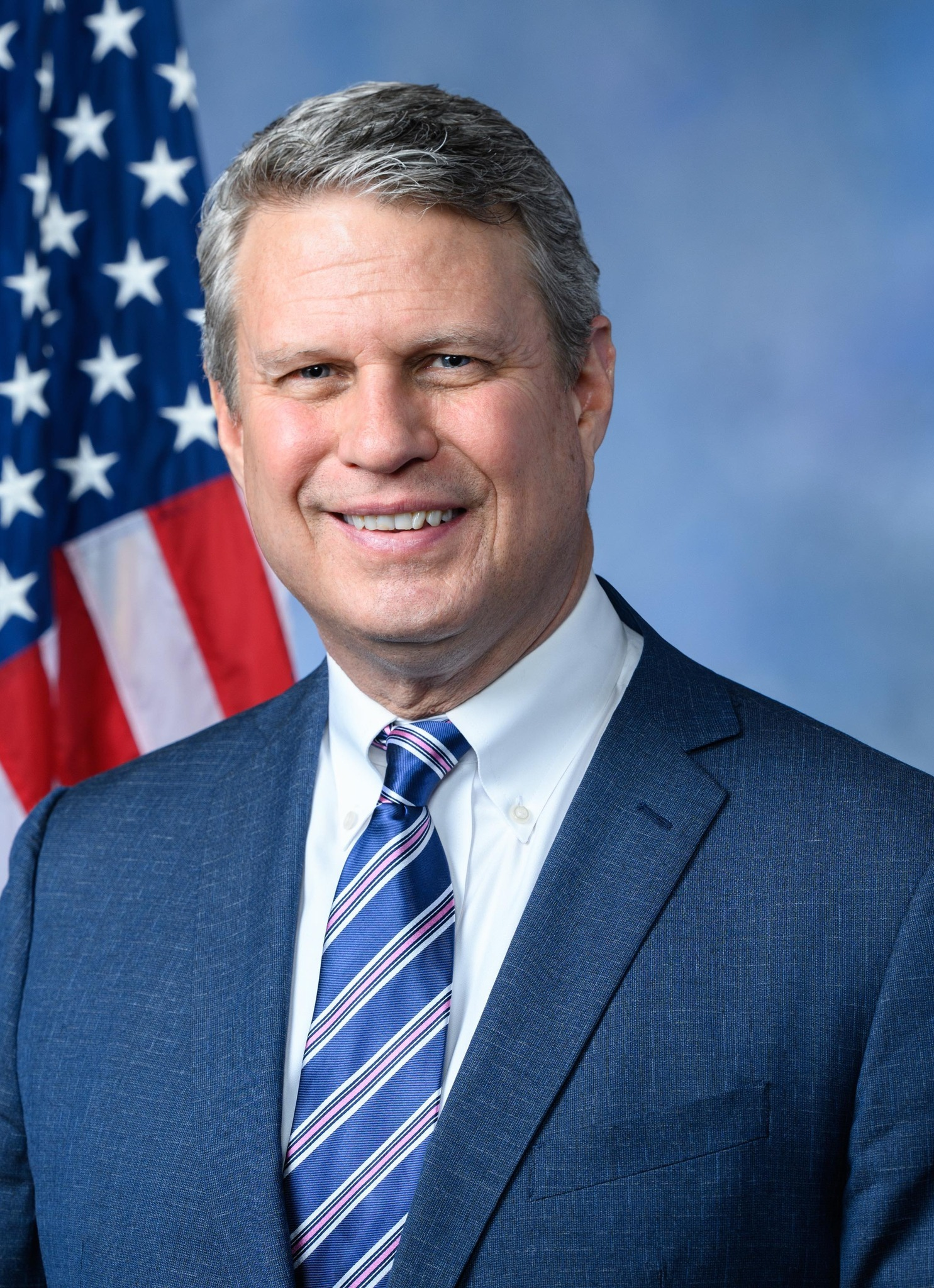
Bill Huizenga

- January 1
  - Morris Chestnut, actor and producer
  - Victoria Chun, volleyball player and athletic director for Yale University
  - Verne Troyer, actor (d. 2018)
  - Mr. Lawrence, animator, writer, voice actor, and comedian
- January 2
  - Jimmy Cicero, wrestler
  - Derek Croxton, historian
  - Robby Gordon, race car driver
  - Tommy Morrison, boxer and actor (d. 2013)
  - Christy Turlington, fashion model
- January 3
  - James Carter, jazz musician
  - Lorenzo Fertitta, entrepreneur, casino executive, and sports promoter
- January 4
  - Corie Blount, basketball player and coach
  - William L. Campbell Jr., lawyer and judge
  - Marla Runyan, runner and long jumper
- January 5
  - Kurt Barber, football player
  - William A. Barclay, politician
  - Robbie Crane, bassist for Black Star Riders
  - Marilyn Manson, rock musician and painter
  - Guy Torry, actor and comedian
  - Shea Whigham, actor
- January 6
  - Aron Eisenberg, actor and filmmaker (d. 2019)
  - Norman Reedus, actor and model
- January 7
  - Andrew Berman, preservationist
  - Heather Childers, news anchor
  - Rex Lee, actor
  - David Yost, actor
- January 8
  - Brian Boehringer, baseball player
  - J. Hunter Johnson, game designer, author, and translator
- January 11
  - Corey Black, horse jockey
  - Dave Cruikshank, Olympic speedskater
  - Kyle Richards, actress
- January 12
  - Andrew L. Carter Jr., lawyer and judge
  - Paul Collins, University professor and writer
- January 13 – Bobby Bounds, football player
- January 14
  - Jason Bateman, actor, director, and producer
  - David Berganio Jr., golfer
  - Dave Grohl, singer/songwriter, drummer for Nirvana, and guitarist and frontman for Foo Fighters
  - Randy Feenstra, politician
- January 15 – Adam Burt, ice hockey player
- January 16
  - Carey Bailey, football player and coach
  - Chris Bratton, drummer
  - Terrance Carroll, minister and politician
- January 17 – Michael Moynihan, journalist and publisher
- January 18
  - Dave Bautista, actor, mixed martial artist, and wrestler
  - Jesse L. Martin, actor and singer
- January 19
  - Nicole Akins Boyd, attorney, businesswoman, and politician
  - Junior Seau, football player (d. 2012)
  - Casey Sherman, journalist and author
- January 20
  - Andre Cason, sprinter
  - Patrick K. Kroupa, writer and hacker
  - Dean Phillips, politician
- January 21
  - Brian Baldridge, politician
  - Sean D. Carr, Executive Director and CEO of the Global Innovation Exchange at the University of Washington
  - M. K. Hobson, speculative fiction author
- January 22
  - Shelly Brooks, serial killer
  - Vinnie Clark, football player
  - Olivia d'Abo, actress and singer
- January 24 – Shane Balkowitsch, photographer
- January 25 – Eric Banks, composer
- January 27
  - Lisa Cerasoli, actress
  - Patton Oswalt, stand-up comedian, writer, actor, and voice artist
- January 28
  - Tank Collins, basketball player
  - Doug Ericksen, politician and lobbyist (d. 2021)
  - Kathryn Morris, actress
  - Mo Rocca, humorist, journalist and actor
  - Linda Sánchez, politician
- January 31
  - Craig Carton, radio and television personality
  - Bill Huizenga, politician

=== February ===
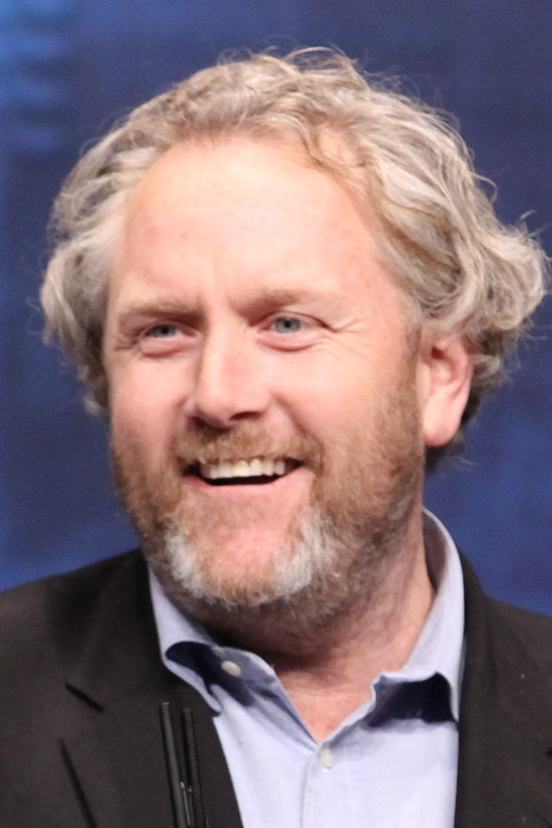
Andrew Breitbart

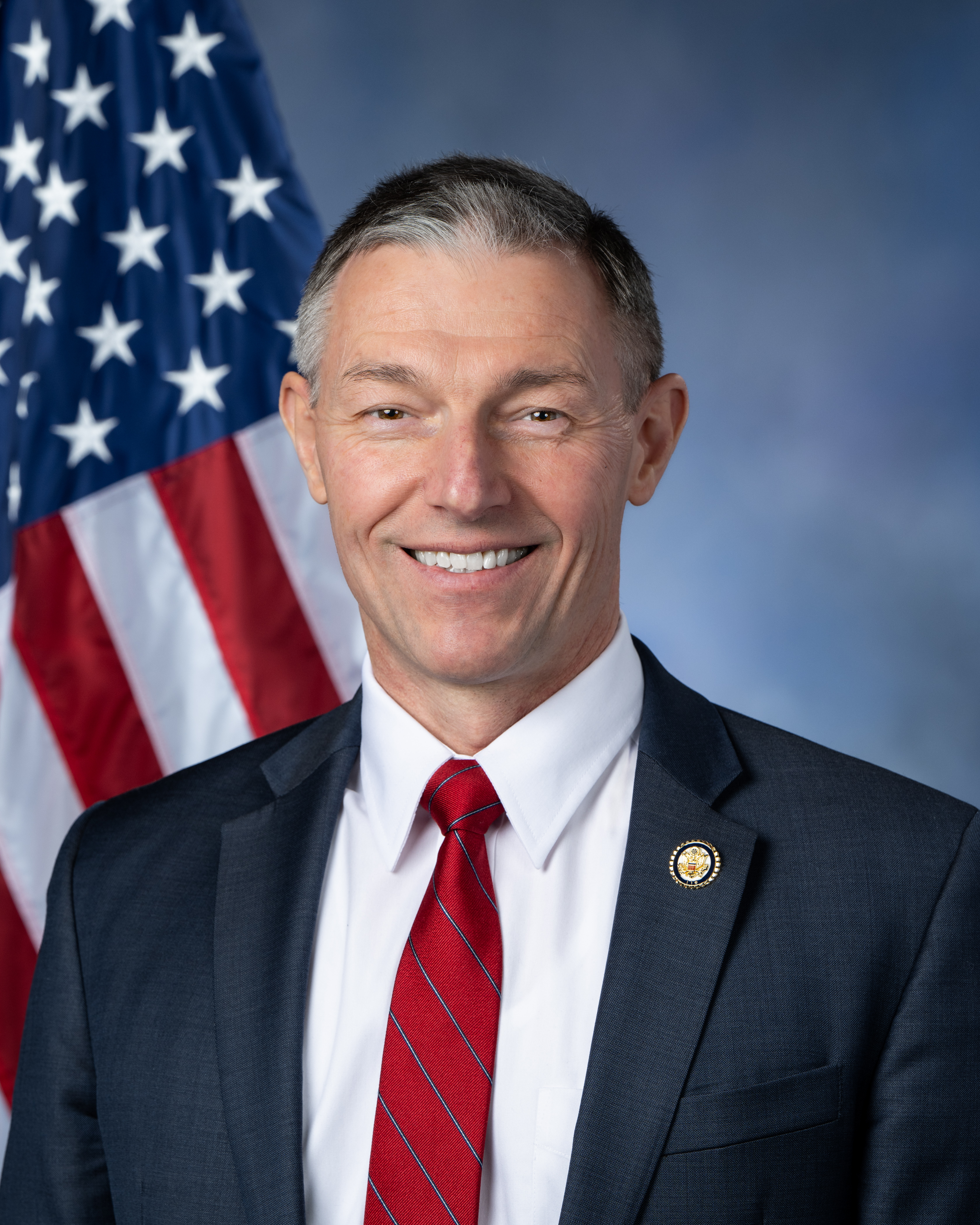
Mike Kennedy

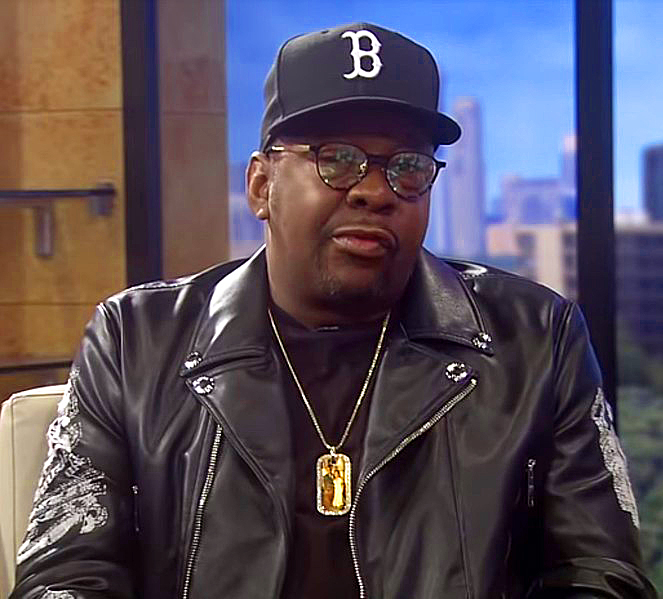
Bobby Brown

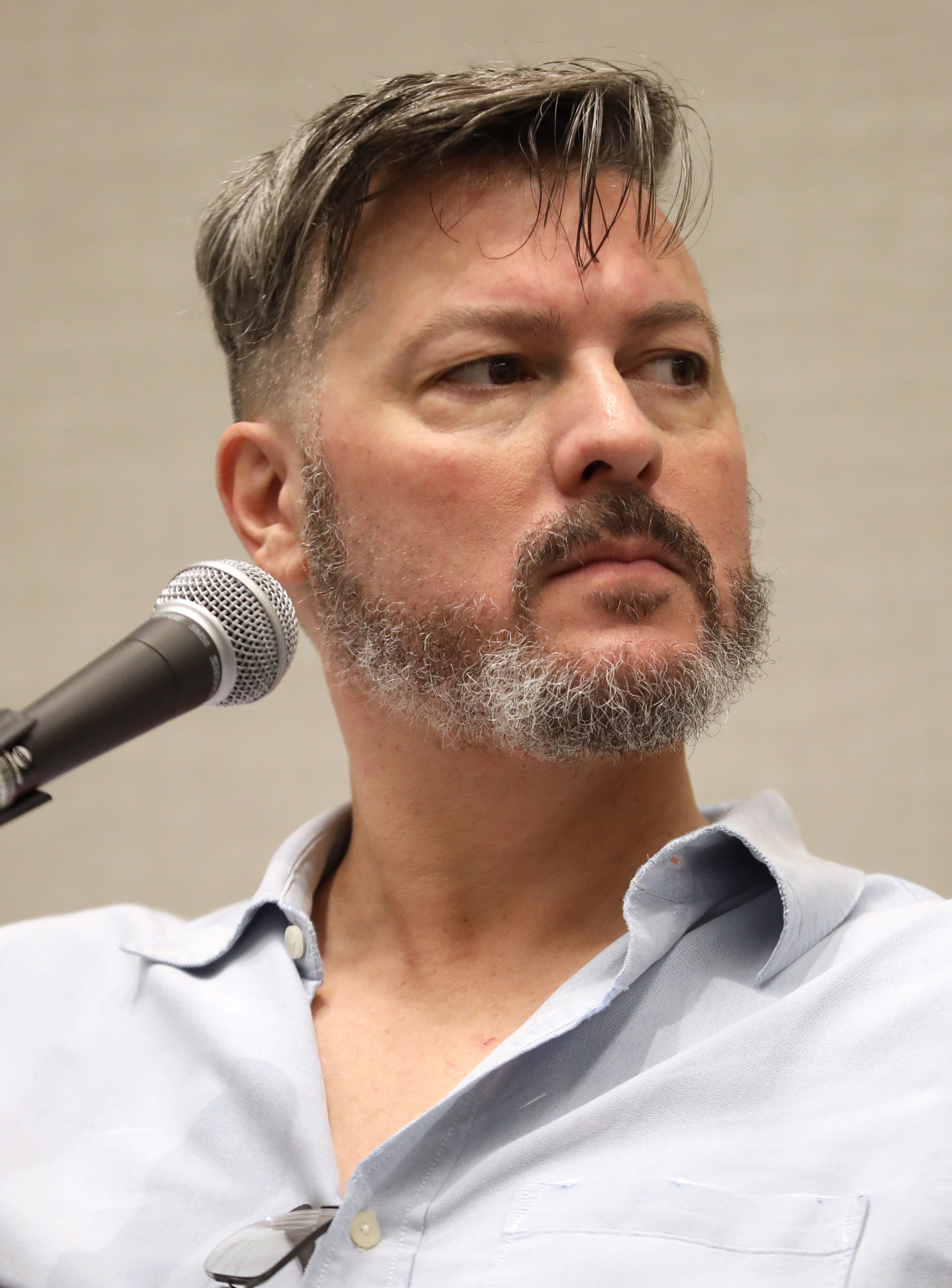
David Hayter

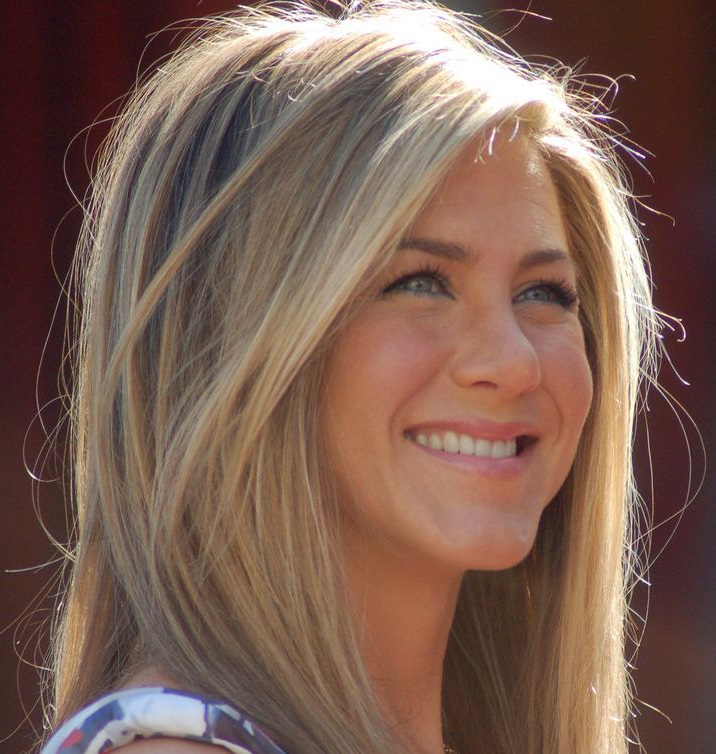
Jennifer Aniston

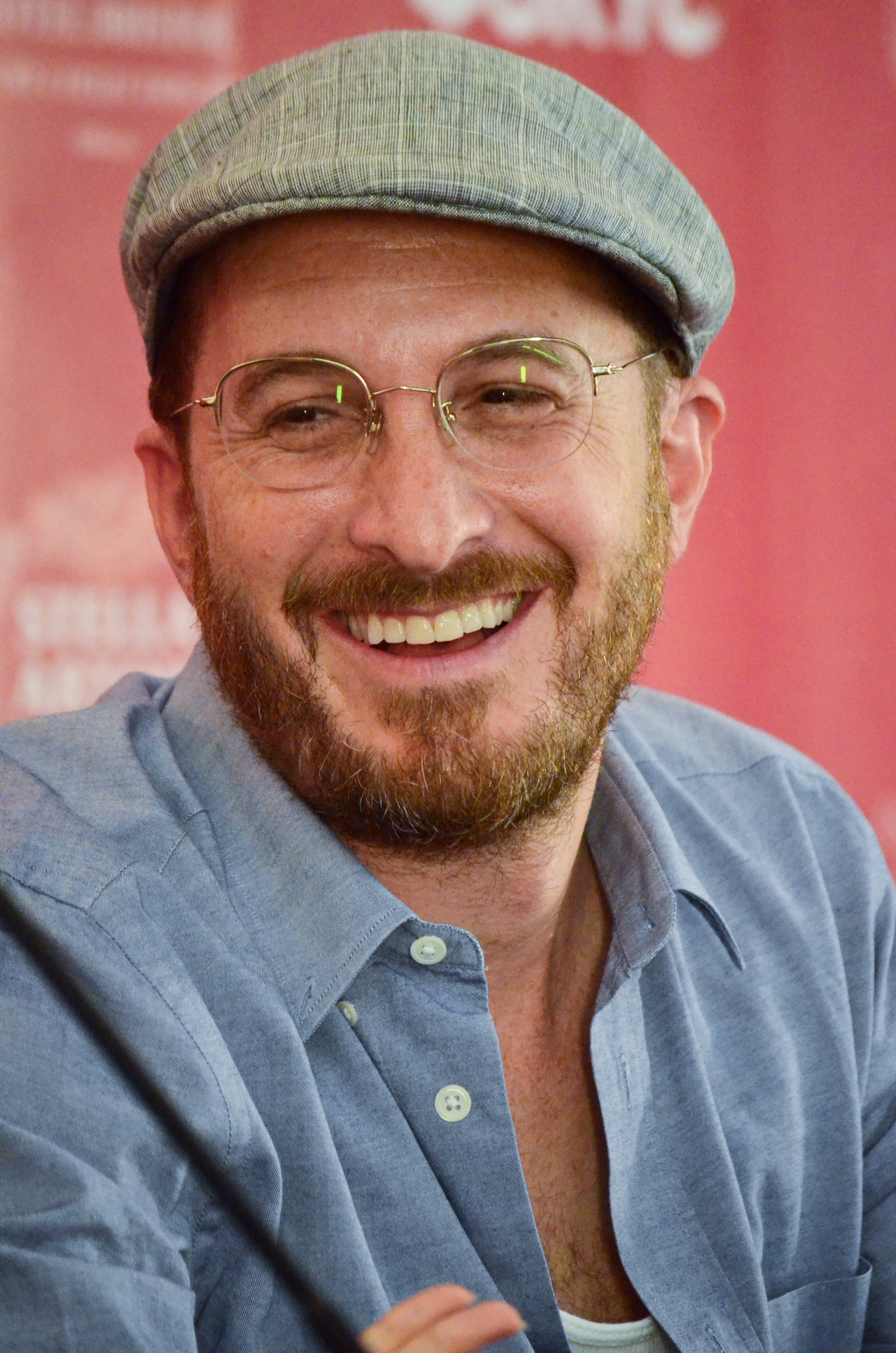
Darren Aronofsky

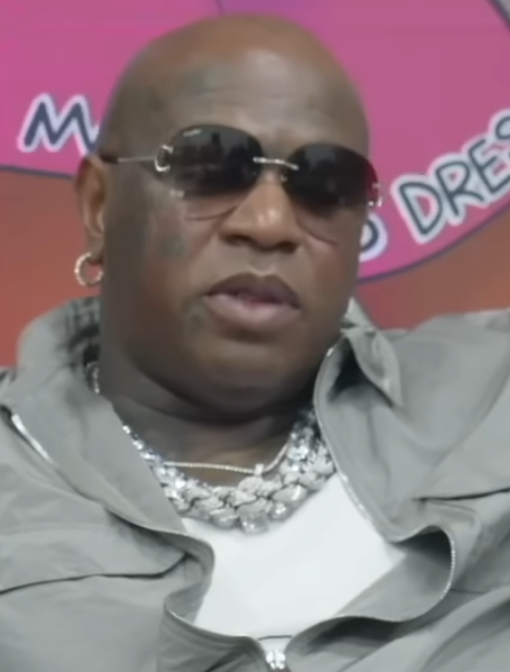
Birdman

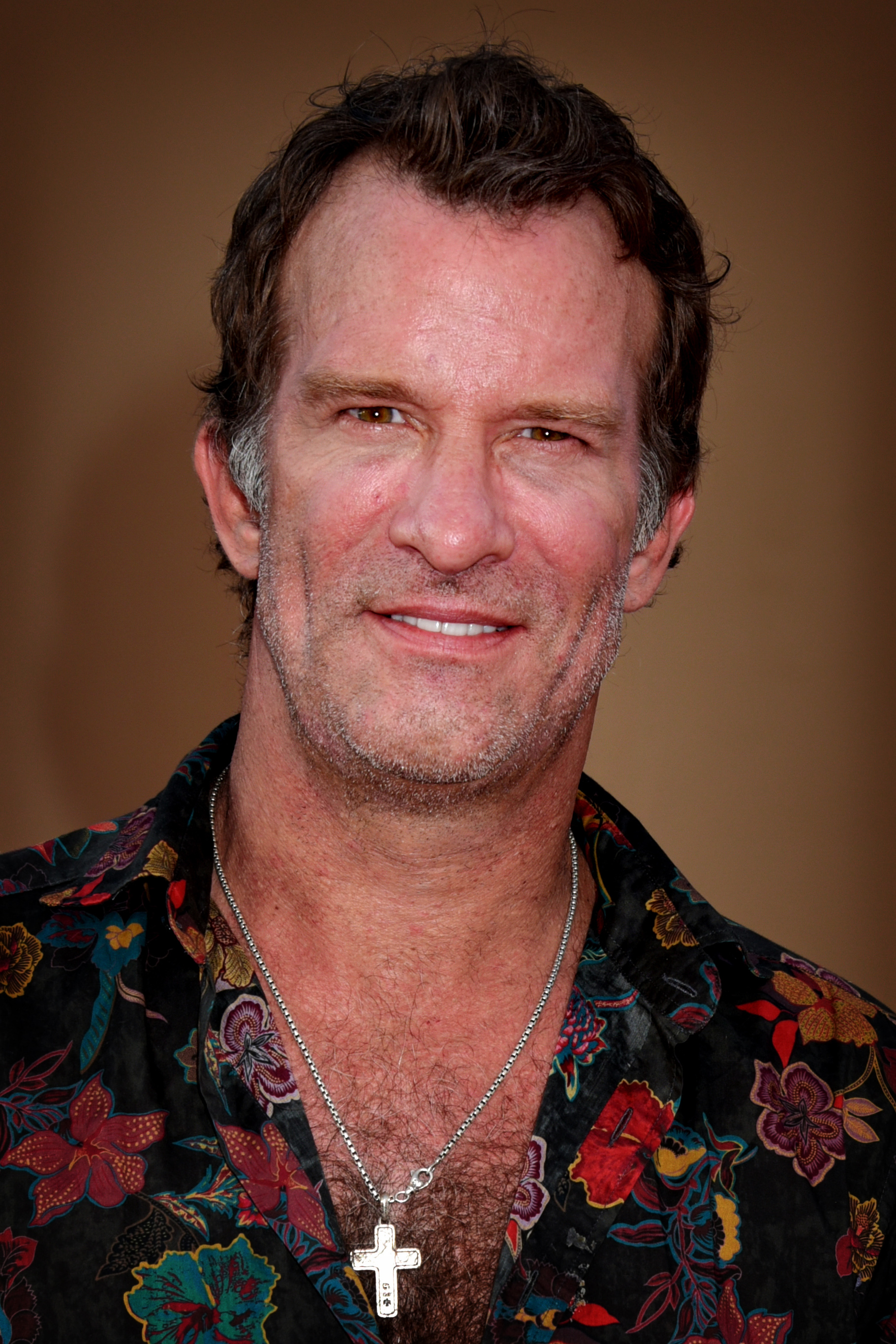
Thomas Jane

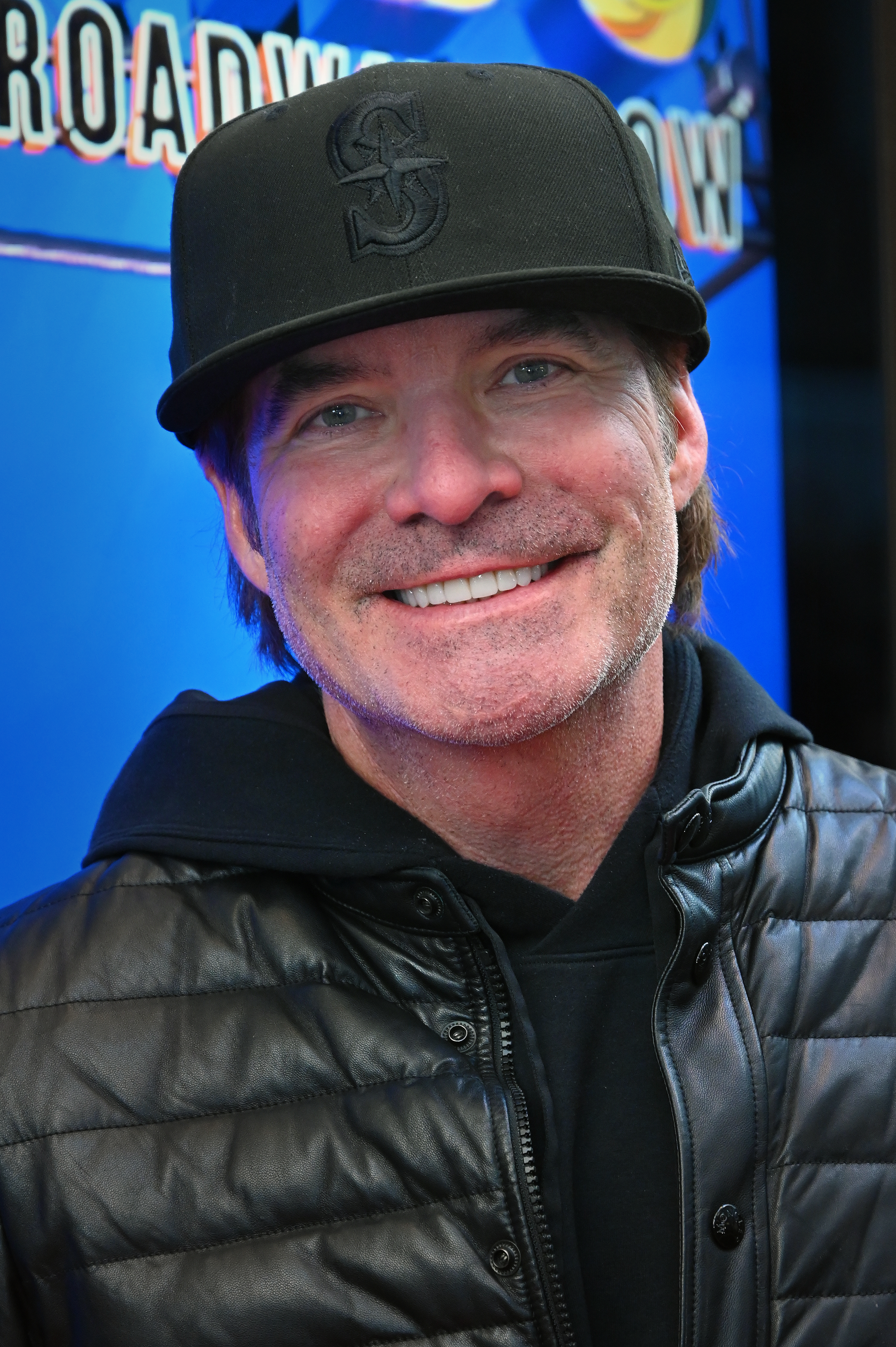
Pat Monahan

- February 1
  - Gerard Benderoth, law enforcement officer and strongman (d. 2017)
  - Andrew Breitbart, journalist, author, and publisher (d. 2012)
  - Walter Bond, basketball player
  - Brian Krause, actor and screenwriter
  - Patrick Wilson, drummer
- February 2
  - Kelly Morrison, politician
  - Mike Kennedy, politician
- February 3
  - Paul Babeu, politician and law enforcement officer, Sheriff of Pinal County, Arizona (2009-2017)
  - Richard Barron, basketball player and coach
  - Beau Biden, attorney and politician, son of President Joe Biden (d. 2015)
  - Terry Bradshaw, baseball player and coach
  - Jeff Christy, football player
- February 4
  - Craig Bjornson, baseball player
  - Beth A. Brown, NASA astrophysicist (d. 2008)
  - Joel Burns, politician
  - Brad Cornett, baseball player
  - Chris Crooms, football player
- February 5
  - Bobby Brown, singer
  - Wendy Burch, journalist
  - Sean Connors, politician
  - Mike Constantino, soccer player
- February 6
  - John Bauer, Olympic cross-country skier
  - James C. Brau, economist
  - David Hayter, Canadian-born actor, voice actor, screenwriter, director, and producer
- February 7 – Chris Creighton, football player and coach
- February 8 – Jeff Campbell, politician
- February 9
  - Clark Brisson, soccer player
  - Ian Eagle, sports announcer
  - Tom Scharpling, comedian, television writer, and producer
- February 10
  - Rachel Blumberg, drummer for the Decemberists
  - Andrew Brooks, immunologist, academic, and businessman (d. 2021)
- February 11
  - Jennifer Aniston, actress, director, and producer
  - Bill Warner, motorcycle racer and world motorcycle land speed record holder (d. 2013)
- February 12 – Darren Aronofsky, filmmaker
- February 13
  - Fernando Bermudez, person wrongfully convicted of murder
  - Kelly Blackwell, football player
  - Andrew Bryniarski, actor and bodybuilder
  - Carl Chang, entrepreneur, real estate investor, business executive, tennis coach, and founder of Pieology
  - Jerry Costello II, politician
  - Joyce DiDonato, opera singer
  - Bryan Thomas Schmidt, science fiction author and editor
- February 14
  - Tony D. Bauernfeind, Air Force Lieutenant General
  - Cait Brennan, singer/songwriter, record producer, and screenwriter
  - Harry Colon, football player
- February 15
  - Edgar Bennett, football player and coach
  - Birdman, rapper, entertainer, and record producer
  - Sam Bozzo, director and author
  - DeAnna Burt, Space Force Lieutenant General
- February 16
  - John Cooper, basketball player and coach
  - Tim Costo, baseball player
- February 18 – Paula Berry, Olympic javelin thrower
- February 19
  - Burton C. Bell, rock vocalist/lyricist, frontman for Fear Factory (1989-2020) and Ascension of the Watchers
  - Rick Barot, poet and educator
  - Ray Canterbury, politician
  - Candi Carter, broadcast executive
- February 20
  - Jos Bergman, rugby player
  - Jason Blum, producer, founder and CEO of Blumhouse Productions
- February 21
  - Michael Cusick, politician
  - Tony Meola, soccer player
- February 22
  - Christopher Buehlman, novelist, comedian, playwright, and poet
  - Mark Chmura, football player
  - Cynthia Cloud, politician
  - Thomas Jane, actor and comic books producer
  - Clinton Kelly, fashion consultant and television host
- February 23
  - Frank Charles, baseball player
  - Gail Curley, Army Colonel and Marshal of the United States Supreme Court
- February 24 – Roy Barker, football player
- February 25 – Jeffrey Trail, naval lieutenant and Gulf War veteran (d. 1997)
- February 27
  - Willie Banks, baseball player
  - Luke Messer, politician
- February 28
  - Tara Calico, kidnapping victim (missing since 1988)
  - Robert Sean Leonard, actor
  - Pat Monahan, singer and frontman for Train

=== March ===
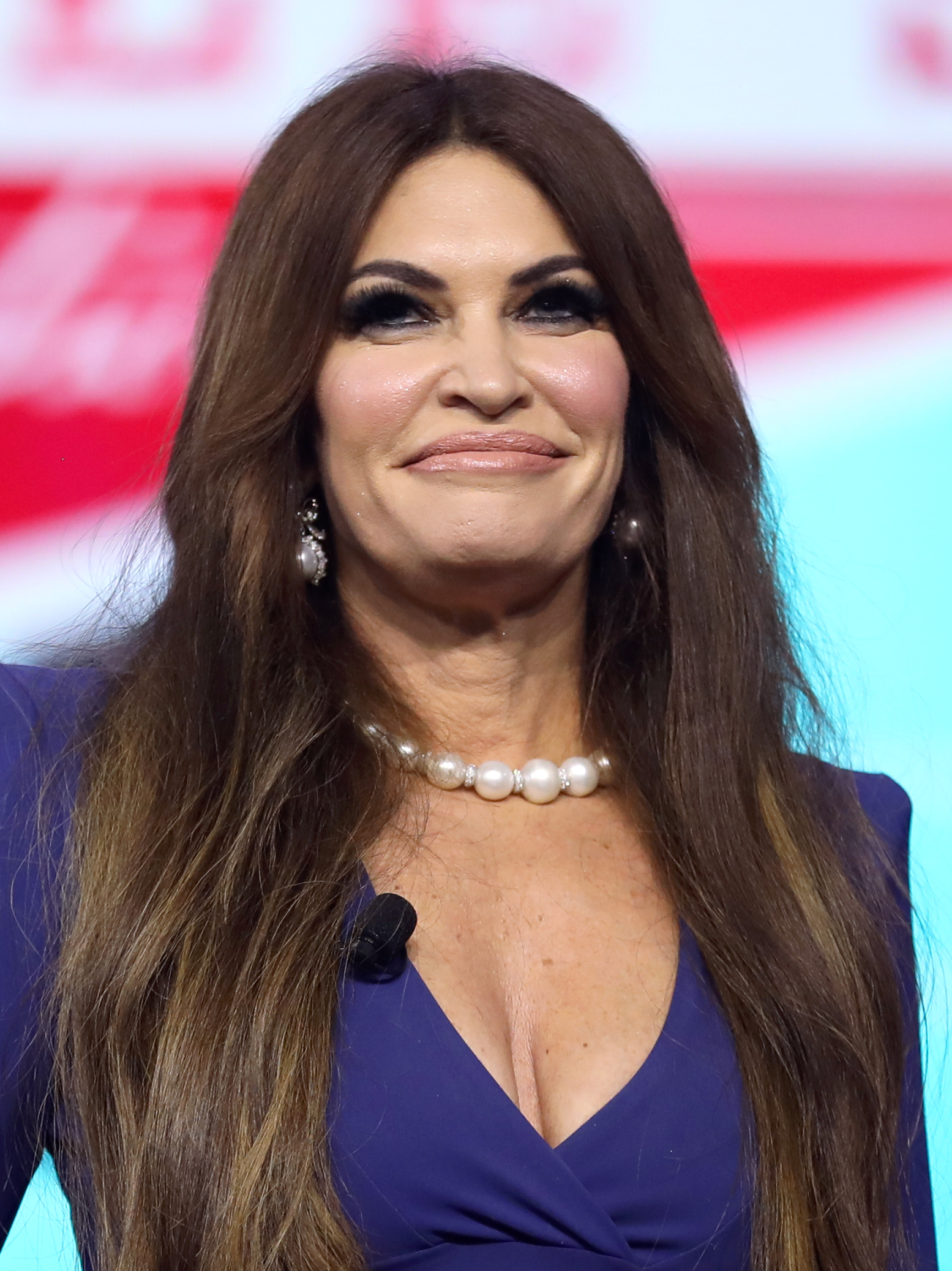
Kimberly Guilfoyle

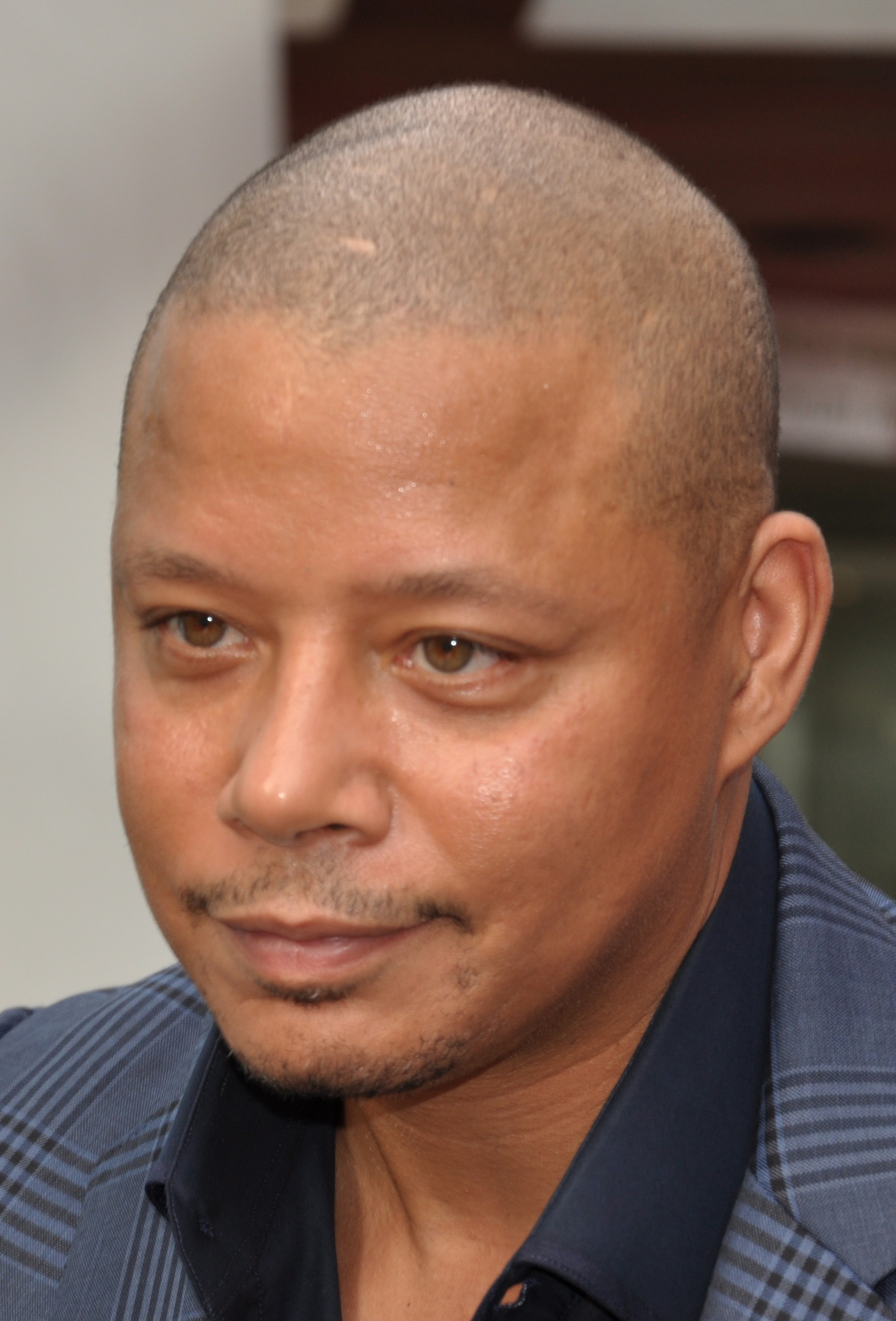
Terrence Howard

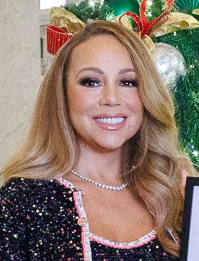
Mariah Carey

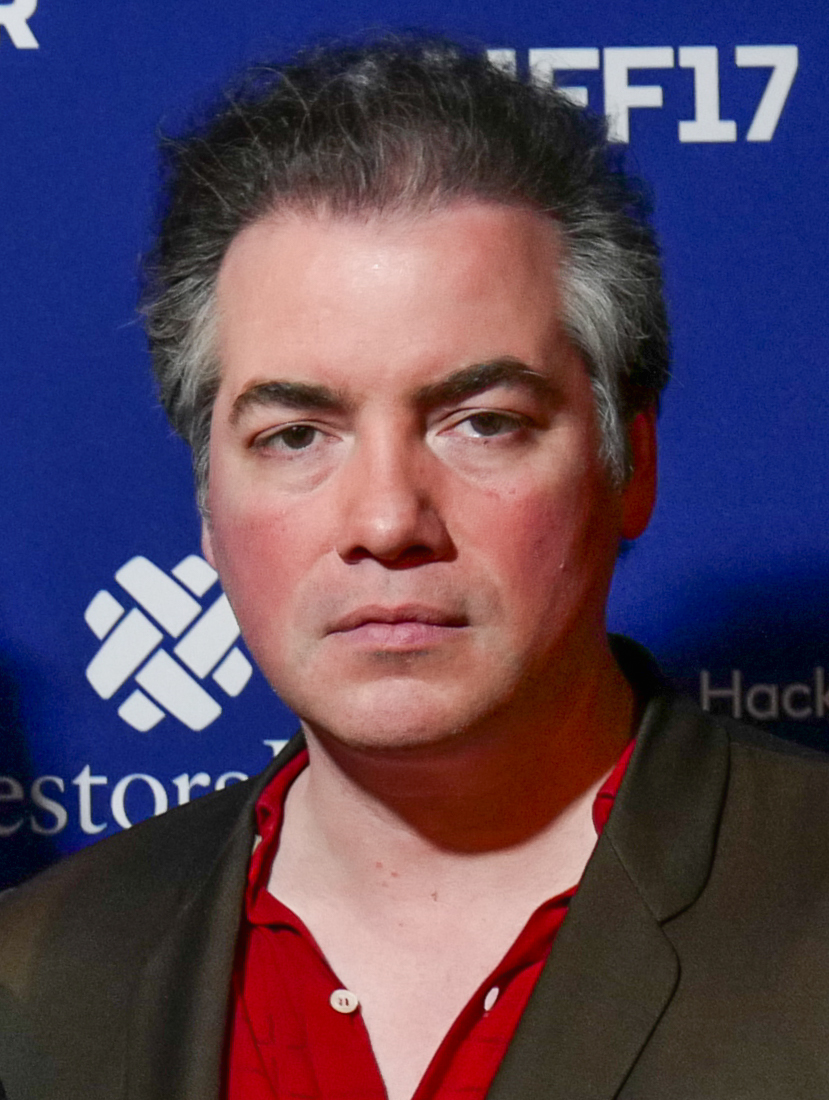
Kevin Corrigan

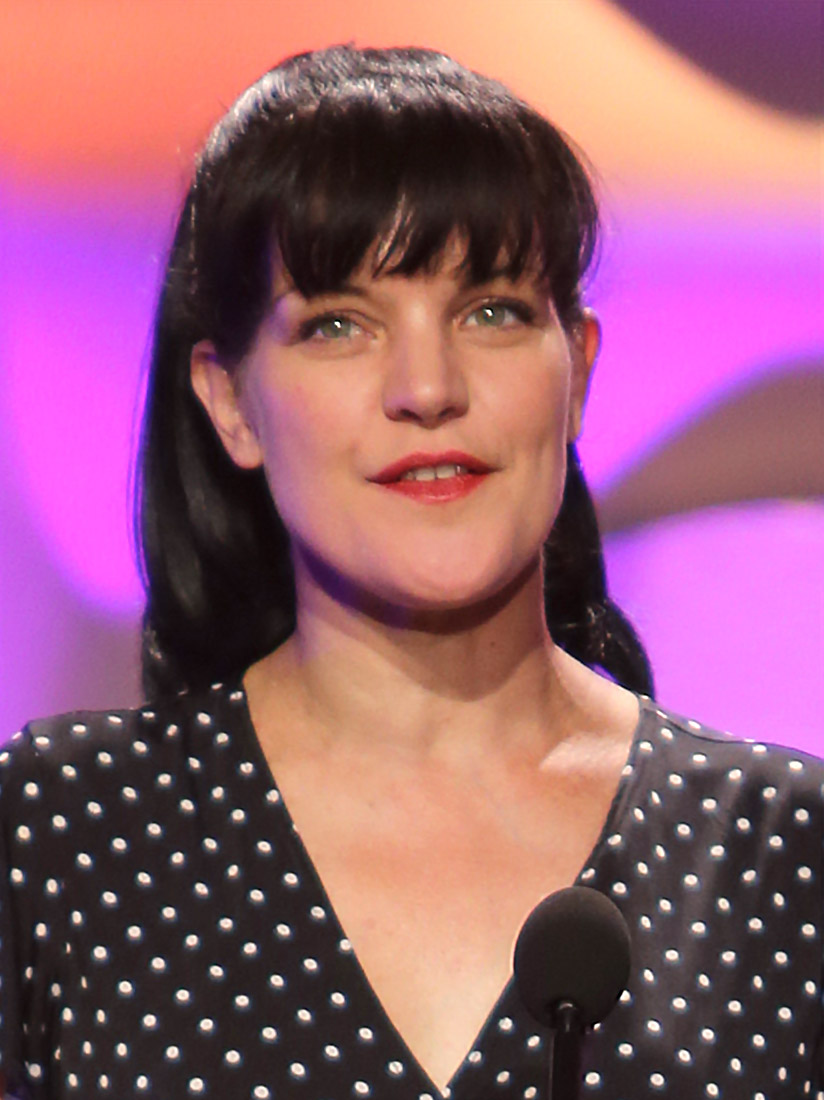
Pauley Perrette

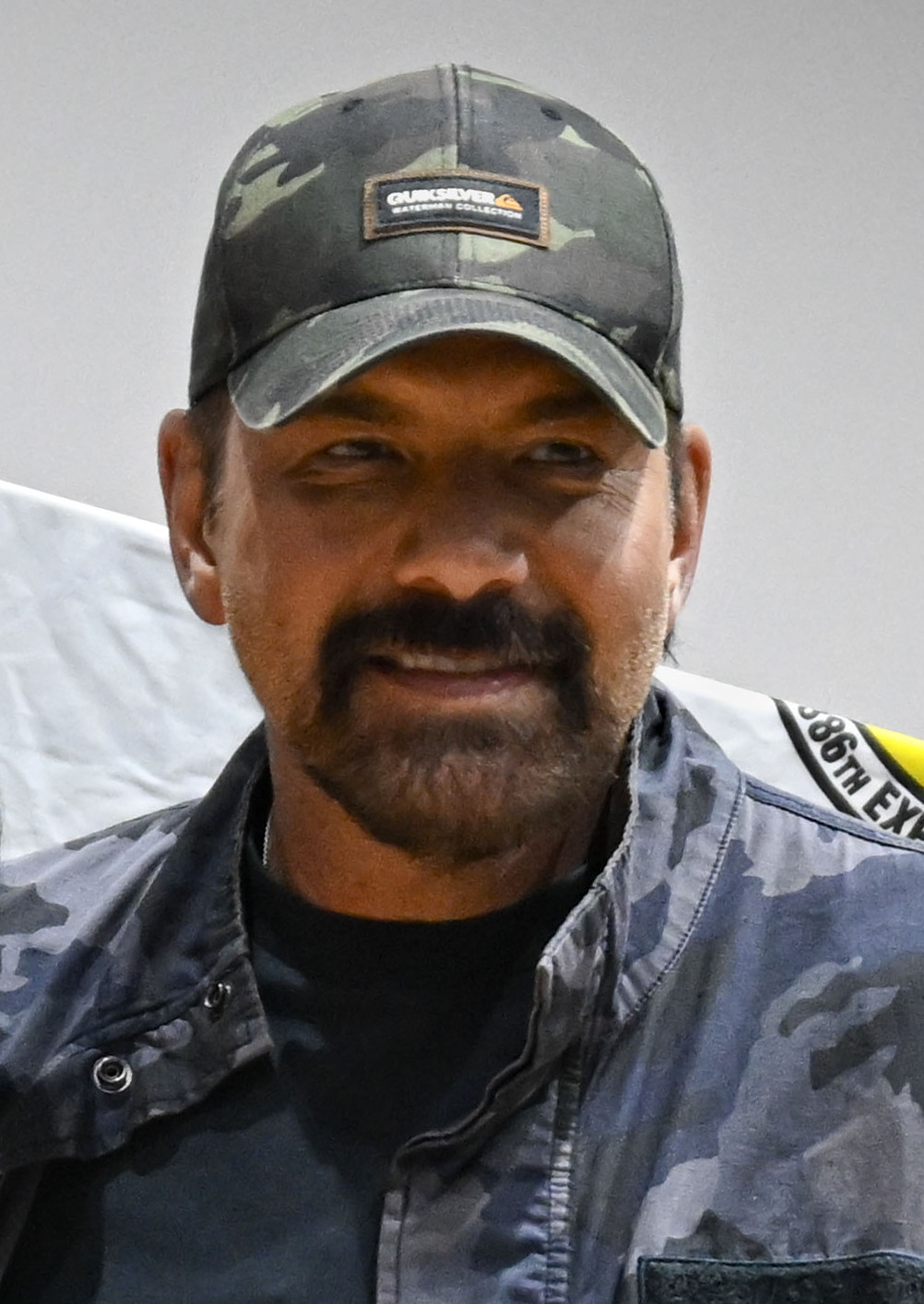
Rodney Atkins

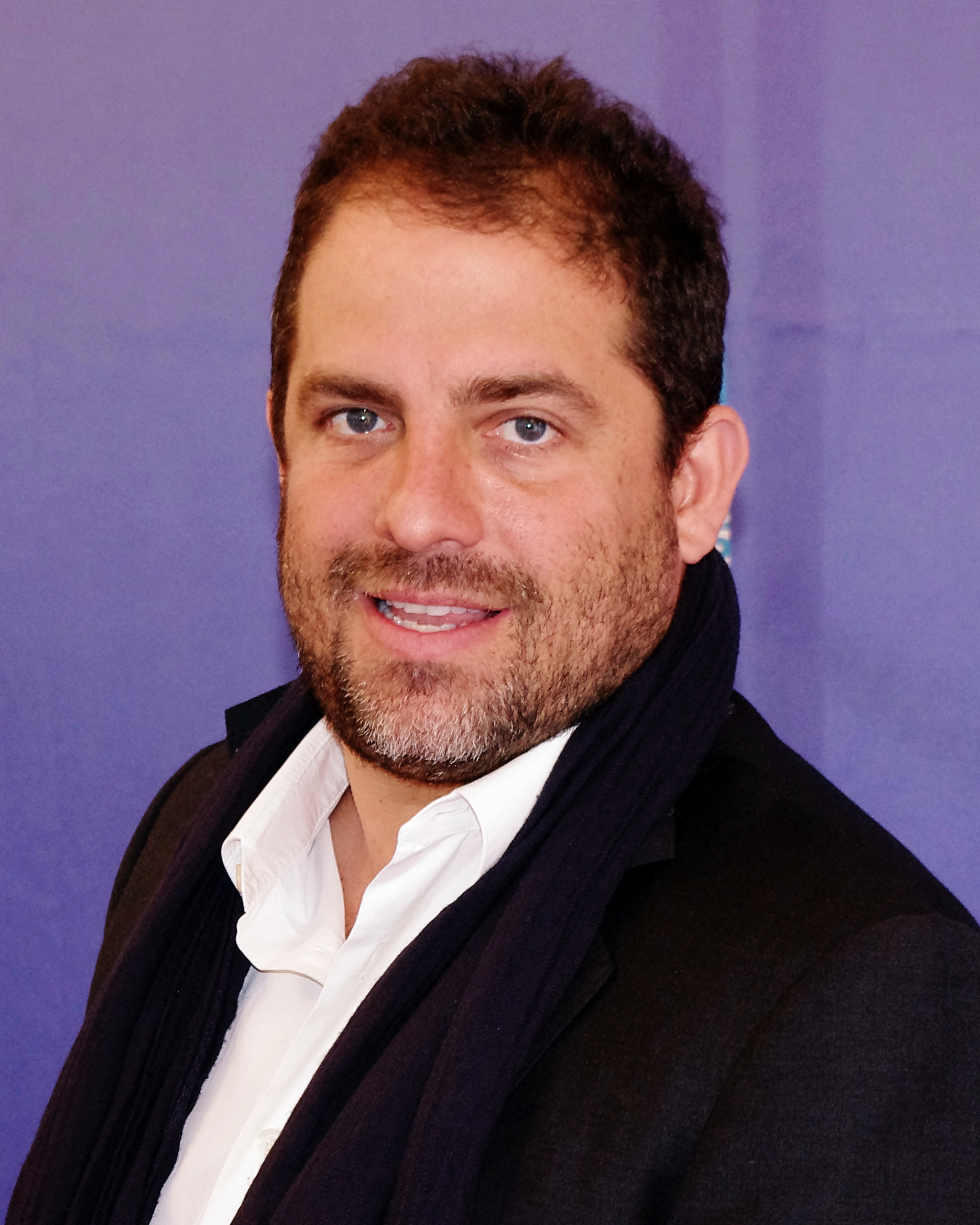
Brett Ratner

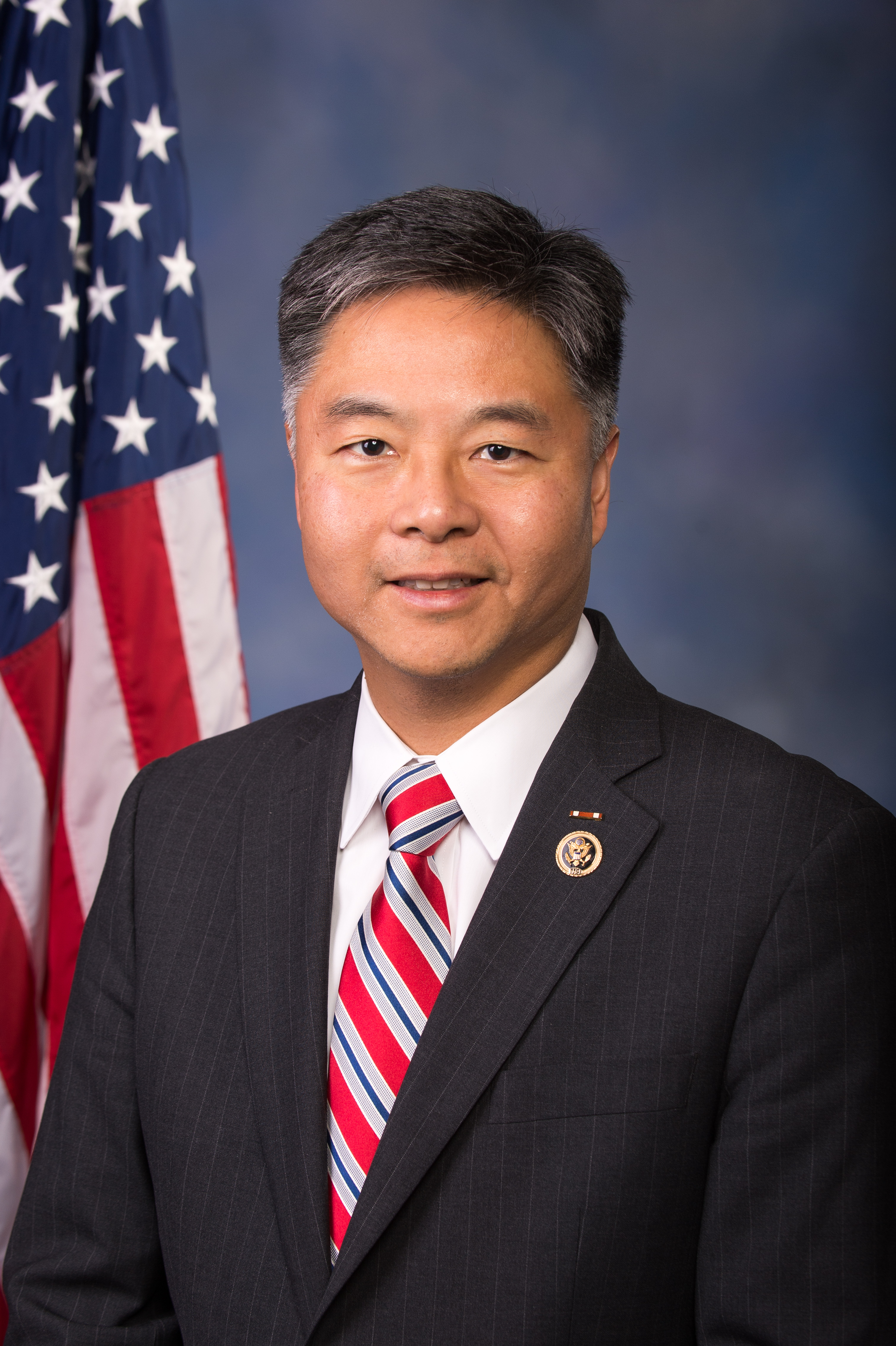
Ted Lieu

- March 1
  - Lori Brown, architect
  - Doug Creek, baseball player (d. 2024)
- March 3
  - Johnny Bacolas, bassist for Alice in Chains
  - Kerry Bascom, basketball player
- March 4
  - Chaz Bono, child actor and LGBT rights activist
  - Thomas McDermott Jr., politician, 20th mayor of Hammond, Indiana (2004-present)
  - Adrian Wojnarowski, sports columnist and reporter
- March 5 – Kelley Moore, American television personality, event planner and author
- March 7
  - Matt Blundin, football player
  - Todd Williams, long-distance runner
- March 8 – Rich Berra, radio host and guitarist
- March 9 – Kimberly Guilfoyle, lawyer and news personality
- March 10
  - Paget Brewster, screen actress and voice artist
  - Jonathan S. Bush, technology entrepreneur
  - Kokane, rapper
- March 11
  - Voddie Baucham, University professor, pastor, and author (d. 2025)
  - Terrence Howard, actor and singer
  - Michael Rulli, politician
- March 12
  - Guymon Casady, media executive, producer, and talent manager
  - Eric Christensen, visual effects supervisor
  - Jake Tapper, journalist
- March 13 – Kevin Samuels, internet personality (d. 2022)
- March 14
  - Rob Baxley, football player
  - Greg Biekert, football player and coach
  - Michael Bland, musician and drummer
  - Mary Cheney, lawyer and daughter of Dick Cheney
  - Larry Johnson, basketball player
- March 15
  - Laurie Berkner, singer and musician
  - Kim Raver, actress
- March 16 – Judah Friedlander, actor and comedian
- March 17
  - Scott Brow, baseball player
  - Garret Chachere, football player and coach
  - Mark D'Onofrio, football player and coach
- March 18 – Michael Bergin, actor and real estate agent
- March 19
  - Kevin Blatt, fixer and podcaster
  - Kevin Shinick, actor, writer, producer, and director
  - Connor Trinneer, actor
- March 20
  - André Bauer, businessman and politician, 87th Lieutenant Governor of South Carolina (2003-2011)
  - Elliot M. Bour, director and animator
  - Kelly Conlon, bassist
- March 22
  - Markus Brunnermeier, German-born University professor
  - Anthony Cannella, politician
  - Tony Fadell, engineer, inventor, designer, and entrepreneur
- March 23 – Roy Lee, producer
- March 24
  - Jason Chandler, singer and frontman for the Frustrators
  - Todd Claus, baseball coach, scout, and manager
- March 27
  - Tom E. Beer, football player
  - Mariah Carey, singer/songwriter, record producer, and actress
  - Kevin Corrigan, actor
  - Pauley Perrette, actress
- March 28
  - Rodney Atkins, country singer/songwriter
  - Jake Adelstein, journalist
  - TC Clements, politician
  - Brett Ratner, director and producer
- March 29
  - Kim Batten, Olympic sprinter
  - Jeff Blackshear, football player (d. 2019)
  - Mike Neighbors, basketball coach
  - Ted Lieu, Chinese-born politician
- March 31
  - Kevin Braunskill, sprinter
  - Peter Breinholt, musician
  - Lee Roy Chapman, public historian, citizen journalist, activist, and artist (d. 2015)

=== April ===
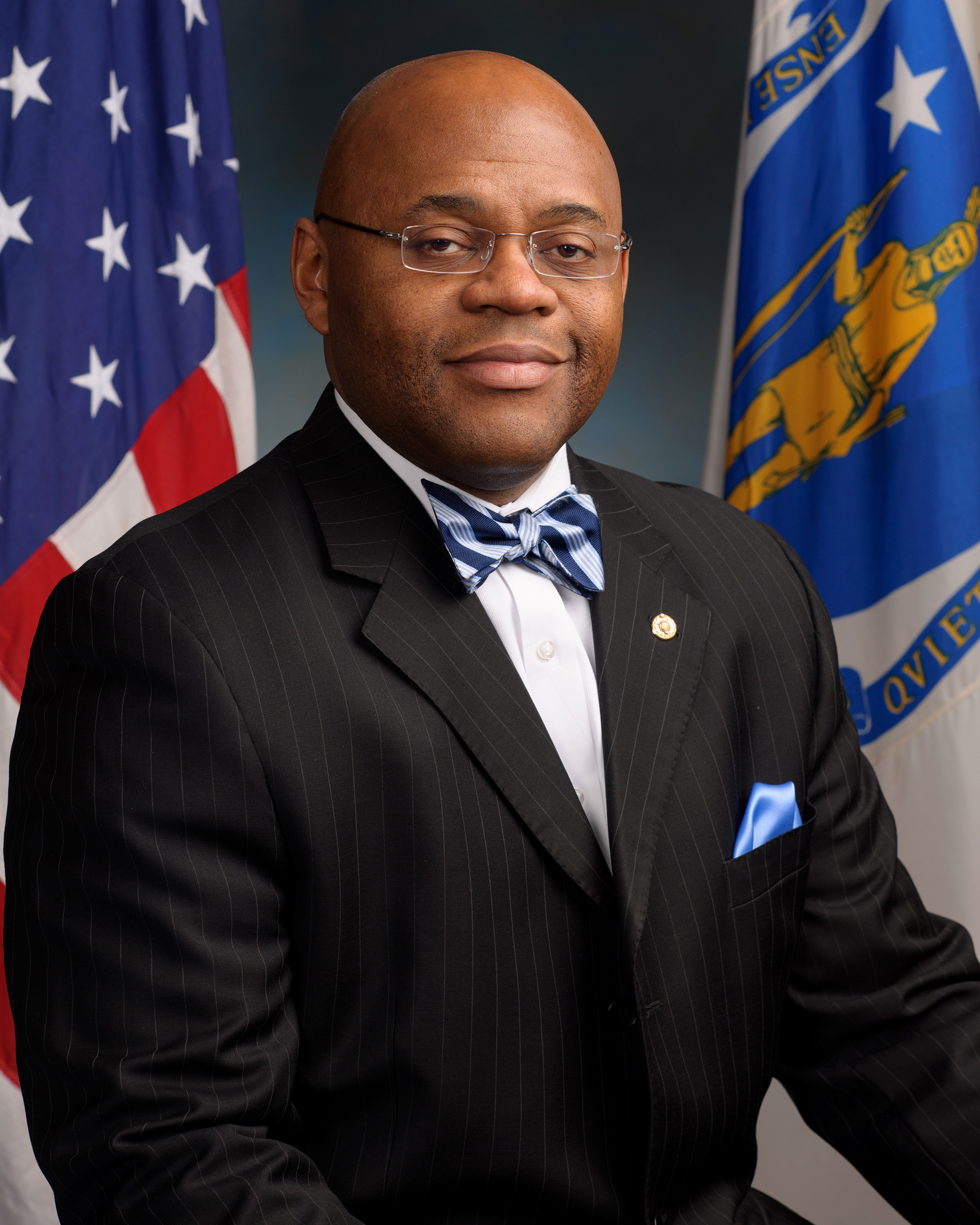
Mo Cowan

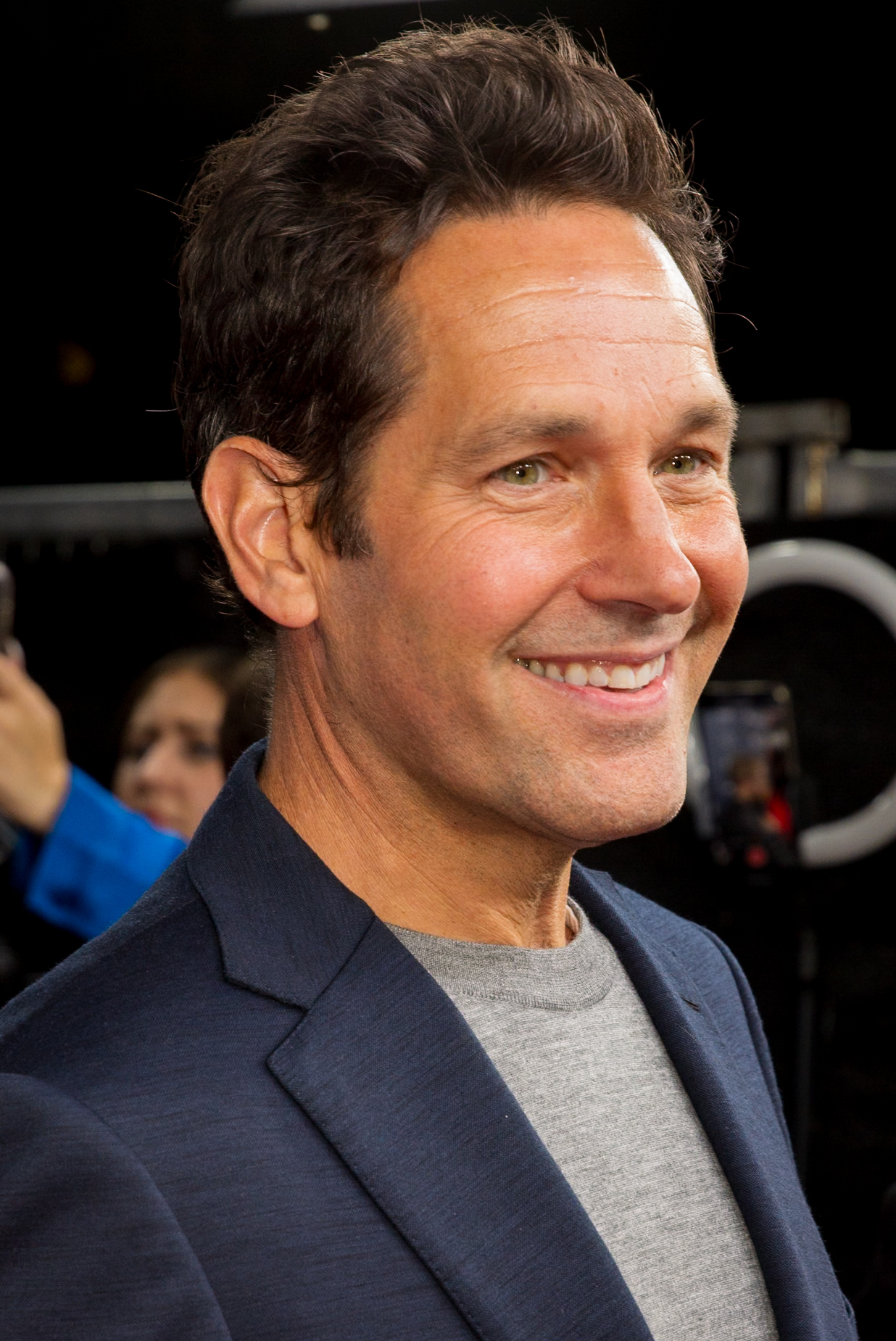
Paul Rudd

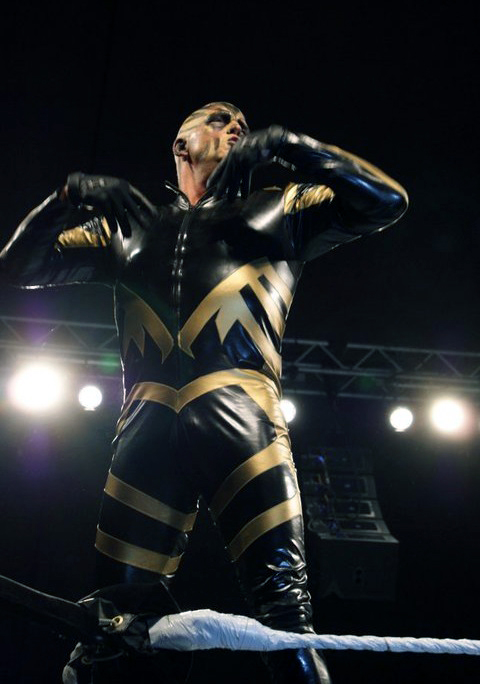
Goldust

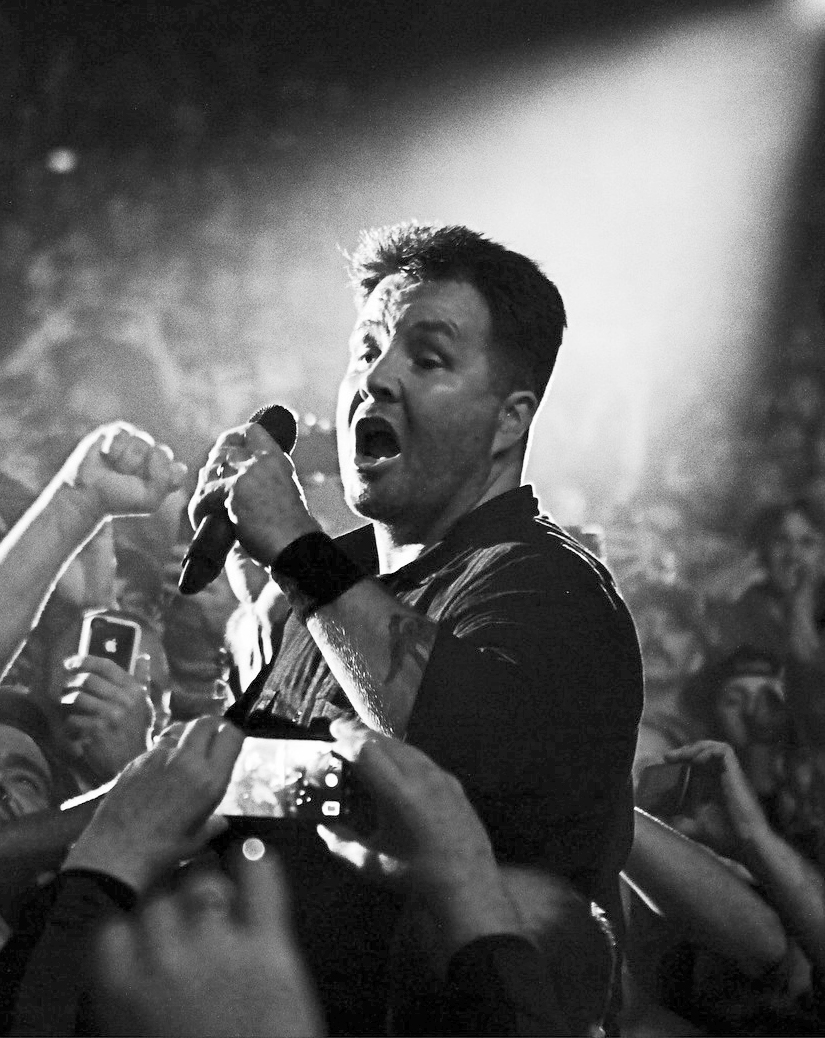
Ken Casey

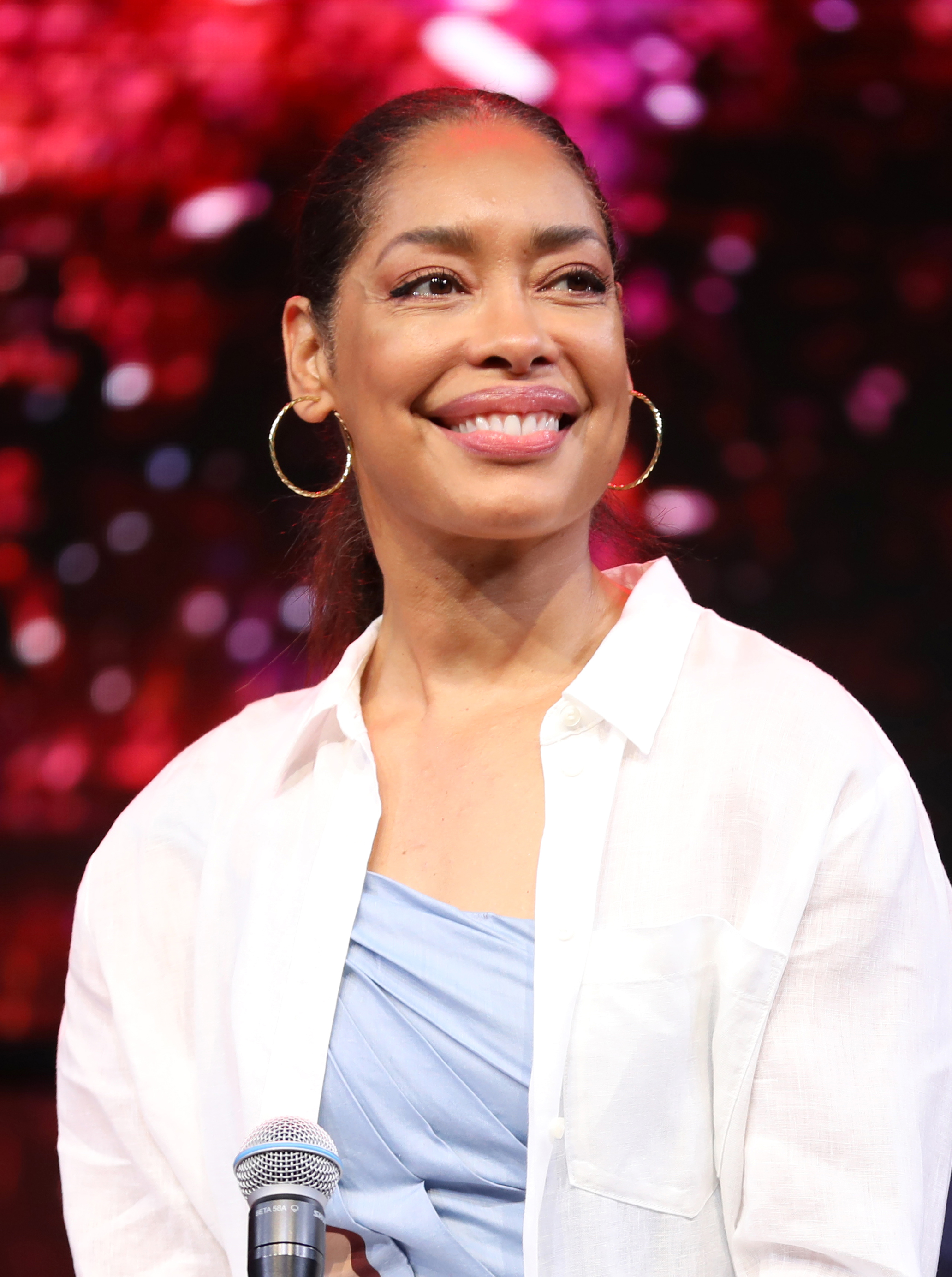
Gina Torres

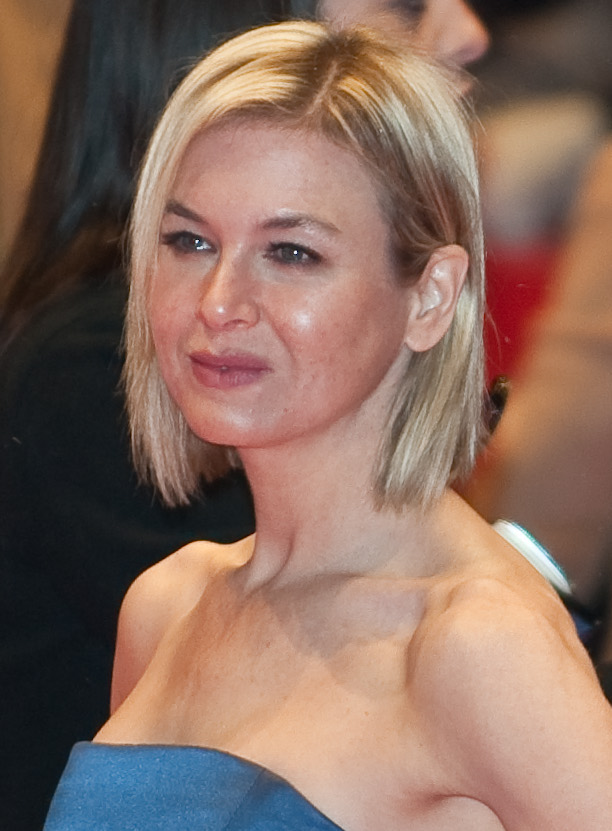
Renée Zellweger

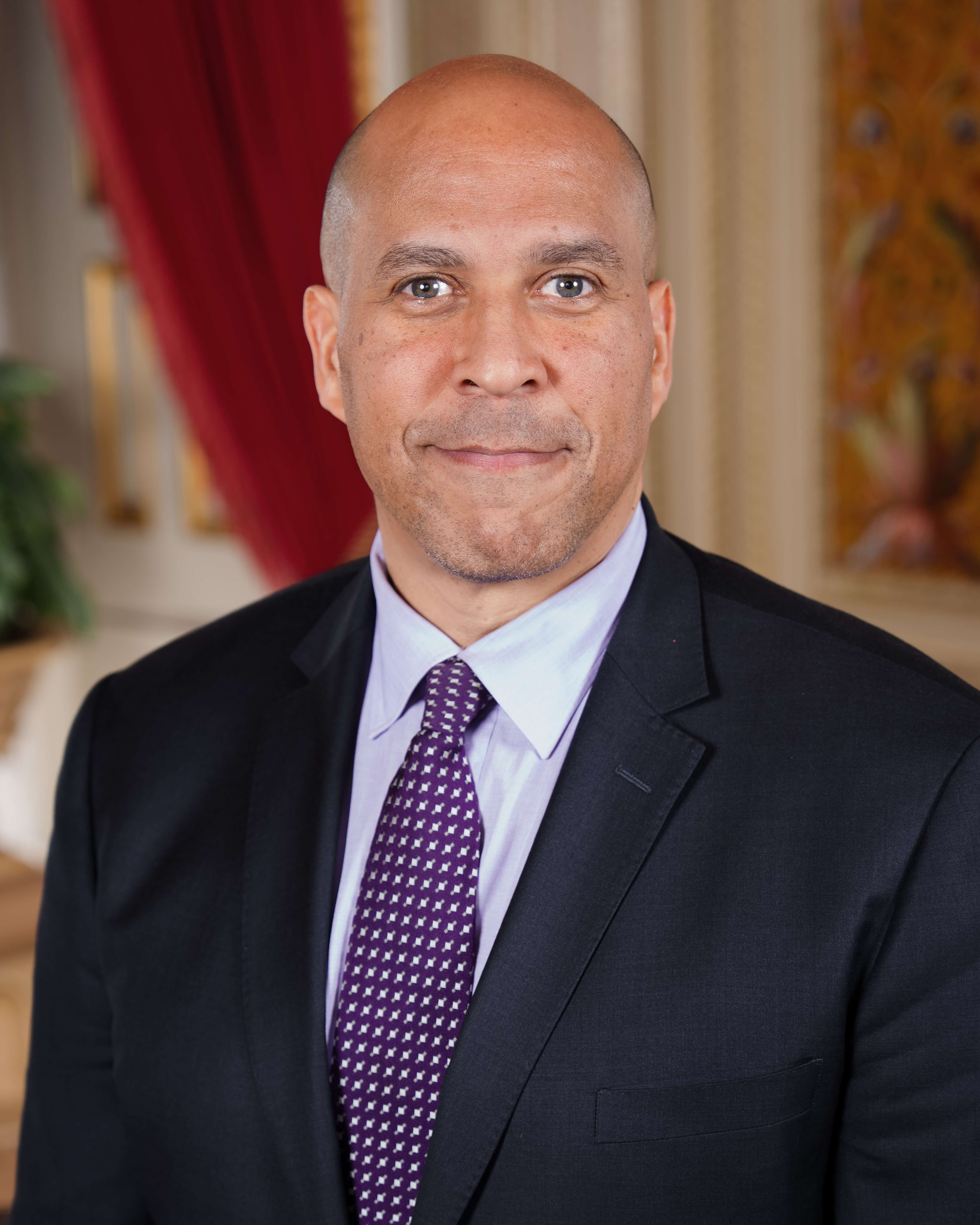
Cory Booker

- April 1
  - John M. Butler, scientist
  - Frank Castillo, baseball player (d. 2013)
- April 2 – Russ Campbell, football player
- April 4
  - Amber Boykins, politician
  - Mo Cowan, politician
- April 5 – Natalie Venetia Belcon, Trinidadian-born actress and singer
- April 6
  - Bret Boone, baseball player
  - Paul Rudd, actor, comedian, writer, and producer
- April 7 – Peggy Clasen, Olympic speed skater
- April 9
  - Wayne Benson, mandolinist and songwriter
  - Catherine Ceniza Choy, University professor
  - Debbie Schlussel, political commentator and film critic
- April 10
  - Lisa Beamer, writer
  - Danny Comden, filmmaker
  - Billy Jayne, actor
- April 11
  - Jesse Campbell, football player
  - Shane Collins, football player
  - Goldust, wrestler
- April 12 – Michael Jackson, football player (d. 2017)
- April 13
  - Josh Becker, politician
  - Corey Crowder, basketball player
- April 14 – Sade Baderinwa, journalist
- April 15
  - Jeromy Burnitz, baseball player
  - Ken Casey, singer/songwriter, frontman for Dropkick Murphys
- April 16
  - Dawn Brancheau, animal trainer (d. 2010)
  - Clyde Chambliss, politician
  - Frank J. Mrvan, politician
- April 17 – Jeff Ball, baseball player and coach
- April 18 – C. Dale Young, poet
- April 19
  - Jessica Bird, novelist
  - Jason Cameron, actor and television presenter
  - Maurice Crum Sr., football player
- April 21 – Conrad Clarks, football player
- April 22
  - Nadia Bolz-Weber, Lutheran minister, author, and theologian
  - Robert K. Coughlin, politician and real estate executive
  - Brian Cresta, politician
- April 23
  - Shannon Bird, politician
  - Geoff Diehl, politician
- April 24
  - Cecilia Bailliet, Argentinean-born University professor
  - Melinda Clarke, actress
- April 25
  - Vanessa Beecroft, Italian-born performance artist
  - Joe Buck, sportscaster
  - Michael Chippendale, politician
  - Gina Torres, actress
  - Renée Zellweger, Academy Award-winning actress and producer
- April 26
  - Geoff Boss, race car driver
  - Mortimer J. Buckley, business executive and chief executive officer of The Vanguard Group (2018-2024)
  - Kip Collins, record producer and composer (d. 2006)
  - Cindy Holscher, politician
- April 27 – Cory Booker, politician, mayor of Newark (2006-2013)
- April 28
  - Patrick Baxter, convicted serial killer
  - Merlin Bronques, musician and artist
- April 29
  - Tom Clark, sports executive
  - Alberto Cutié, Cuban-born priest
- April 30
  - Jon Bruning, politician
  - Charles Costanza, Army Lieutenant General

=== May ===
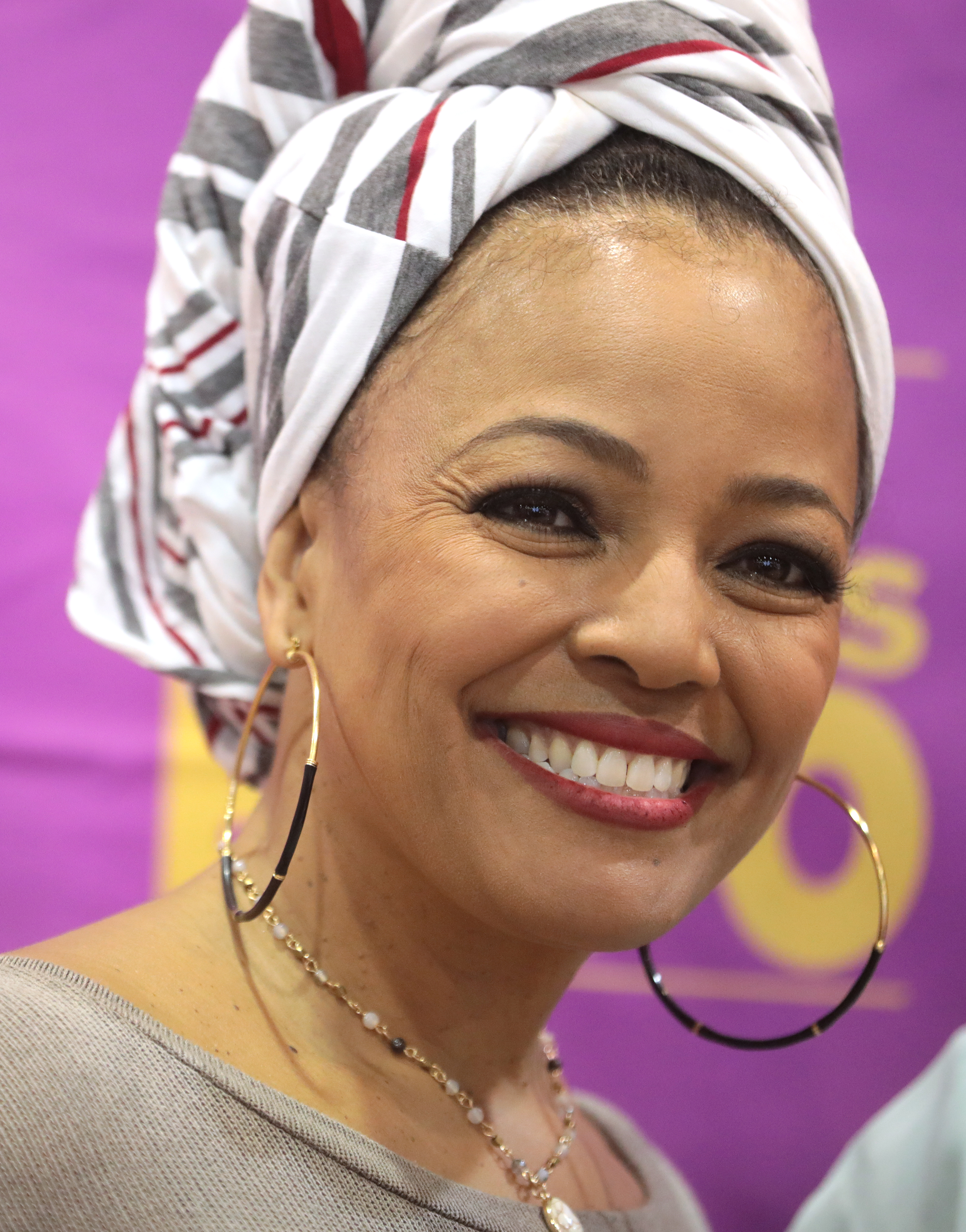
Kim Fields

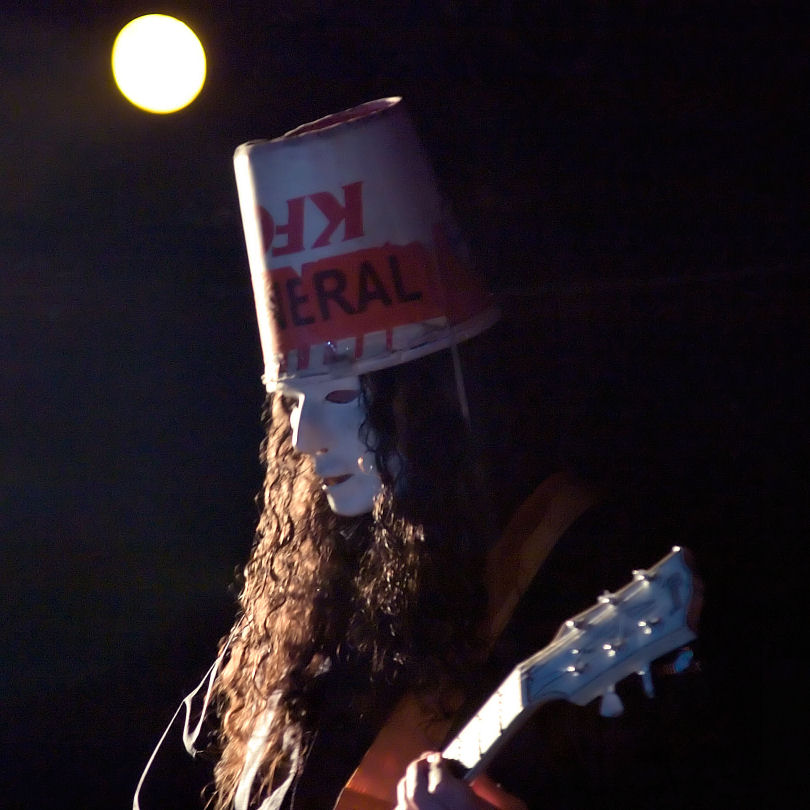
Buckethead

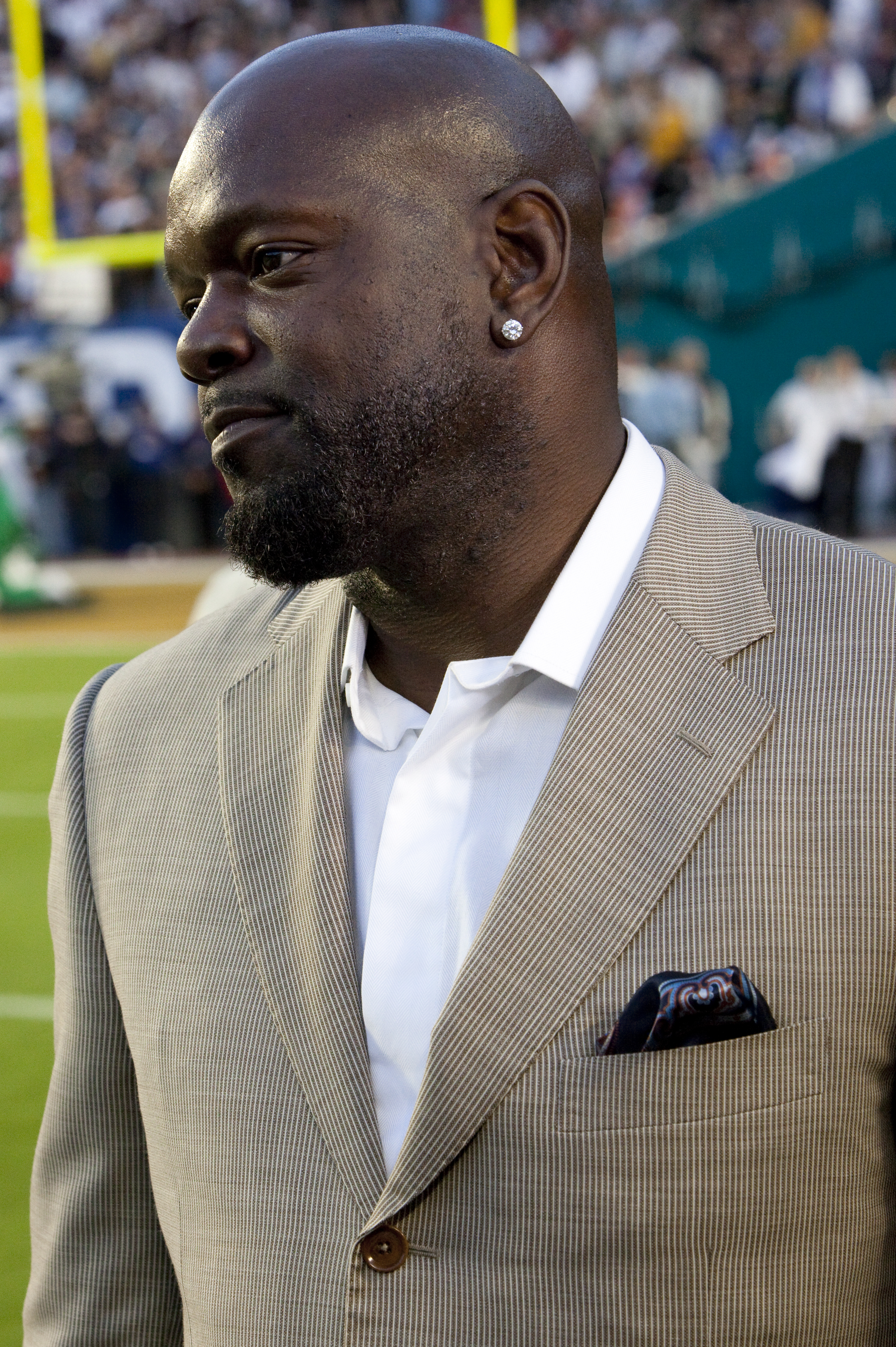
Emmitt Smith

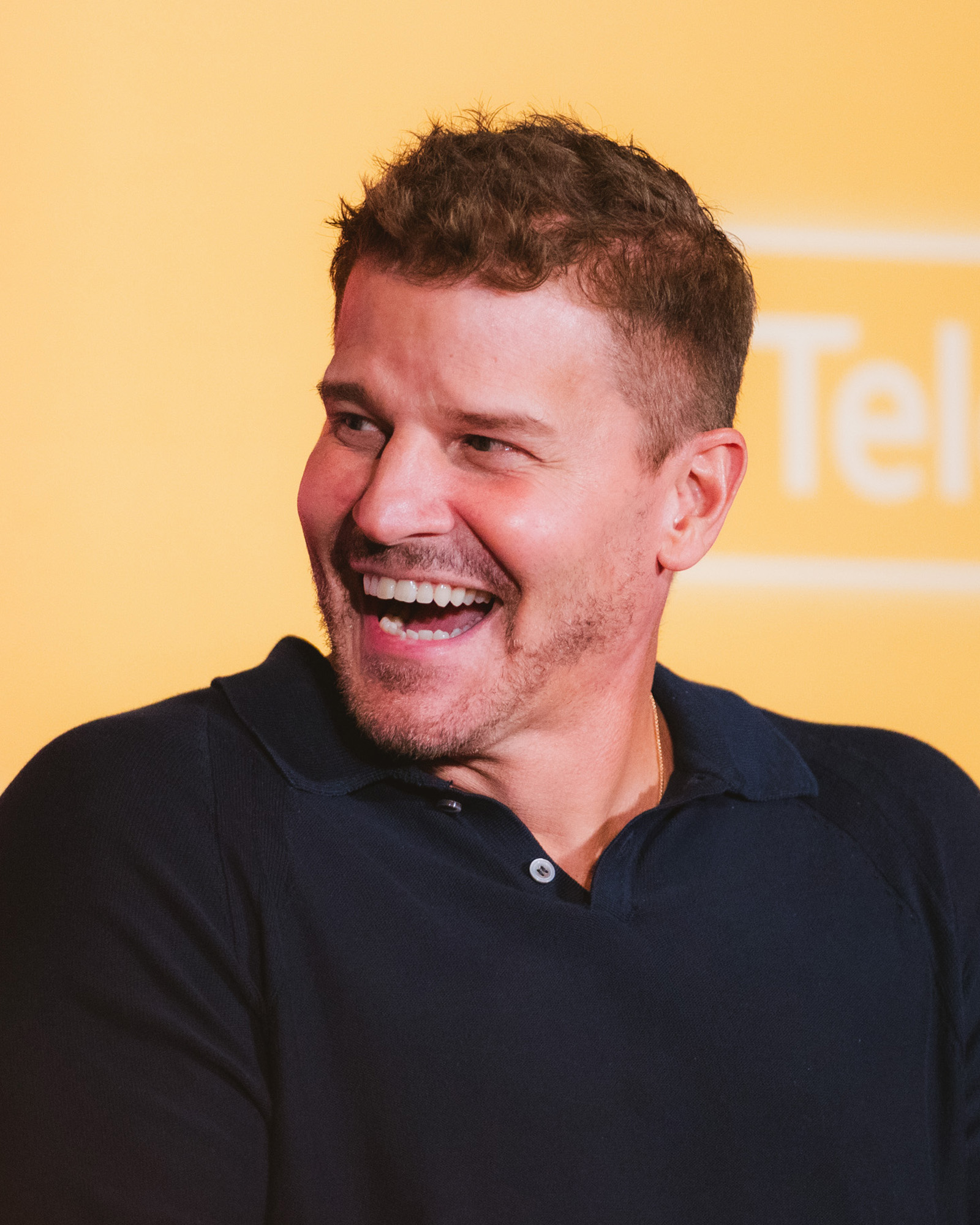
David Boreanaz

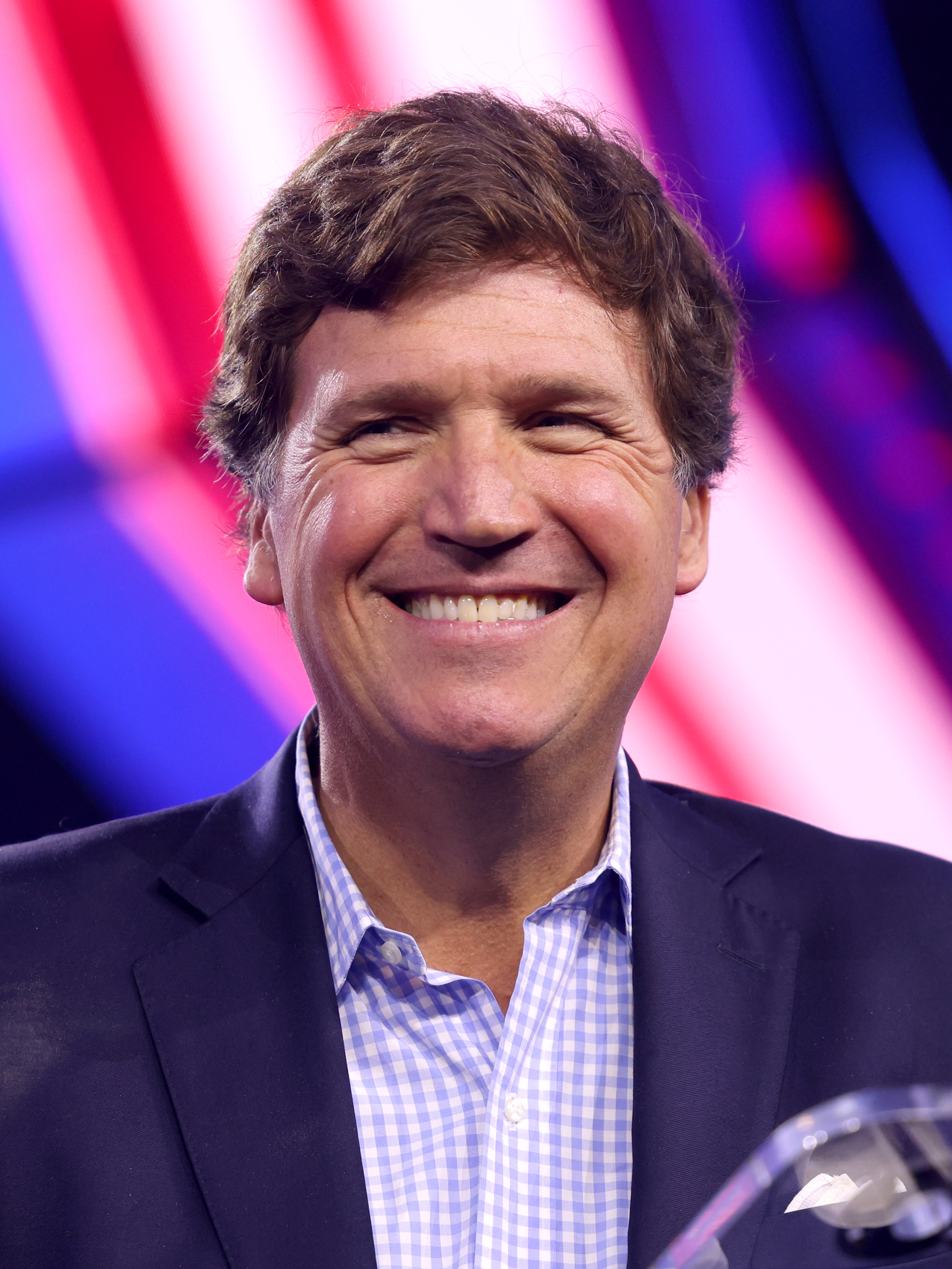
Tucker Carlson

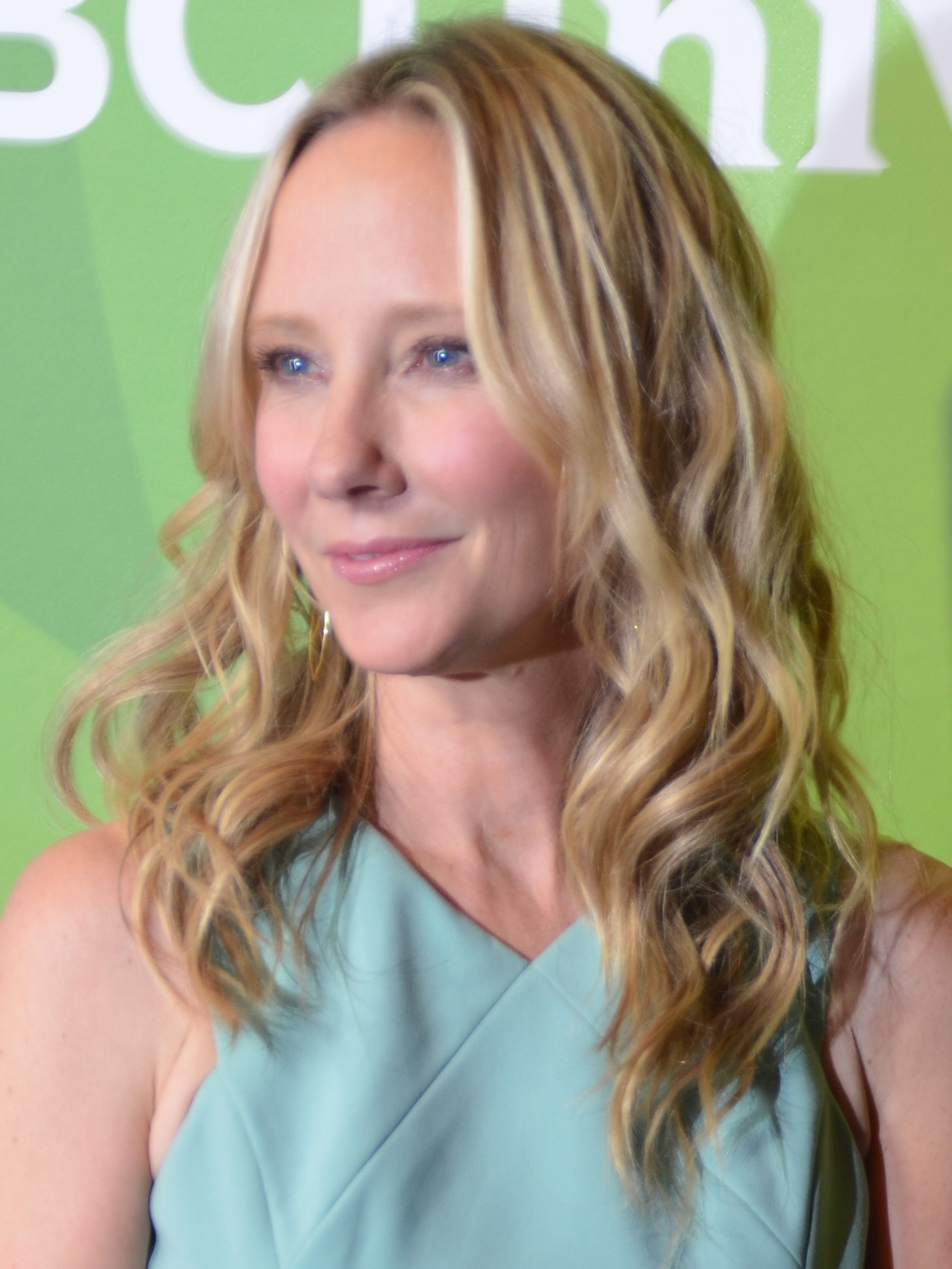
Anne Heche

- May 1 – Wes Anderson, filmmaker
- May 2 – Dick Brennan, journalist
- May 3 – Daryl F. Mallett, author and actor
- May 4
  - David Bader, University professor
  - Christina Billotte, musician
  - Michael Clark II, golfer
- May 5 – Adrian Carmack, video game artist, co-founder of id Software
- May 6
  - David Bernsley, American-born Israeli basketball player
  - John H. Brodie, theoretical physicist (d. 2006)
  - David Bulova, politician
  - Gustavo Cadile, Argentine-born fashion designer
- May 7 – Isaac Brown, basketball player and coach
- May 8
  - Richard Buchanan, football player
  - Elizabeth Campos, politician
  - Brad Culpepper, football player
- May 9 – Joe Carnahan, actor and filmmaker
- May 10 – John Cummings, baseball player
- May 12
  - Kim Fields, actress
  - Kevin Nalty, comedian and blogger
- May 13
  - Buckethead, guitarist
  - Dan Hoener, guitarist for Sunny Day Real Estate
- May 14
  - John Carluccio, filmmaker, artist, and inventor
  - Danny Wood, singer
- May 15
  - Arturo Cepeda, Mexican-born bishop
  - Russell Hornsby, actor
  - Emmitt Smith, football player
- May 16
  - Ant Banks, rapper and record producer
  - David Boreanaz, actor
  - Tucker Carlson, political commentator
  - Steve Lewis, Olympic sprinter
- May 17
  - Anjelina Belakovskaia, Ukrainian-born chess grandmaster
  - Marc Bodnick, entrepreneur, venture capitalist, and co-founder of Elevation Partners
  - Joe Born, inventor and businessman, CEO of Aiwa
  - Coby G. Brooks, businessman
  - Frances Callier, producer, writer, comedian, and actress
  - Hunkie Cooper, football player and coach
- May 20 – Mark Walker, politician
- May 21
  - Barry Cooper, drug reform activist, YouTuber, and filmmaker
  - George LeMieux, politician
- May 22
  - Carl Craig, music producer and DJ
  - Cathy McMorris Rodgers, politician
  - Michael Kelly, actor
- May 23 – David Cool, football player
- May 24 – Cornell Belcher, political strategist
- May 25
  - Anne Heche, actress (d. 2022)
  - Stacy London, fashion consultant and media personality
- May 26
  - Mark D. Brenner, author, journalist, academic, and consultant
  - Siri Lindley, triathlete
- May 28 – Lynda Schlegel Culver, politician
- May 29
  - Toby Borland, baseball player
  - Mia Consalvo, University professor
- May 31
  - Sarah Uriarte Berry, actress and singer
  - Peter Clines, author and novelist

=== June ===
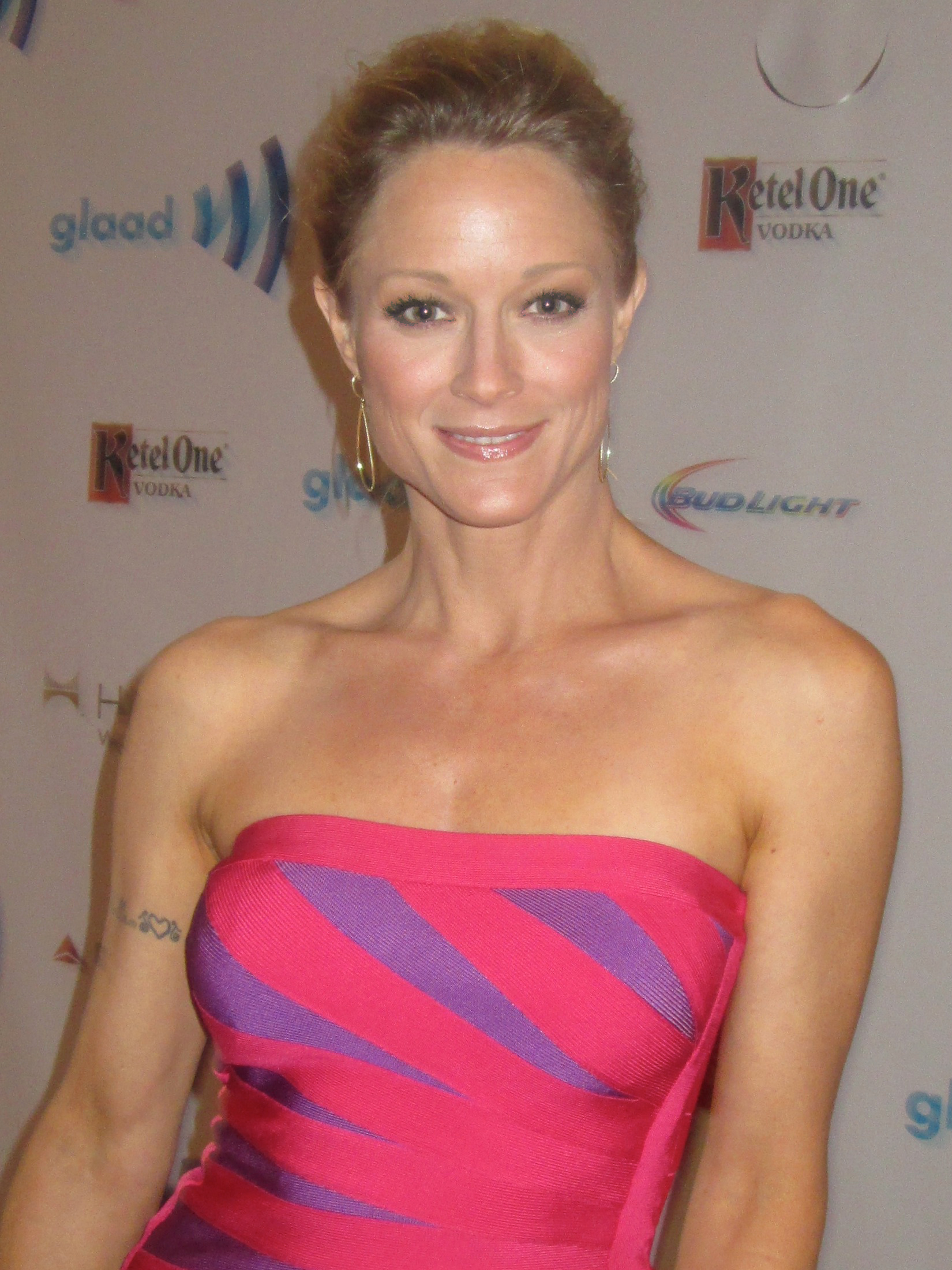
Teri Polo

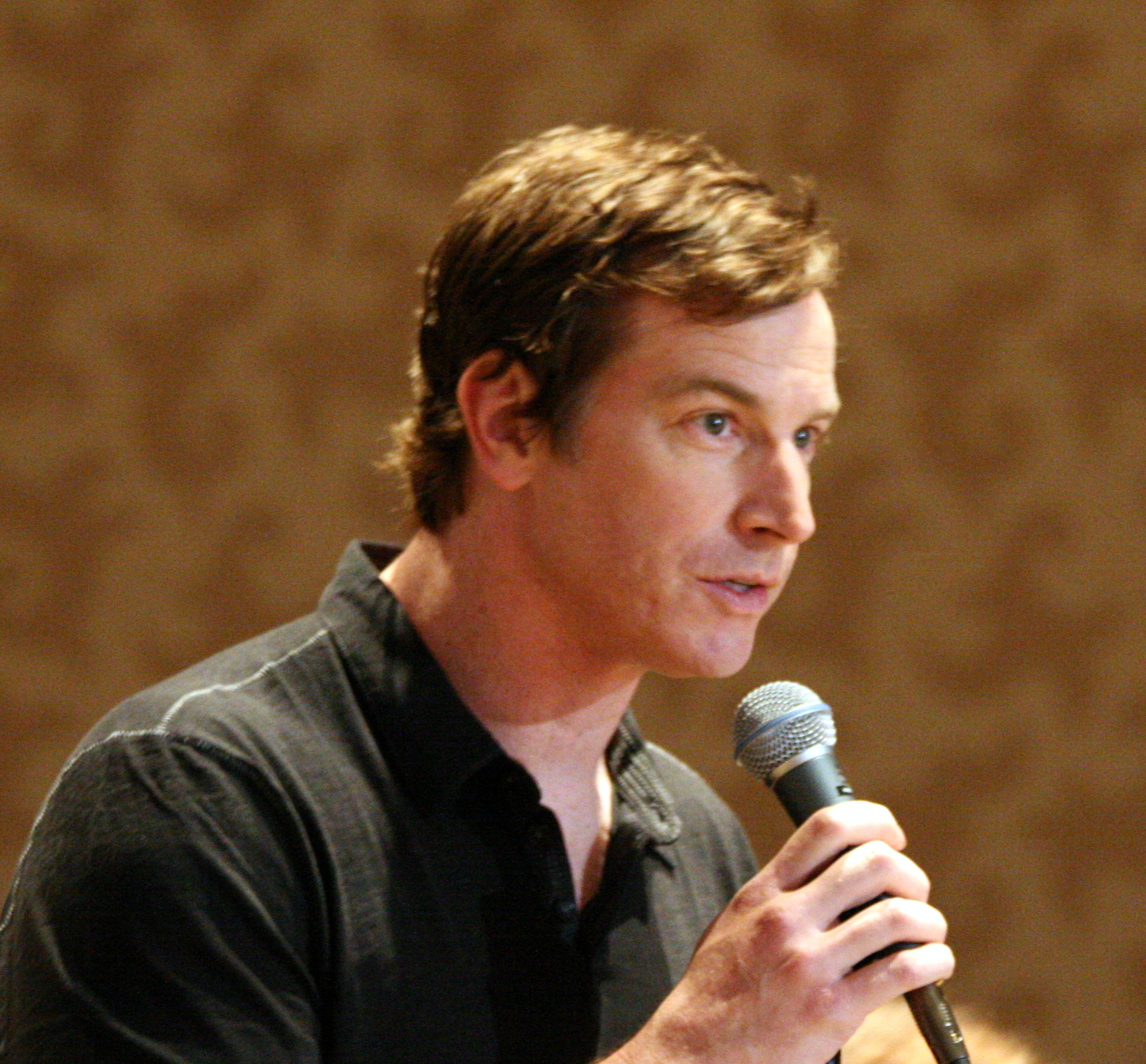
Rob Huebel

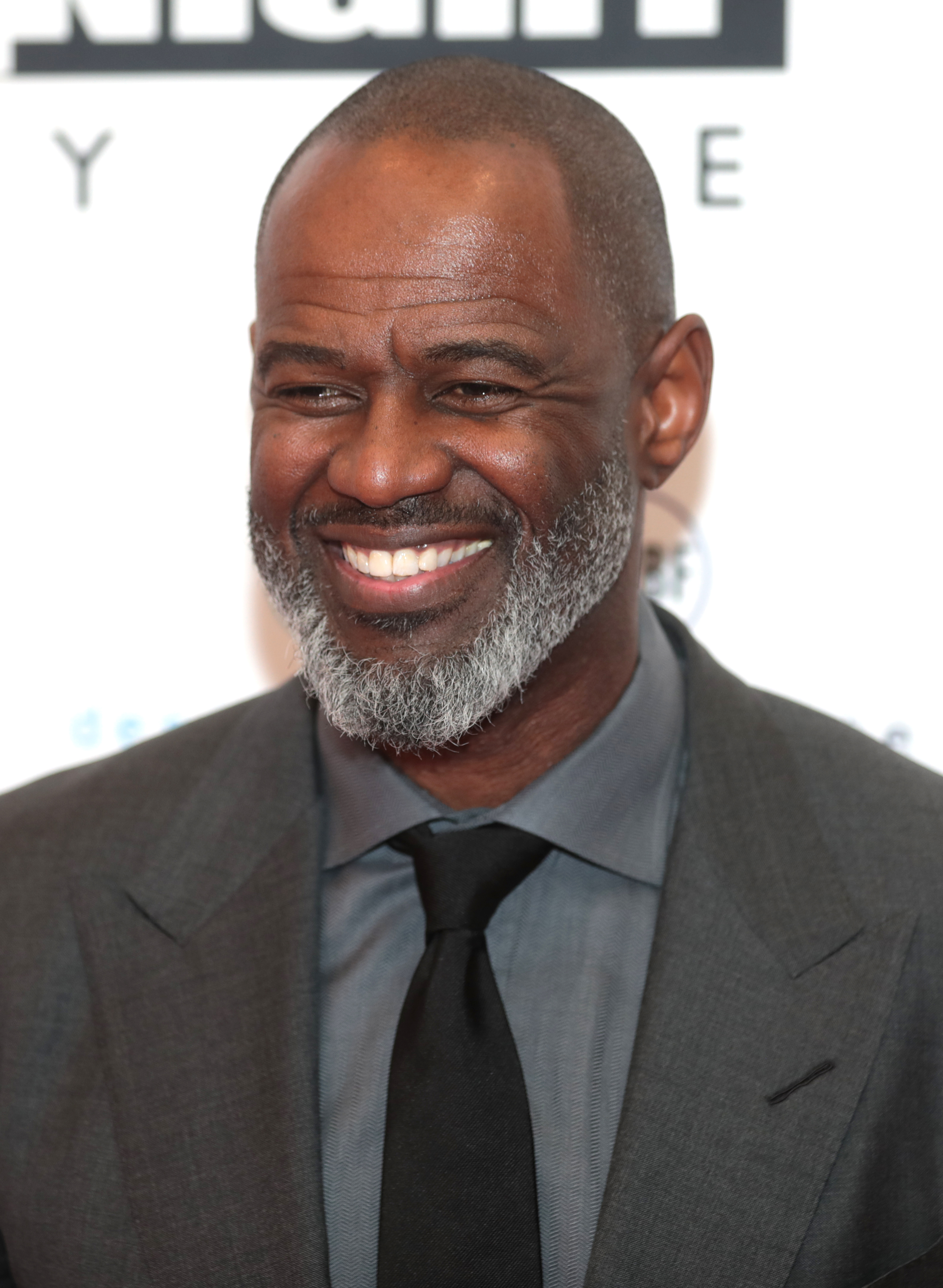
Brian McKnight

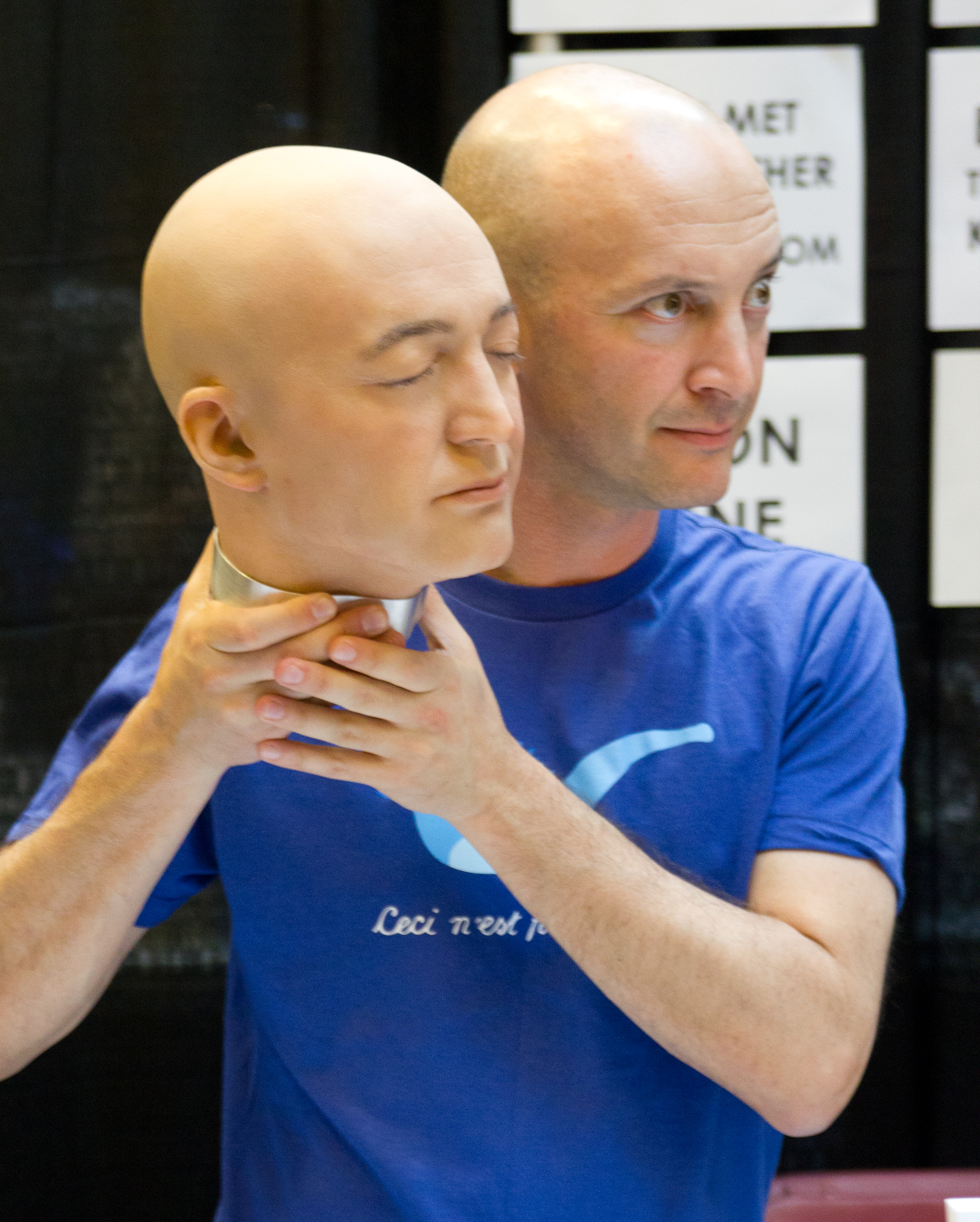
J. P. Manoux

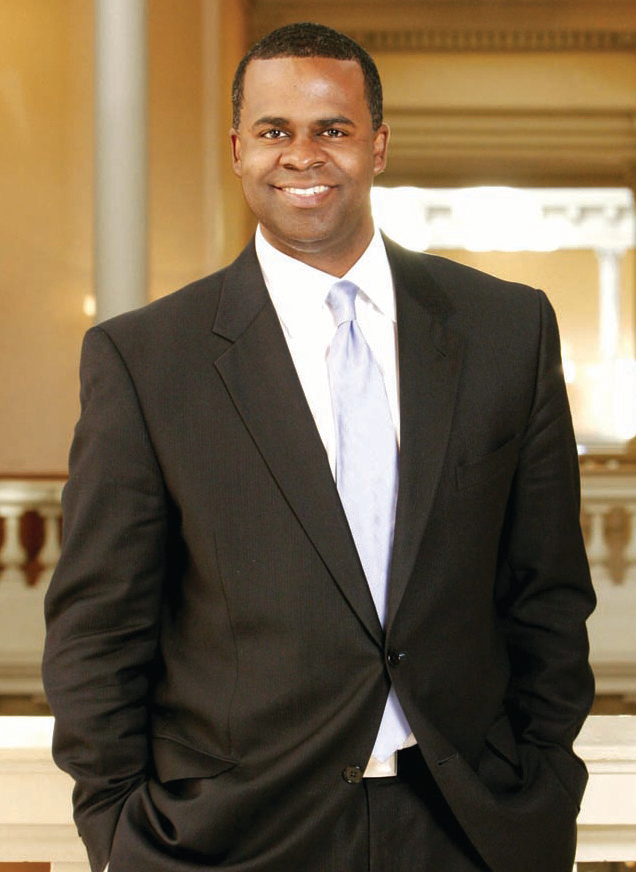
Kasim Reed

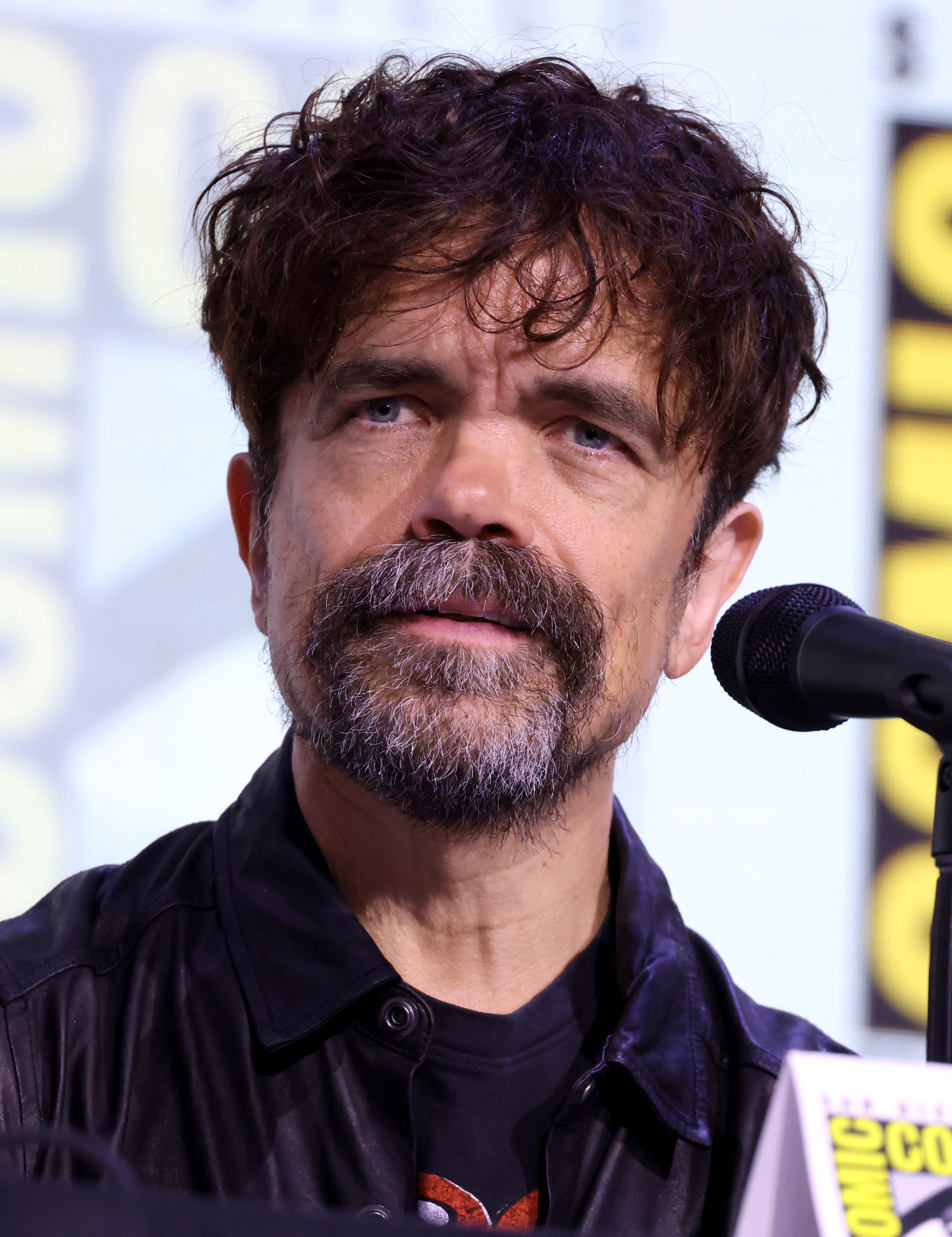
Peter Dinklage

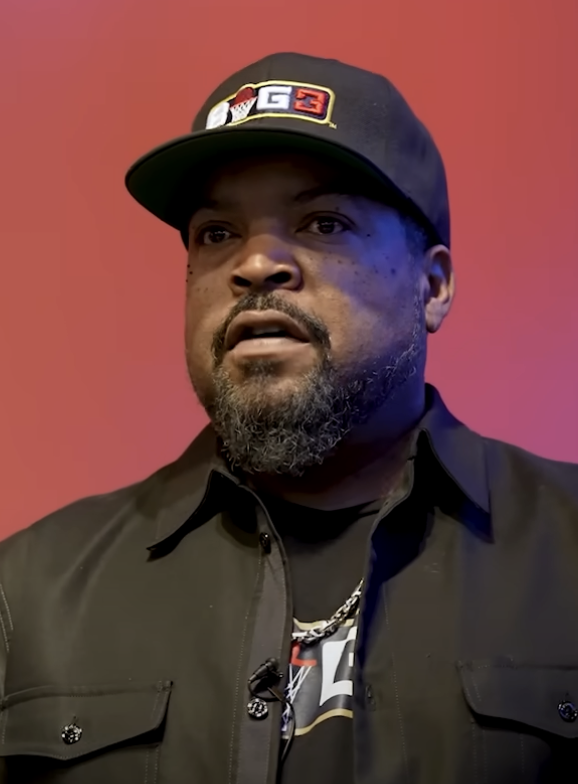
Ice Cube

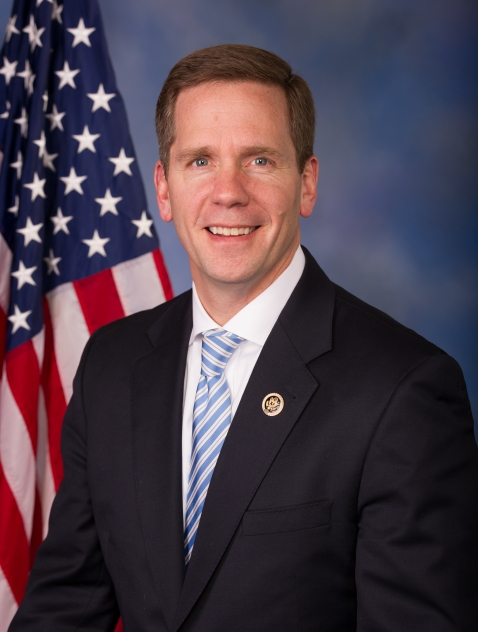
Bob Dold

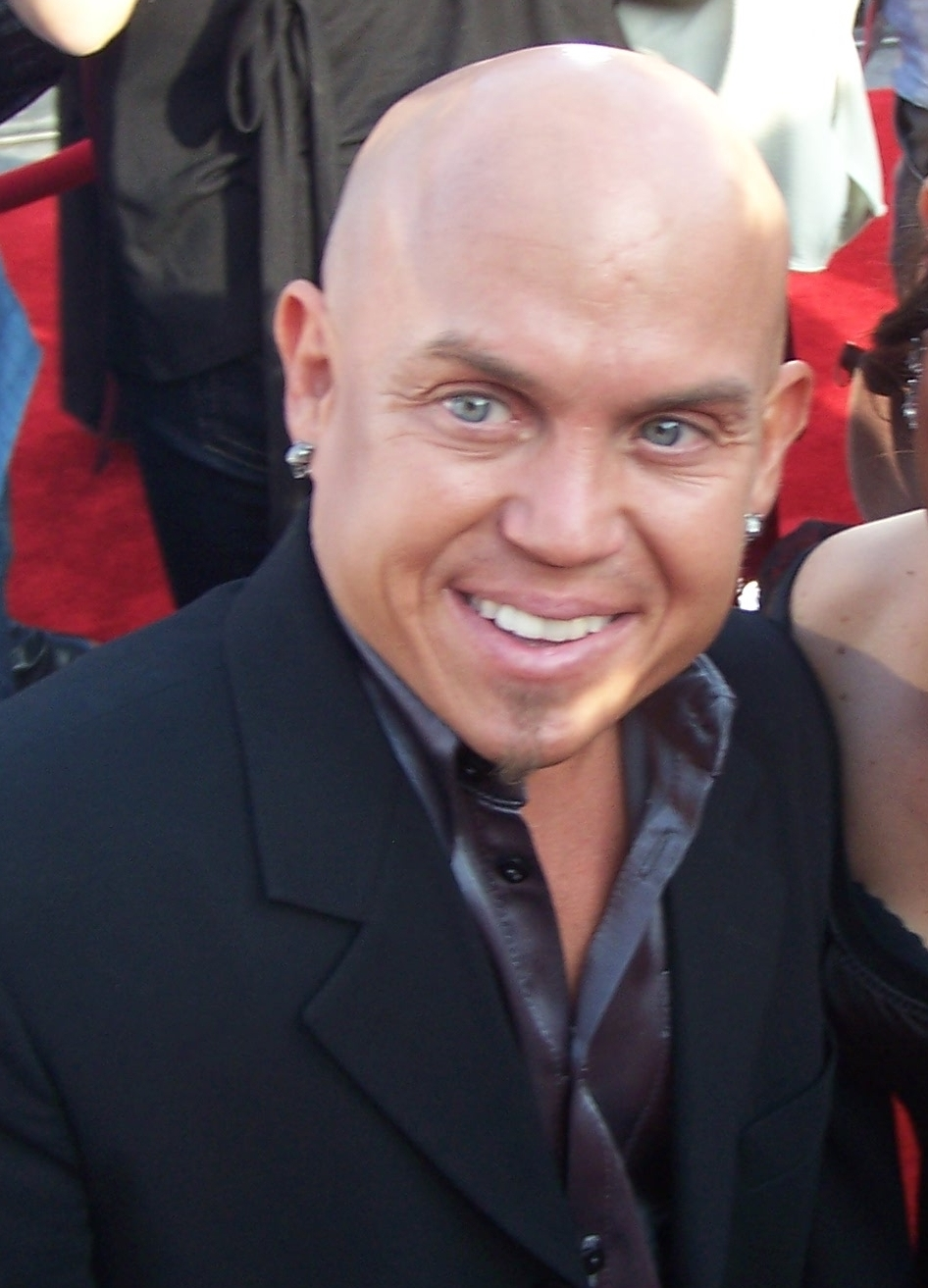
Martin Klebba

- June 1
  - Tony Bennett, basketball player and coach
  - Andy Bloch, poker player
  - Teri Polo, actress
- June 2 – Kurt Abbott, baseball player
- June 4
  - Rob Huebel, actor and comedian
  - Horatio Sanz, Chilean-born actor and comedian
- June 5
  - Christian Boeving, actor, writer, producer, fitness model, and personal trainer
  - Brian McKnight, R&B singer/songwriter
  - Jack Smith, attorney
- June 6
  - Stephen Bowen, politician
  - David Coombs, lawyer
  - Mike Croel, football player
- June 7 – Kim Rhodes, actress
- June 8 – J. P. Manoux, actor
- June 10
  - Greg Bicknell, baseball player
  - Kasim Reed, lawyer and politician, mayor of Atlanta (2010-2018)
- June 11
  - Liles C. Burke, judge
  - Peter Dinklage, actor
  - Steven Drozd, singer/songwriter
  - Kip Miller, ice hockey player
- June 12 – Corey Corbin, politician
- June 14
  - Brooks Ashmanskas, actor
  - Satveer Chaudhary, lawyer and politician
  - Elroy Chester, convicted serial killer, rapist, and burglar (d. 2013)
  - Eugene Chung, football player
  - Kyle Hebert, voice actor
- June 15
  - Idalis DeLeón, actress, singer, and host
  - Ice Cube, actor and rapper
- June 16
  - Eric Collins, sports announcer
  - Alberto Coutinho, politician
  - Robert Hurt, politician
  - Sam Register, television producer and businessman
  - MC Ren, rapper
- June 17
  - Kevin Carroll, football player
  - Amy Keating Rogers, television producer and writer
- June 18
  - Stephanos Bibas, lawyer and judge
  - Jeff Carter, bowler
  - Pokey Chatman, basketball player and coach
- June 19
  - Jonathan P. Braga, Army Lieutenant General
  - Thomas Breitling, journalist and businessman
  - Lara Spencer, journalist
- June 20
  - Tim Bee, politician
  - Jeff Bussgang, entrepreneur, author, and venture capitalist
- June 21 – Pat Sansone, guitarist
- June 22
  - Kimilee Bryant, actress, singer, and beauty pageant titleholder
  - Jim Cawley, politician, 32nd Lieutenant Governor of Pennsylvania (2011-2015)
- June 23
  - John Benton, Olympic curler
  - Bob Dold, politician
  - Martin Klebba, actor
- June 24
  - Chris Ballard, football coach and GM
  - Rich Eisen, television journalist
- June 25
  - Daniel Cartier, singer/songwriter and actor
  - Michael Christie, golfer (d. 2004)
  - Duane Cooper, basketball player
  - Storm Large, singer and actress
- June 26
  - Harry Boatswain, football player (d. 2005)
  - Mike Myers, baseball pitcher
- June 27
  - Clint Bowen, football player and coach
  - Heather Bresch, business executive, CEO of Mylan
- June 28
  - Aimee Bender, novelist
  - Danielle Brisebois, actress and singer/songwriter
  - Garth Snow, ice hockey player and manager
- June 29 – Tina Basich, snowboarder
- June 30 – Kirk Black, Paralympic curler

=== July ===
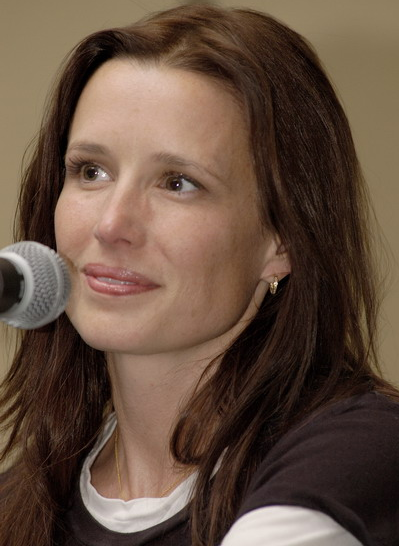
Shawnee Smith

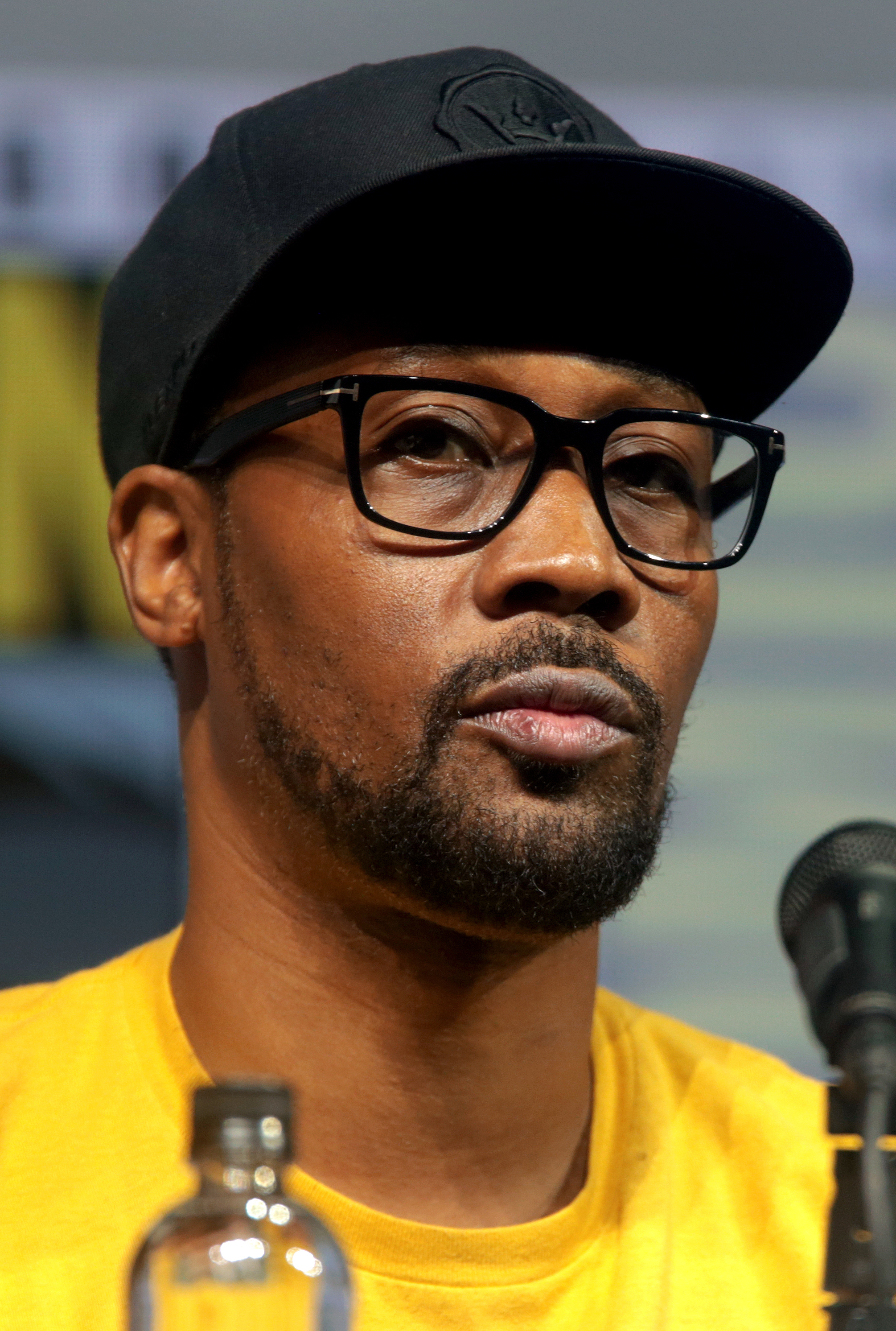
RZA

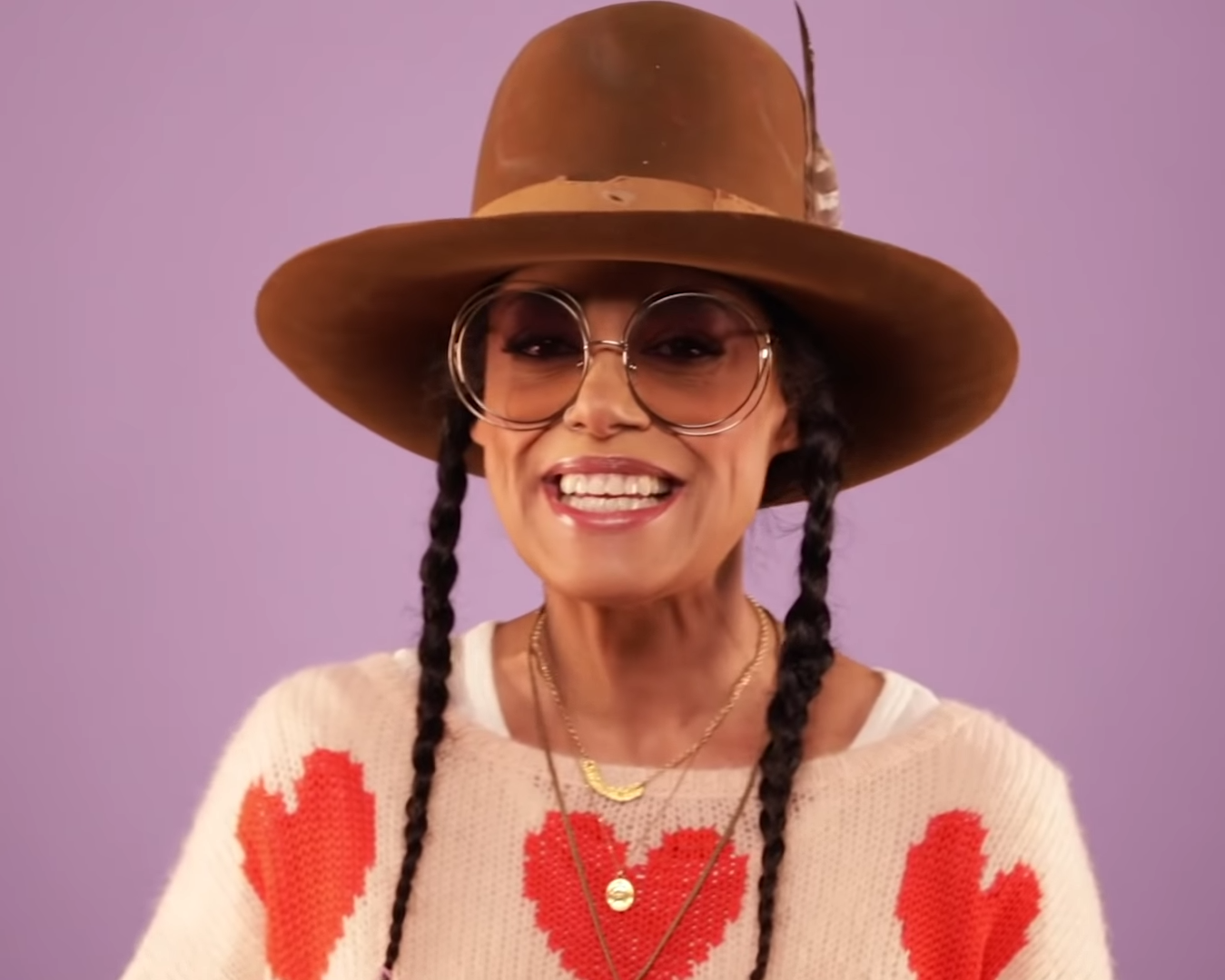
Cree Summer

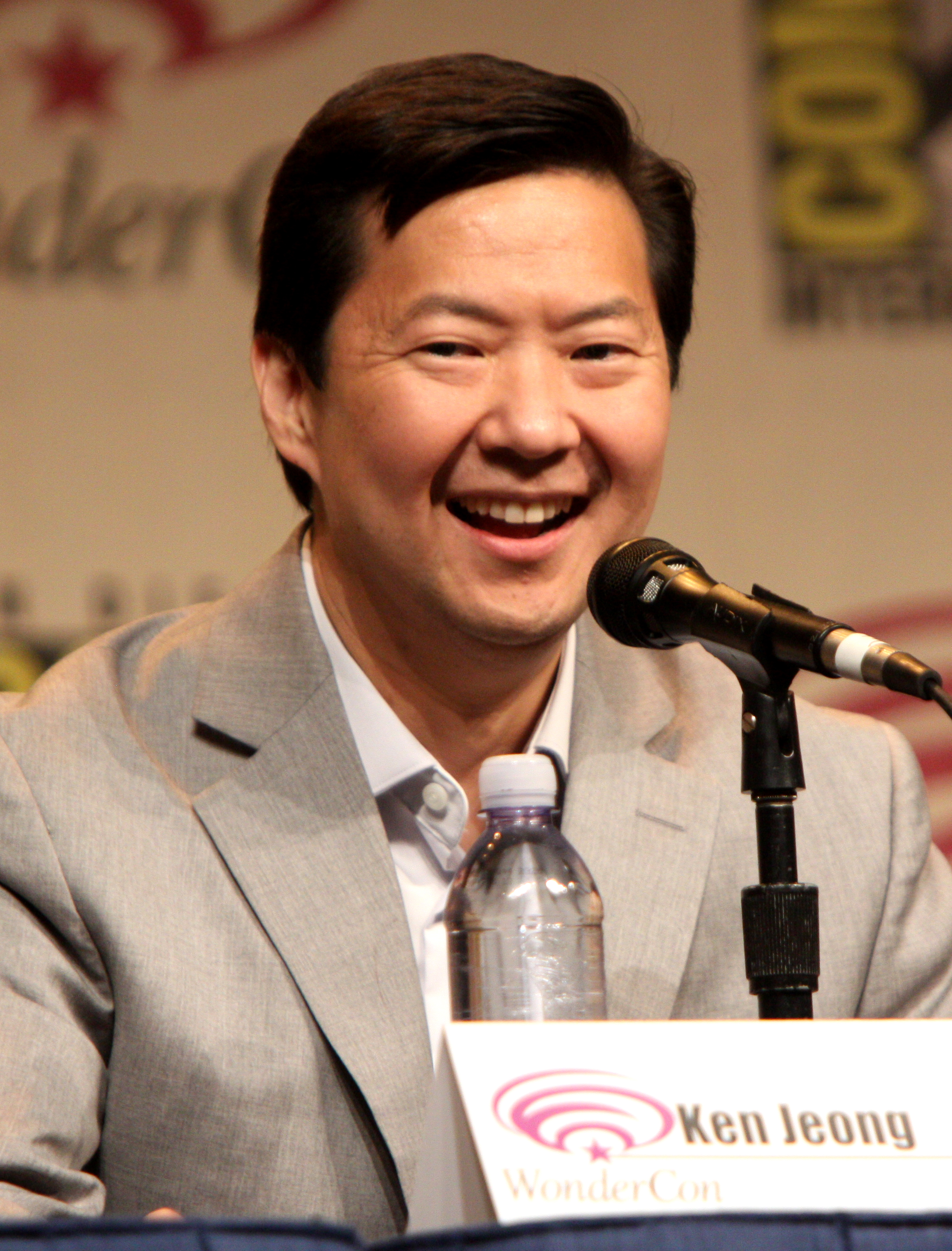
Ken Jeong

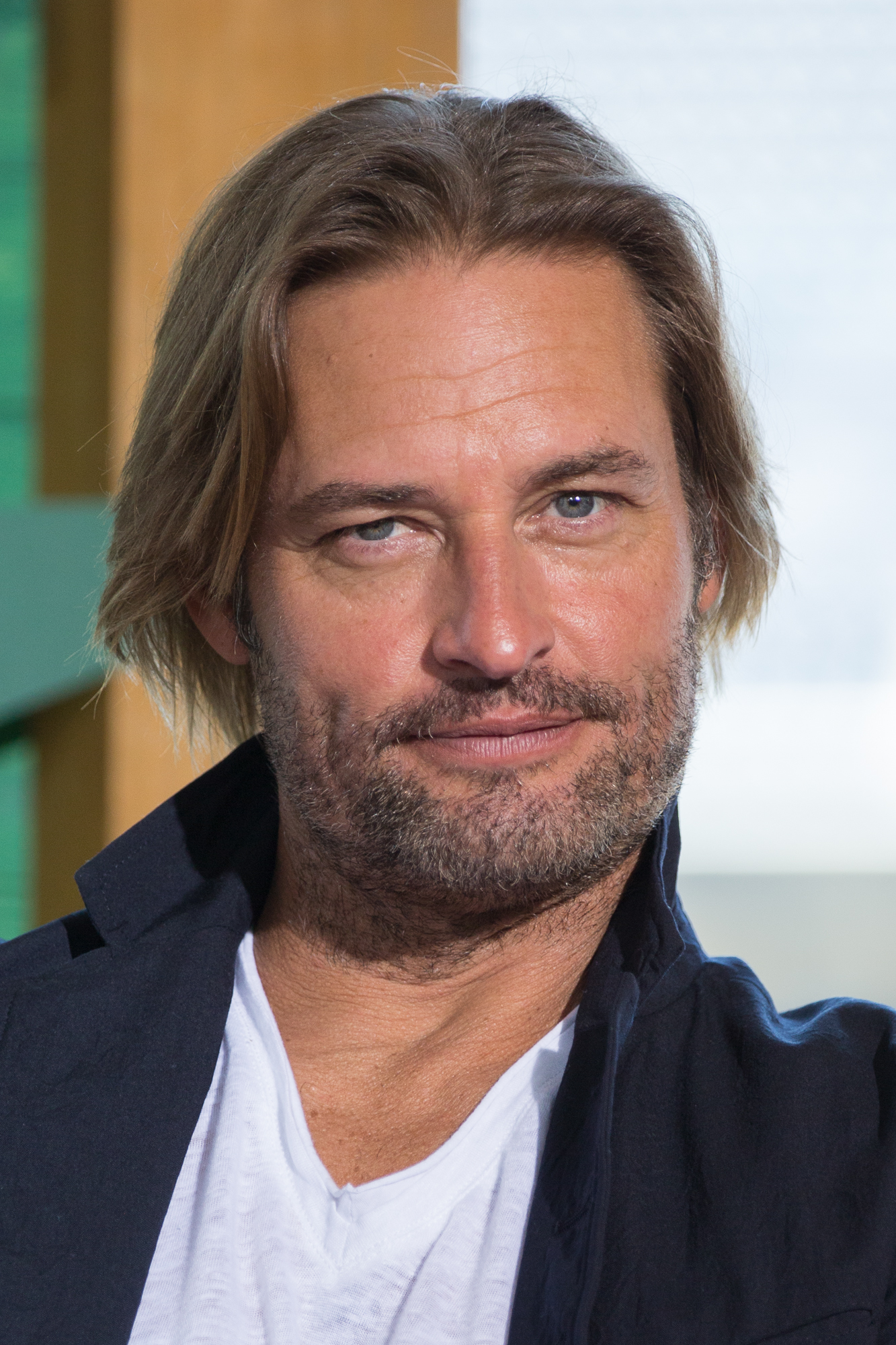
Josh Holloway

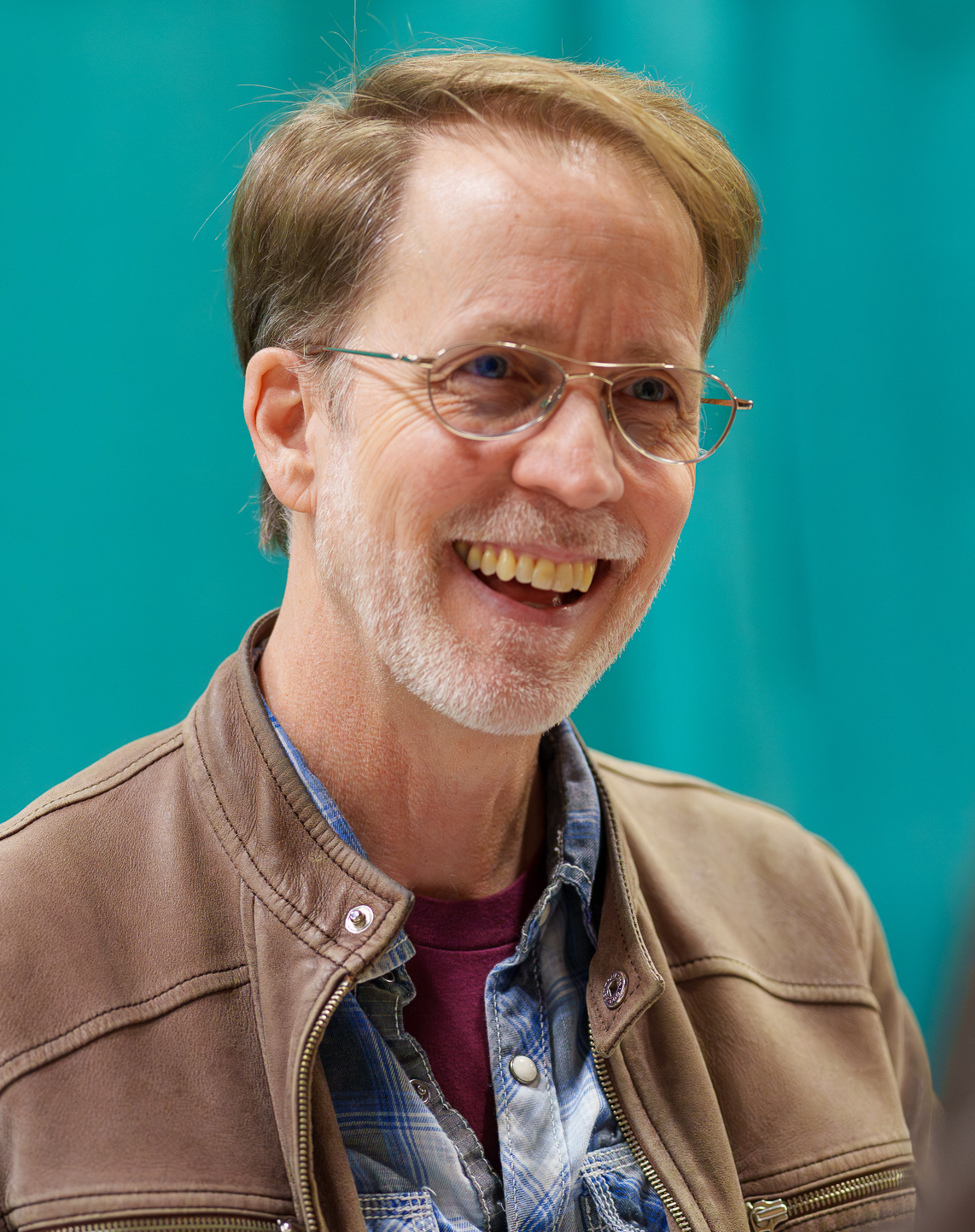
James Arnold Taylor

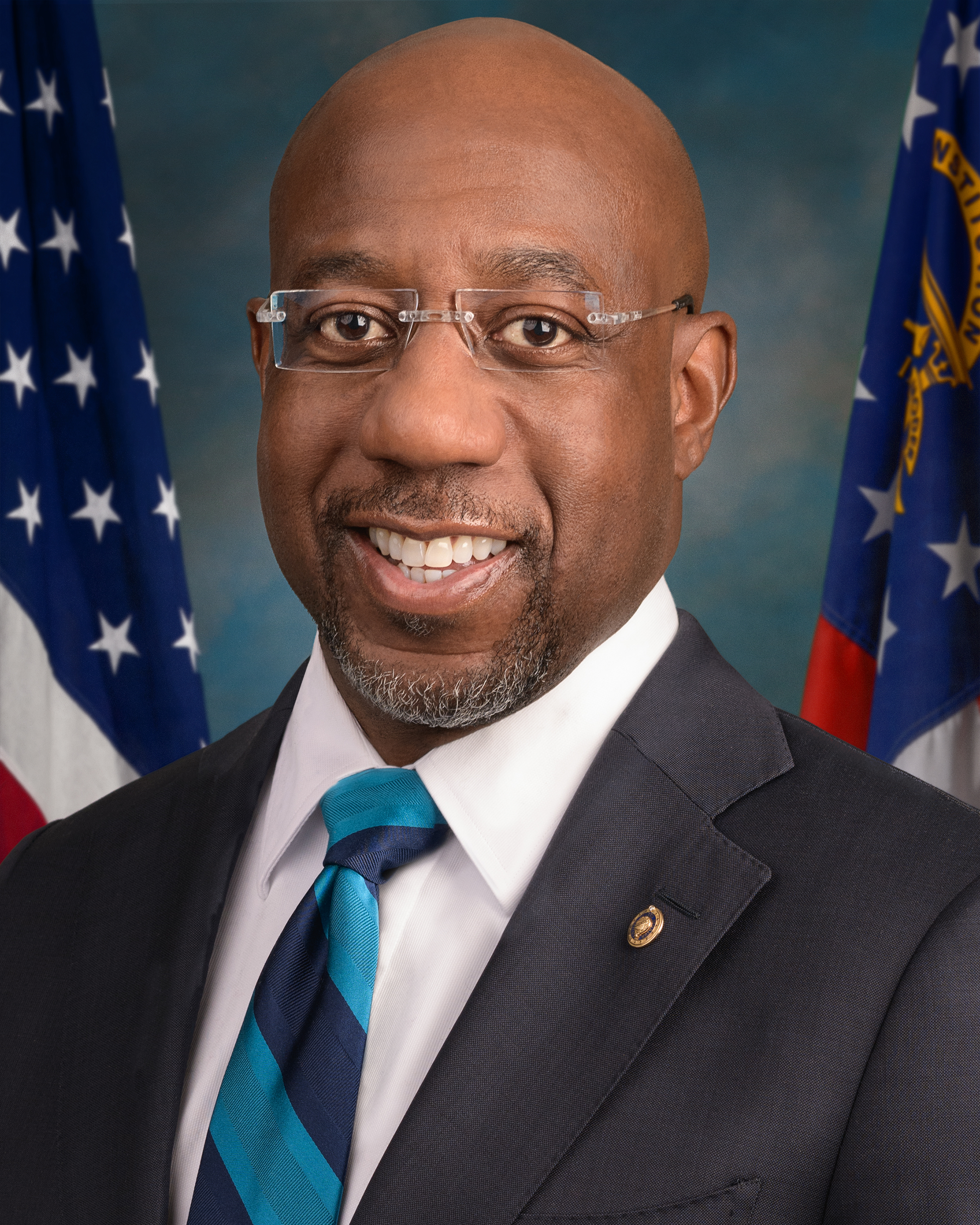
Raphael Warnock

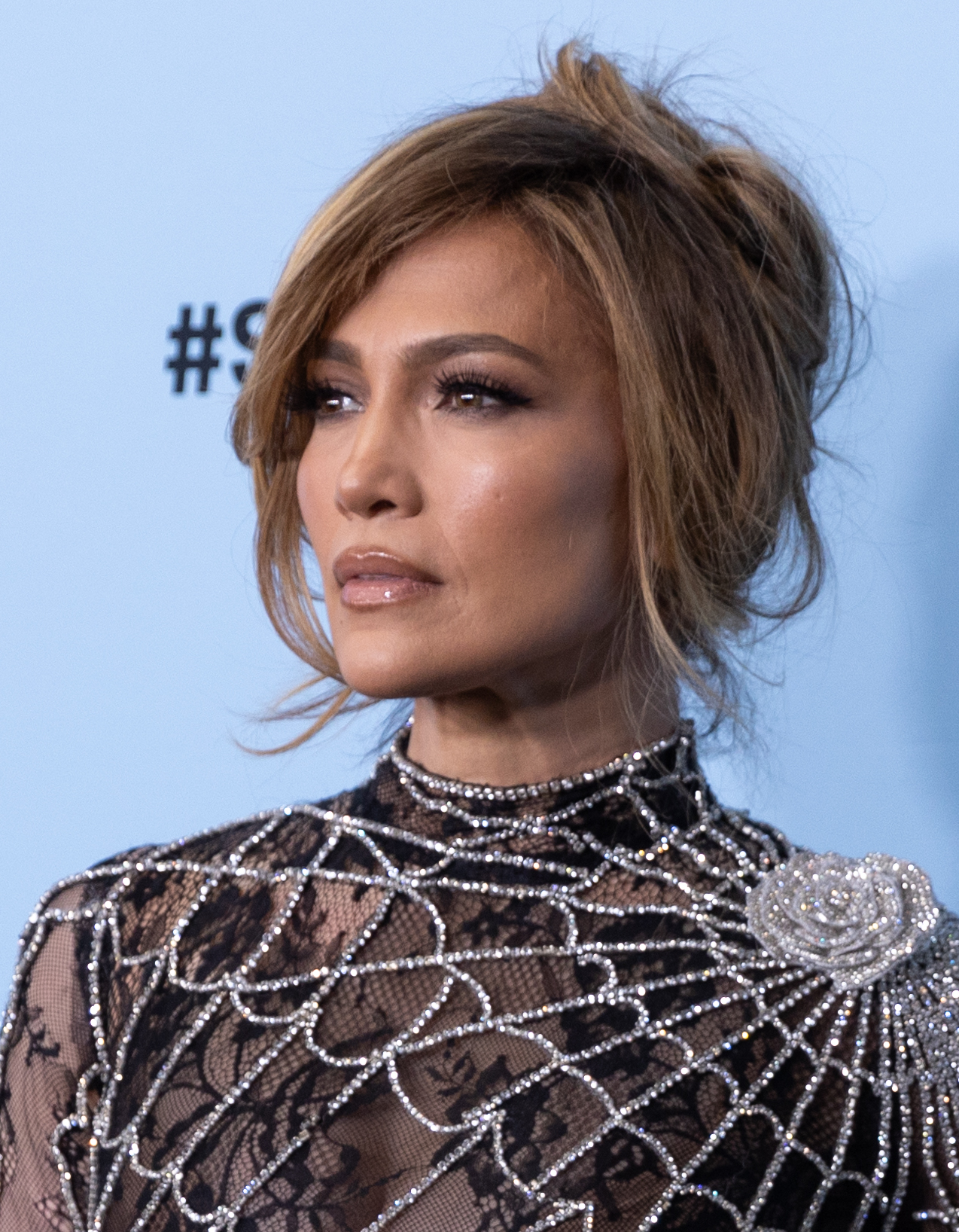
Jennifer Lopez

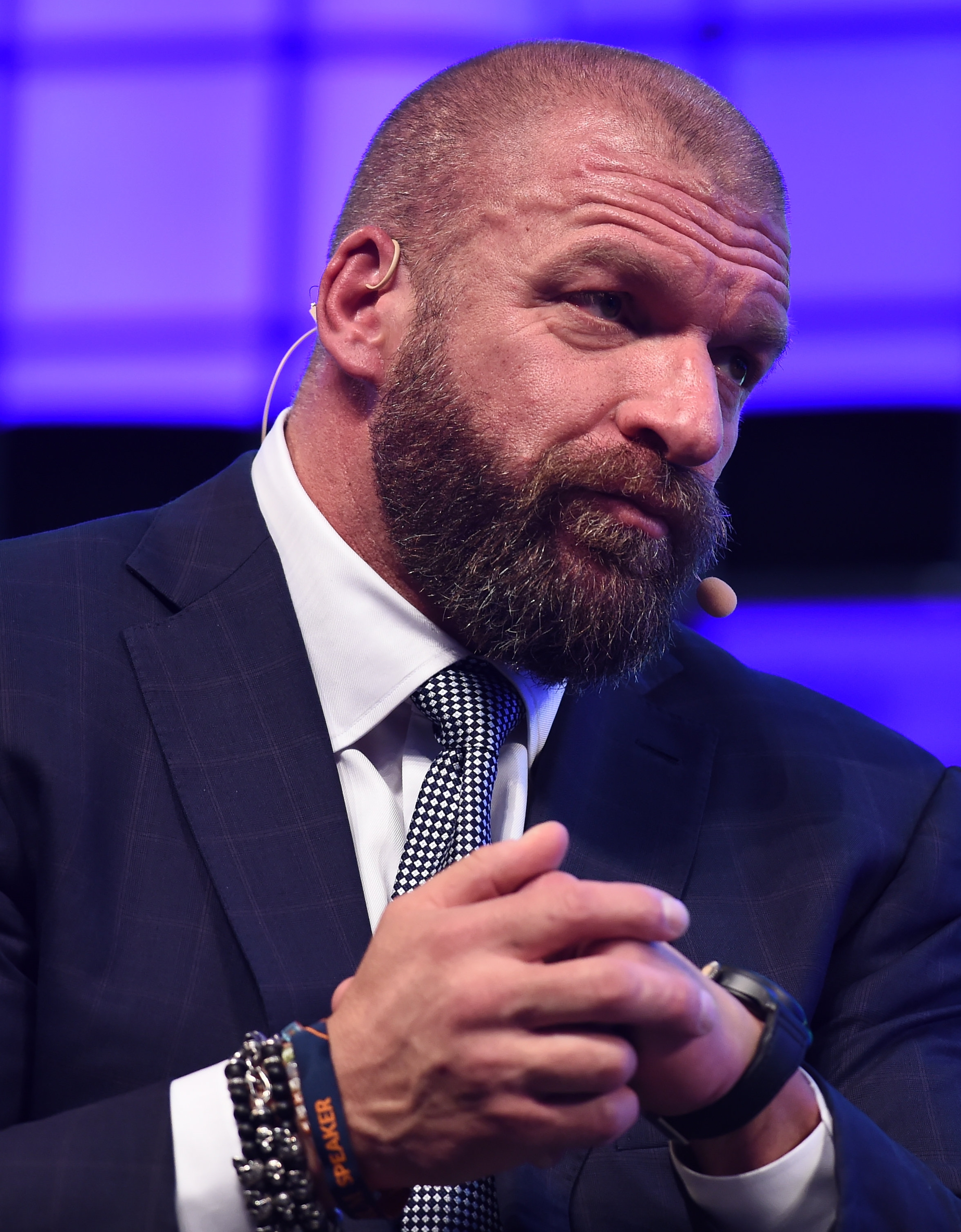
Triple H

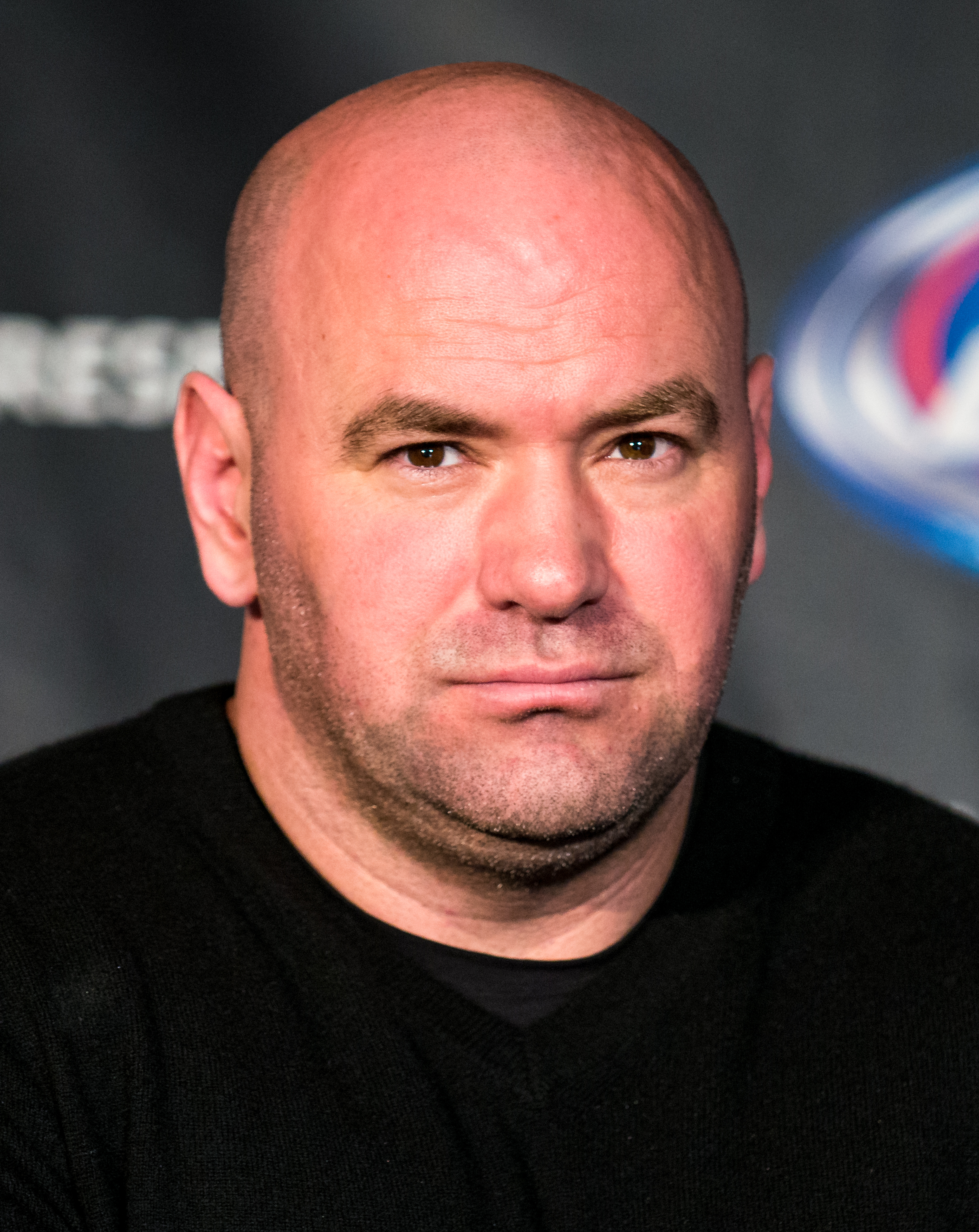
Dana White

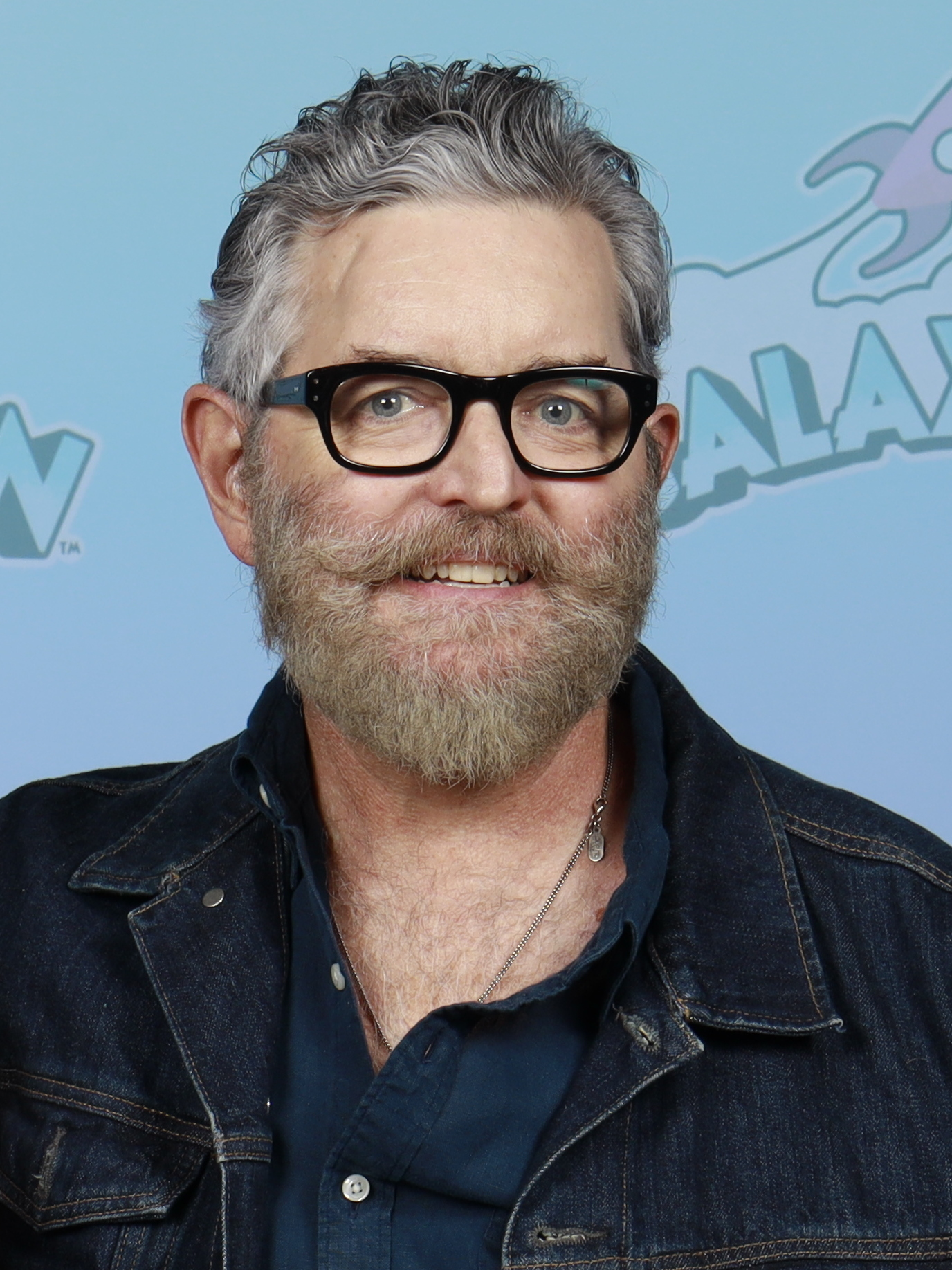
Timothy Omundson

- July 1
  - Gary Brown, football player (d. 2022)
  - Jason Derek Brown, armed robber, murderer, and fugitive
- July 2
  - Matthew Cox, criminal
  - Jenni Rivera, American-born Mexican singer/songwriter, producer, and actress (d. 2012)
  - Tony Touch, hip hop break dancer, singer/songwriter, producer, and DJ
- July 3
  - Ishmael Butler, rapper, record producer, and songwriter
  - Mykel Shannon Jenkins, actor and filmmaker
  - Shawnee Smith, actress and rock singer
- July 4
  - Al Golden, football player and coach
  - Todd Marinovich, football player and coach
  - Jordan Sonnenblick, teacher and novelist
- July 5
  - Marc Brown, basketball player and coach
  - Jack Conway, politician
  - John LeClair, hockey player
  - RZA, rapper and record producer, member of Wu-Tang Clan
- July 6
  - Beverly McClellan, singer and reality talent show finalist (d. 2018)
  - Christopher Scarver, serial killer
  - Brian Van Holt, actor
- July 7
  - Keith Baker, game designer and fantasy novelist
  - Cree Summer, American-born Canadian actress, voice actress, and singer
- July 8
  - Paul Brown, stock car racing driver (d. 2012)
  - Combat Jack, hip hop podcaster (d. 2017)
  - George Fisher, vocalist for Cannibal Corpse
  - Brad Lander, politician
- July 10
  - Marty Cordova, baseball player
  - Laura Gillen, politician
  - Gale Harold, actor
  - Ken Wickham, author
- July 11
  - Mark Carlson, MLB umpire
  - Jim Coan, University professor
- July 12
  - Sal Barbier, designer
  - Shonia Brown, author
- July 13
  - Gregory Brady, Army Lieutenant General
  - Ken Jeong, actor, comedian and physician
- July 14
  - Joe Brant, serial killer
  - Colleen Coover, comic book artist and author
  - Billy Herrington, gay pornographic actor (d. 2018)
- July 15
  - Peter Ciavaglia, ice hockey player
  - John Crotty, basketball player
  - Chris Wyse, bassist of Owl and The Cult
- July 16 – Robert Consalvo, politician
- July 17
  - Ramon Bejarano, bishop
  - Nate Bell, politician
  - Rockin' Johnny Burgin, blues musician
  - David Ciardi, astronomer
  - Ernie Cope, stock car racing driver
- July 18
  - Rob Calloway, boxer
  - Elizabeth Gilbert, author
- July 19
  - Stuart Blumberg, screenwriter, actor, producer, and director
  - Chyskillz, record producer, DJ, musician, rapper, and member of Onyx (d. 2018)
  - Chris Kratt, educational nature show host
  - Courtenay Taylor, voice artist
- July 20
  - Josh Holloway, actor and model
  - Vitamin C, singer/songwriter
- July 21
  - Jen Bilik, book editor and founder and CEO of Knock Knock
  - Cedric Boswell, boxer
  - Heberto Castillo Jr., Panamanian-born jockey
  - Godfrey, comedian and actor
  - Emerson Hart, singer/songwriter, guitarist, and frontman for Tonic
- July 22
  - Jason Becker, heavy metal guitarist for Cacophony
  - John Cariani, actor and playwright
  - James Arnold Taylor, voice artist
- July 23
  - John Cariani, actor and playwright
  - Bill Chott, actor and comedian
  - Raphael Warnock, pastor and politician
- July 24
  - Max Burnett, screenwriter, director, and producer
  - Eddie Croft, boxer
  - Jennifer Lopez, actress and singer
- July 25
  - Jon Barry, sports broadcaster
  - Mike Black, football player
  - Rodney Blackshear, football player
  - Marc Boutte, football player (d. 2025)
  - Jason Harris Katz, voice artist and television host
- July 26
  - Pat Bates, golfer
  - Greg Colbrunn, baseball player and coach
- July 27
  - Farai Chideya, novelist, journalist, and radio host
  - Triple H, wrestler
- July 28
  - Alexis Arquette, actress (d. 2016)
  - Anthony Butts, poet
  - Dana White, businessman and president of UFC
- July 29
  - Angela Barker-Jones, judge (d. 2018)
  - Timothy Omundson, actor

=== August ===
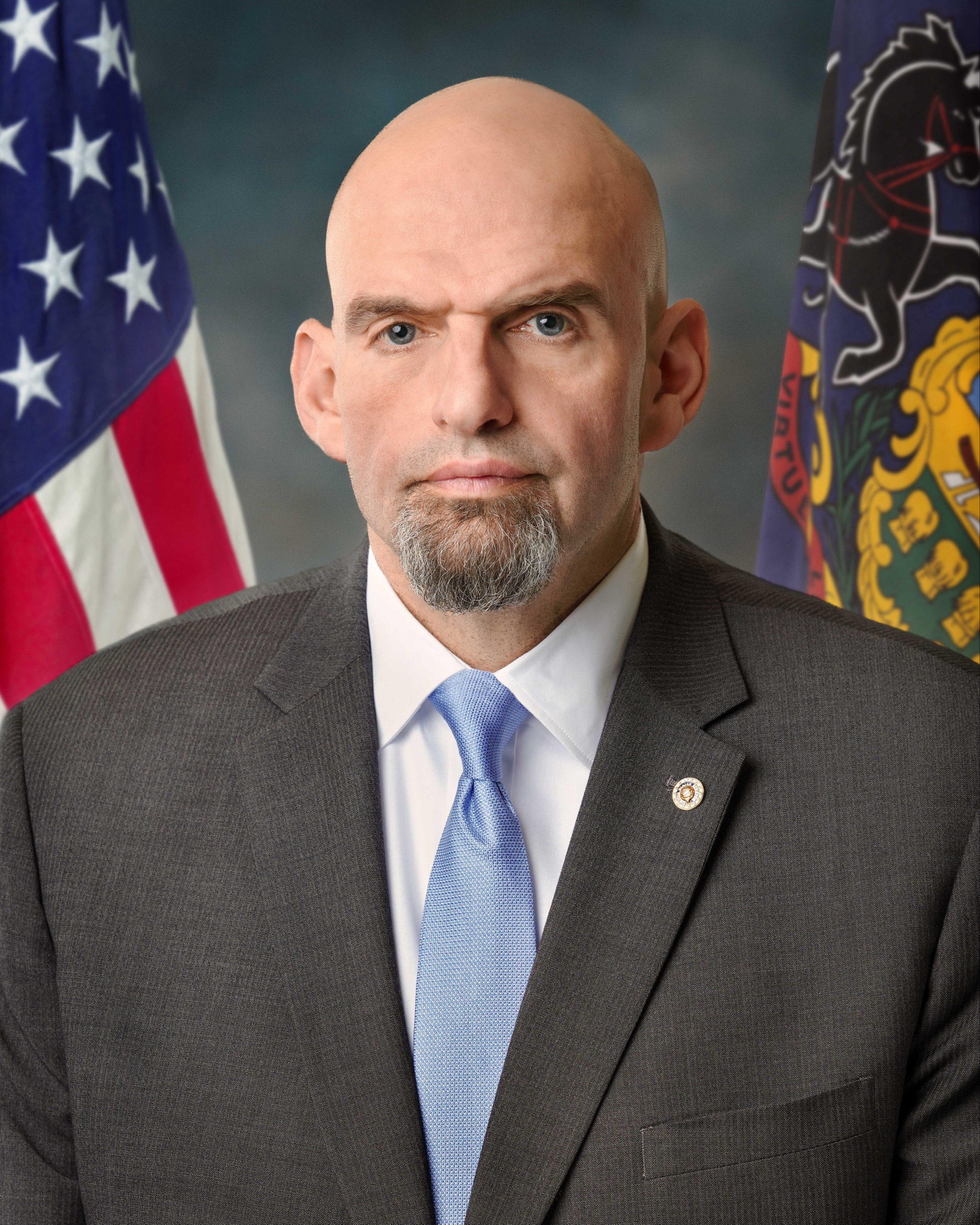
John Fetterman

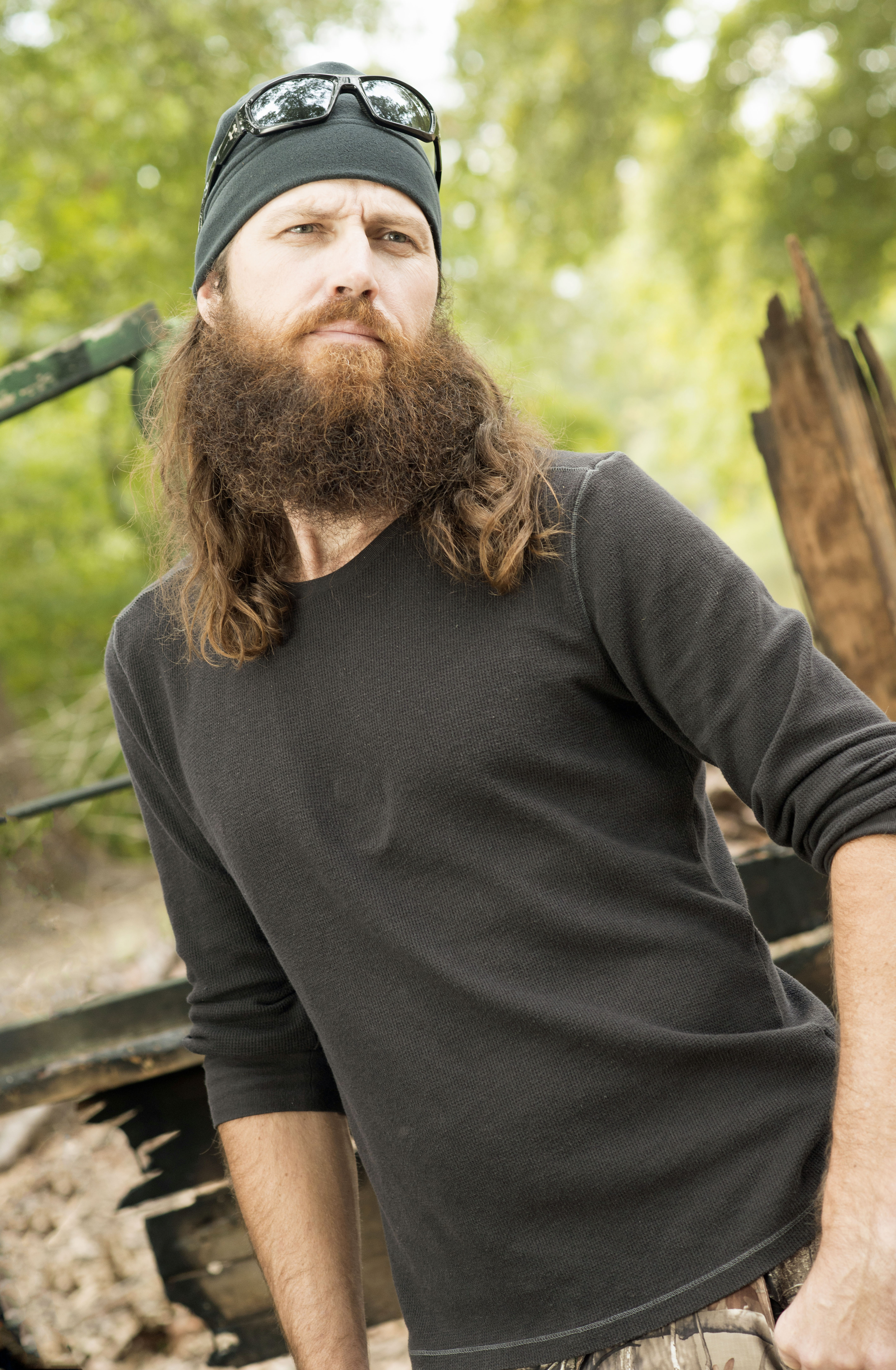
Jase Robertson

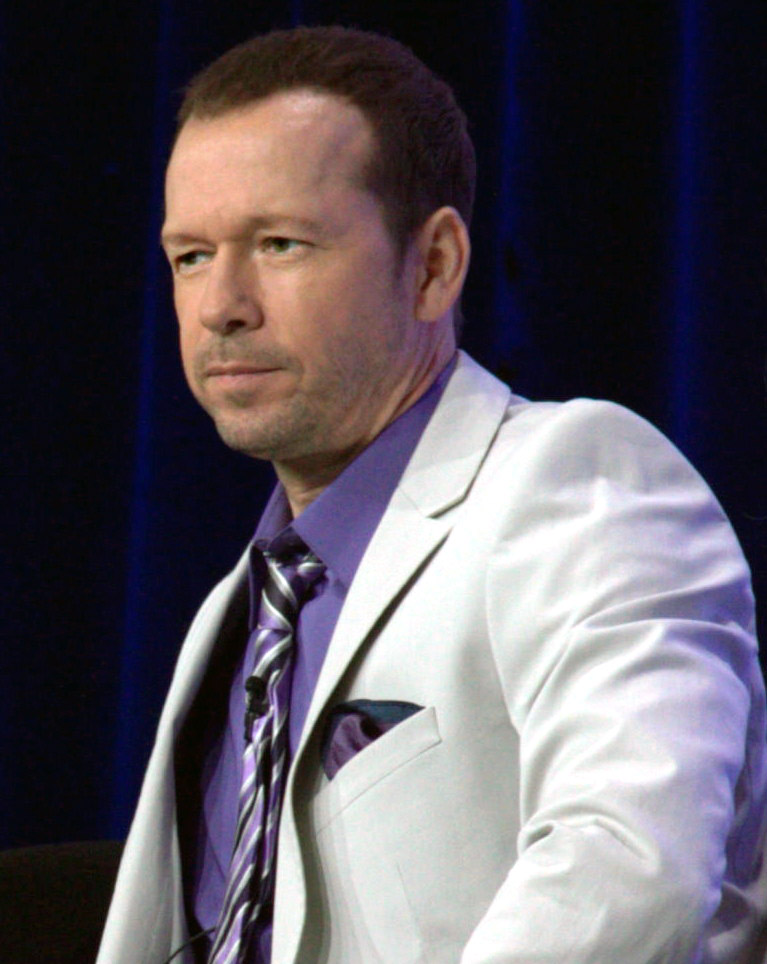
Donnie Wahlberg

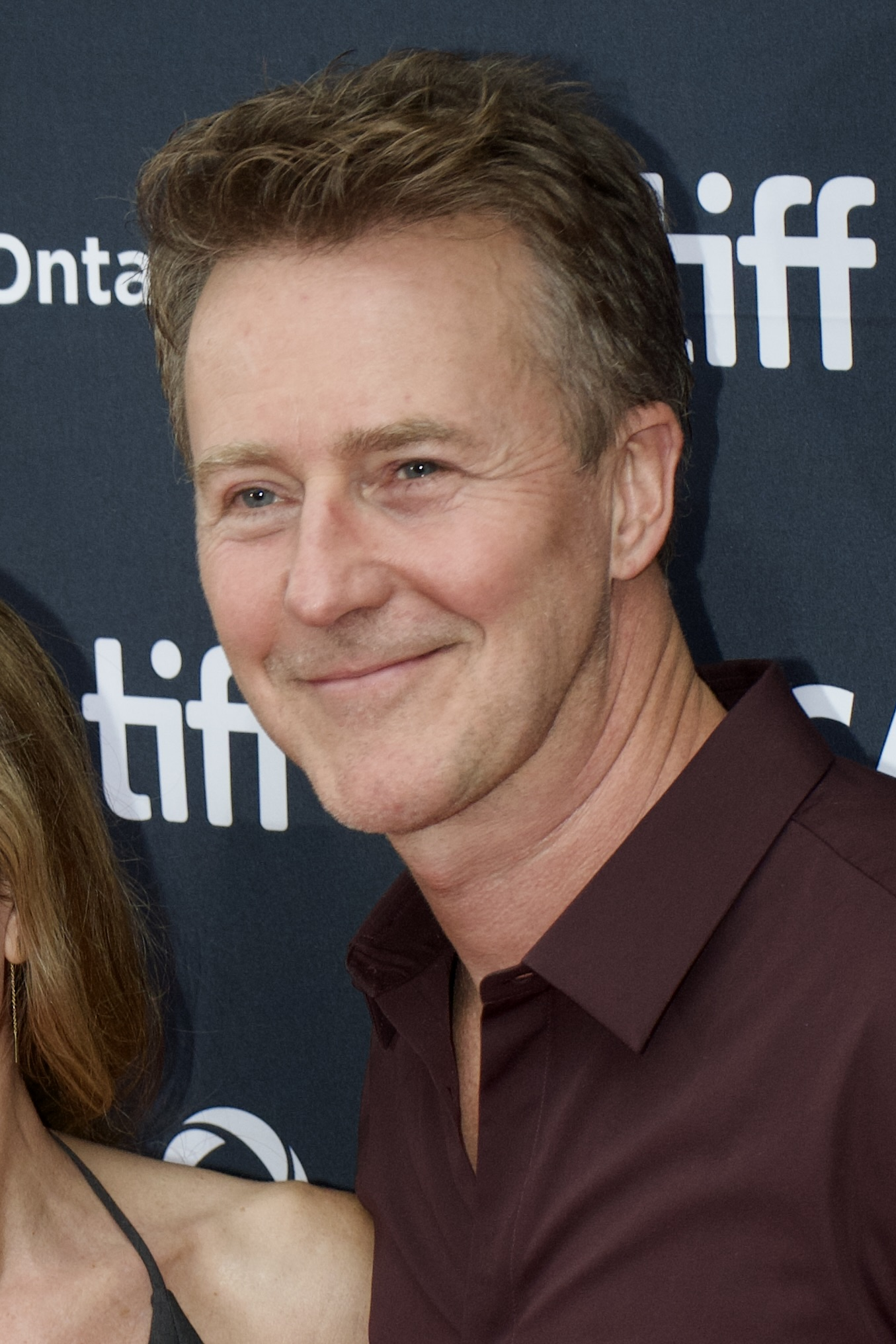
Edward Norton

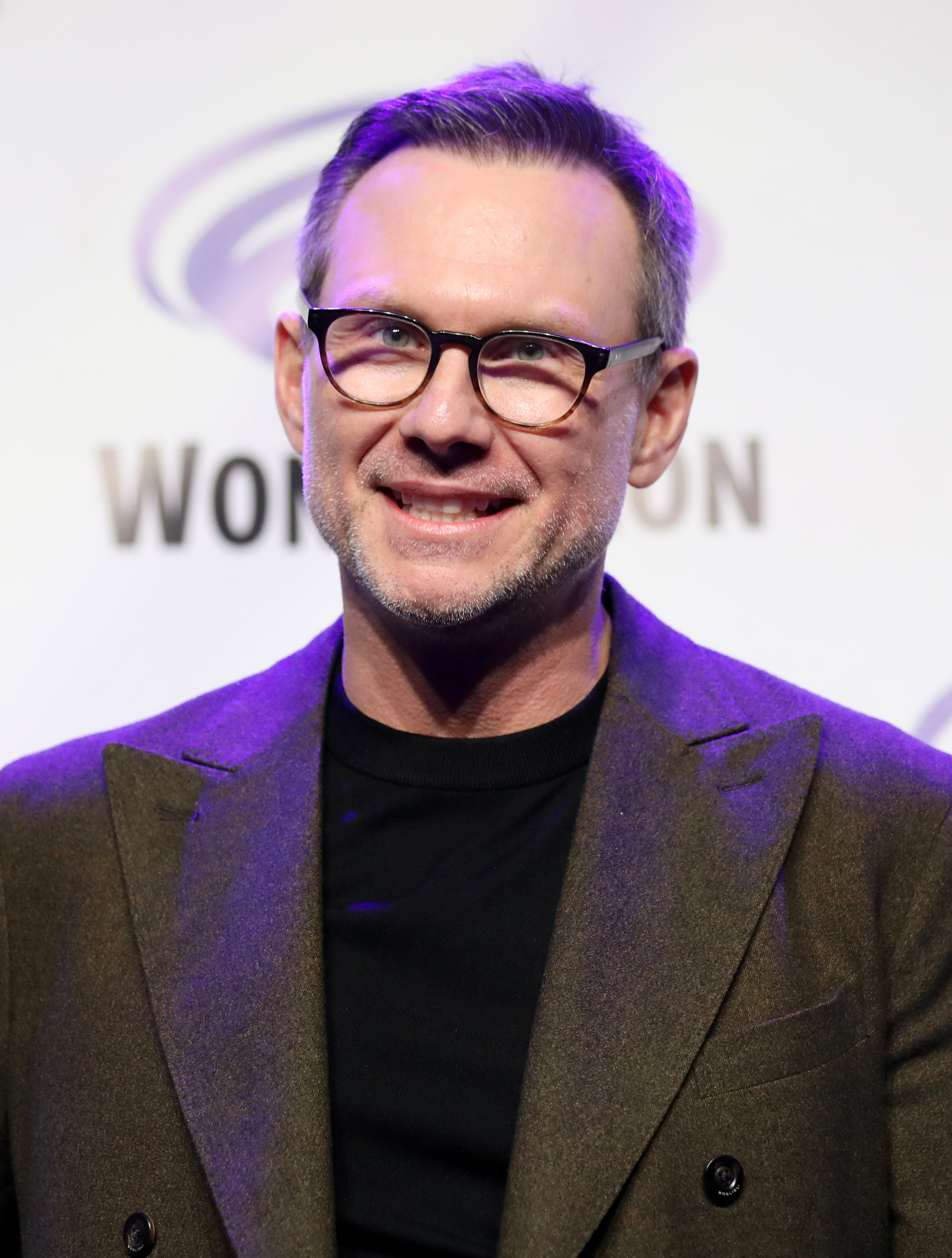
Christian Slater

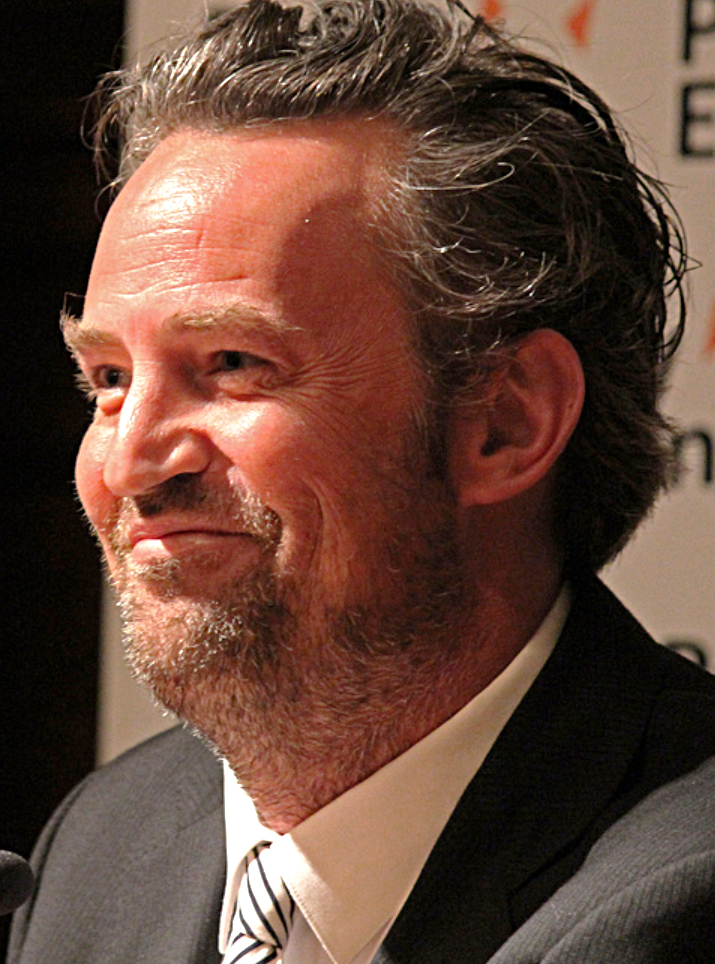
Matthew Perry

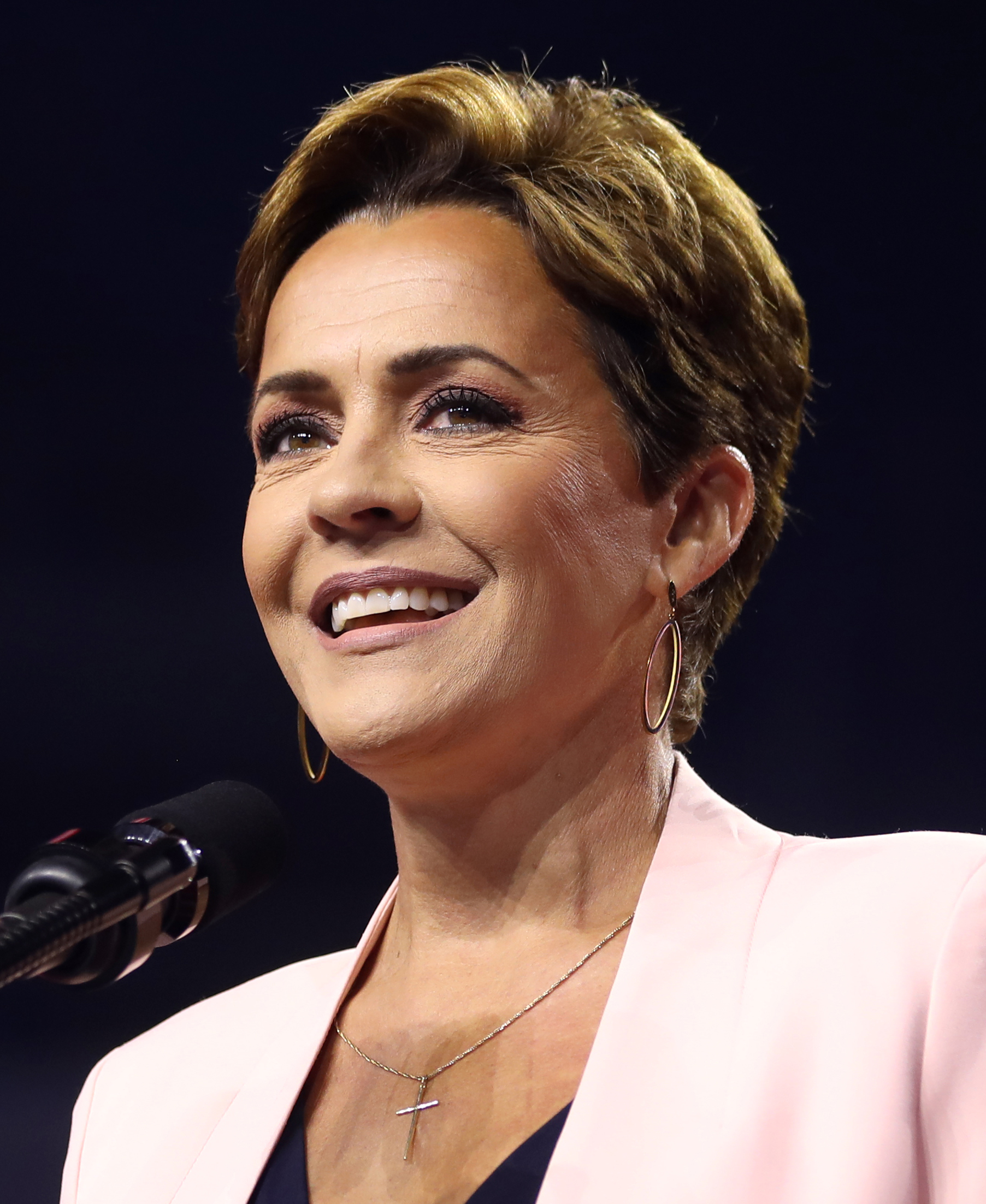
Kari Lake

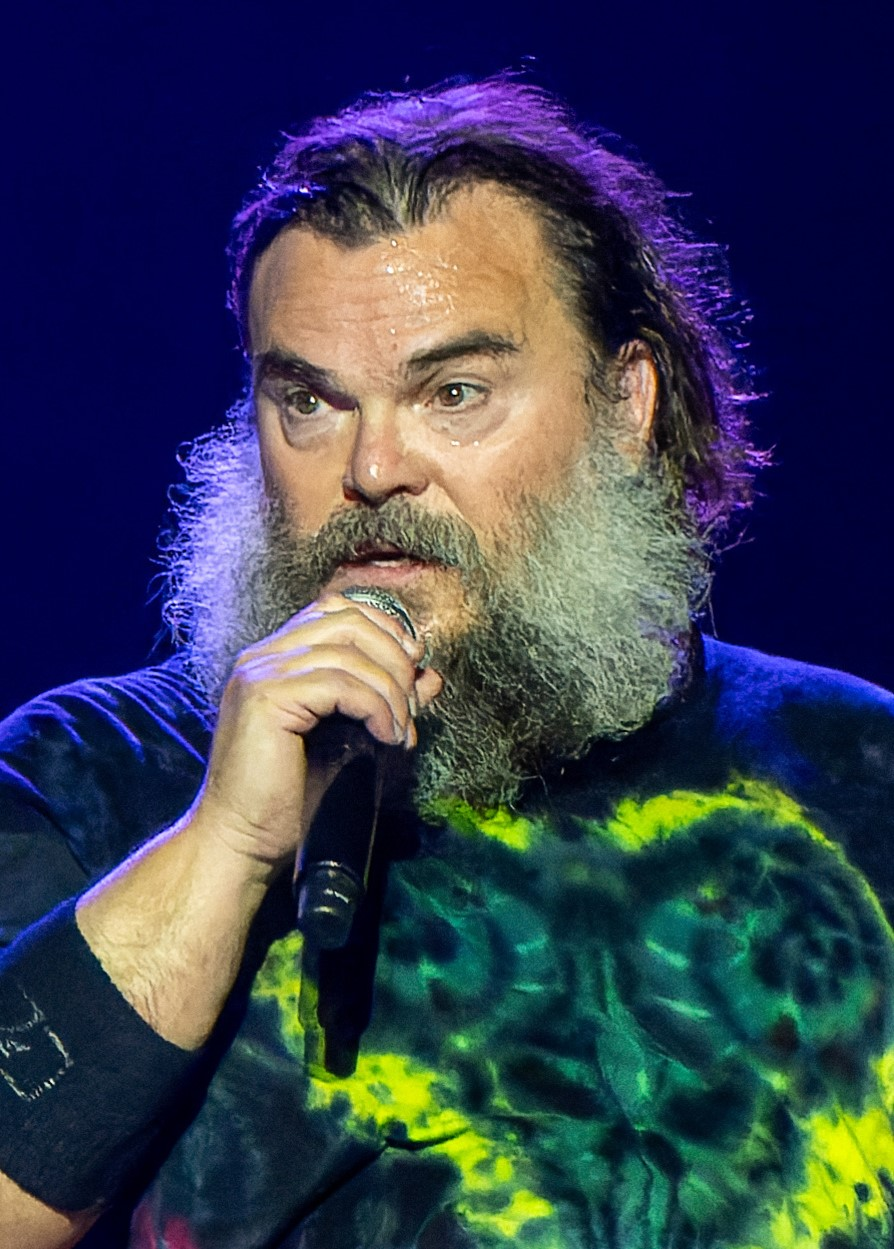
Jack Black

- August 1 – David Wain, comedian, writer, actor, and director
- August 2 – Cedric Ceballos, basketball player
- August 4 – Michael DeLuise, actor and director
- August 5
  - Halle Cioffi, tennis player
  - Kenny Irwin Jr., stock car racing driver (d. 2000)
- August 6
  - Jonathan Aibel, scriptwriter
  - Jennifer Lyon Bell, pornographic filmmaker
  - Mike Budenholzer, basketball coach
  - Jay Chaudhuri, politician
  - Elliott Smith, singer/songwriter (d. 2003)
- August 7
  - Travis Brown, cyclist
  - Todd Brunson, poker player
  - Keith Cash, football player
  - Kerry Cash, football player
  - Ron Christie, political strategist
- August 8 – Chris Beetem, actor
- August 9
  - Ephesians Bartley, football player
  - Andrew Cohen, politician and judge
  - Roy McGrath, politician and fugitive (d. 2023)
  - Troy Percival, baseball player
- August 10 – Tim Cantor, artist and writer
- August 12
  - Albert Castiglia, blues singer/songwriter and guitarist
  - Lincoln Coleman, football player
- August 13 – Rachel Carns, musician
- August 14
  - Reggie Barrett, football player
  - Holly A. Brady, judge
  - Tracy Caldwell Dyson, chemist and NASA astronaut
  - Preston Lacy, stunt performer, actor, and comedian
  - Chris Pérez, guitarist
- August 15
  - Dave Balza, basketball coach
  - Eric Bieniemy, football player and coach
  - Kevin Cheng, actor and singer
  - John Fetterman, politician, mayor of Braddock, Pennsylvania (2006-2019), and 34th Lieutenant Governor of Pennsylvania (2019-2023)
- August 16
  - Eric Beers, stock car racing driver
  - Michael Buckley, author
  - Ben Coates, football player
  - Kate Higgins, voice artist and pianist
  - Jase Robertson, television personality, businessman, and duck hunter
  - Paul Soter, actor, writer, and director
- August 17
  - David Bernhardt, lawyer and politician, 53rd United States Secretary of the Interior (2019-2021)
  - Tony Brooks, football player
  - Ivory Lee Brown, football player
  - Ed Cunningham, football player and sports announcer
  - Christian Laettner, basketball player
  - Donnie Wahlberg, singer and actor, member of New Kids on the Block
- August 18
  - Everlast, singer, rapper, and songwriter
  - Edward Norton, actor, director, screenwriter, and social activist
  - Christian Slater, actor, voice artist and producer
  - Timothy D. Snyder, historian
- August 19
  - Nate Dogg, rapper (d. 2011)
  - Doug Langdale, screenwriter, producer, and actor
  - Paula Jai Parker, actress and comedian
  - Matthew Perry, actor (d. 2023)
  - Patrick Van Horn, actor
  - Clay Walker, country singer
- August 21 – Jelani Cobb, writer, author, educator, and Dean of Columbia Journalism School
- August 22 – Jennifer Cohen, athletic director for USC
- August 23
  - Barry Bales, musician
  - Kari Lake, news anchor and political candidate
- August 26
  - Glenn Berger, scriptwriter
  - Ricky Bottalico, baseball player
  - Jerrod Sessler, stock car racing driver and political candidate
  - Adrian Young, drummer for No Doubt and Dreamcar
- August 27
  - Eric Bergoust, Olympic freestyle skier
  - Colt Ford, country rap musician
  - Suzie V. Freeman, producer and writer
  - Avril Haines, lawyer, Director of National Intelligence
- August 28
  - Jack Black, actor and musician, frontman for Tenacious D
  - Sheryl Sandberg, technology executive
- August 30
  - Lisa Cole Zimmerman, soccer player
  - Kent Osborne, actor and producer
- August 31
  - Evan Christopher, jazz clarinetist and composer
  - Mike Covone, soccer player
  - Neil Covone, soccer player
  - Andrew Cunanan, serial killer (d. 1997)
  - Jeff Russo, composer and guitarist for Tonic and Low Stars

=== September ===
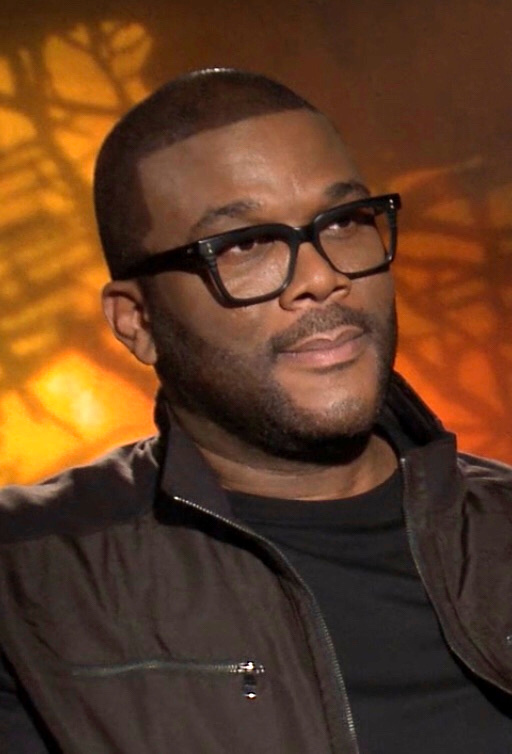
Tyler Perry

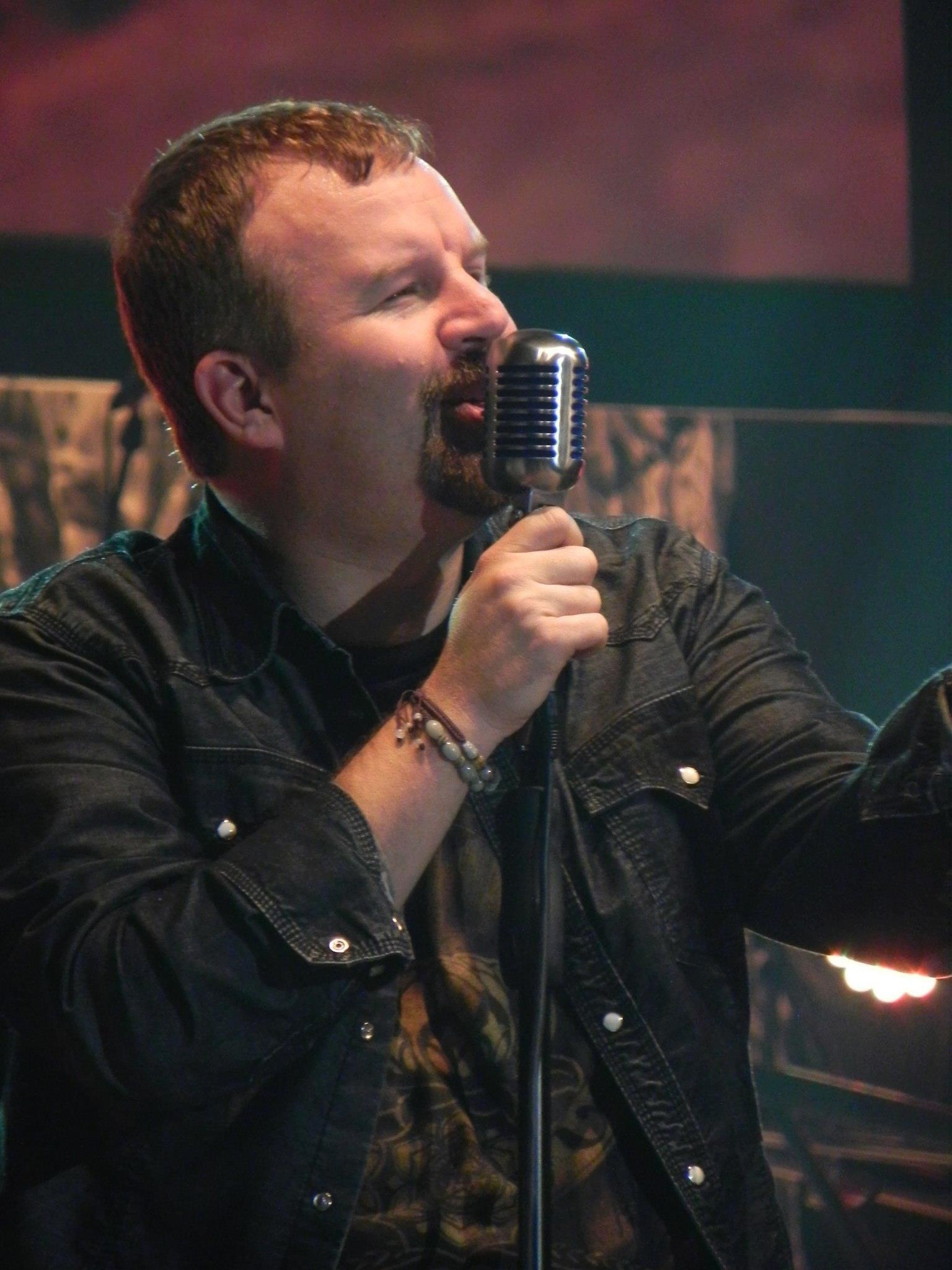
Mark Hall

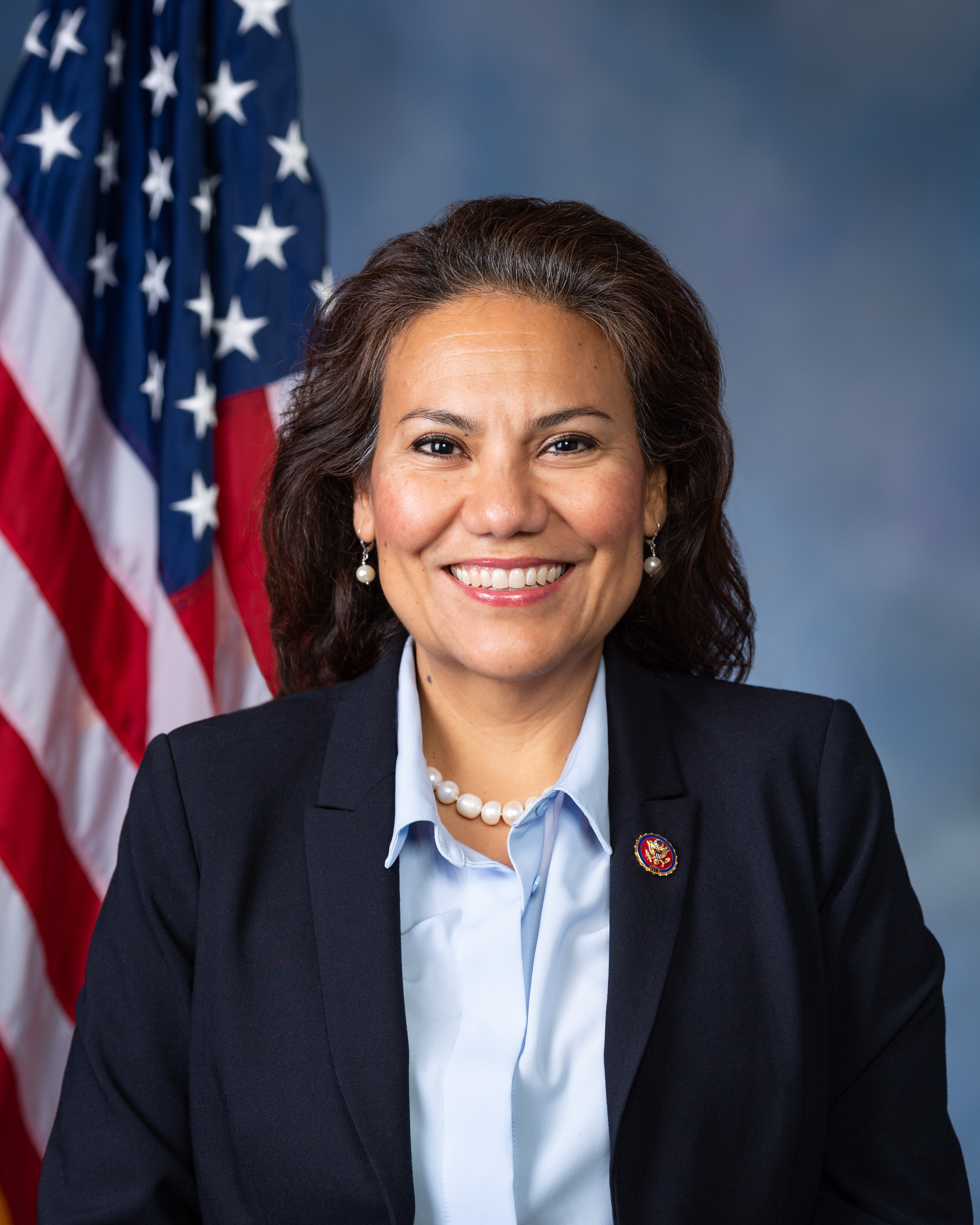
Veronica Escobar

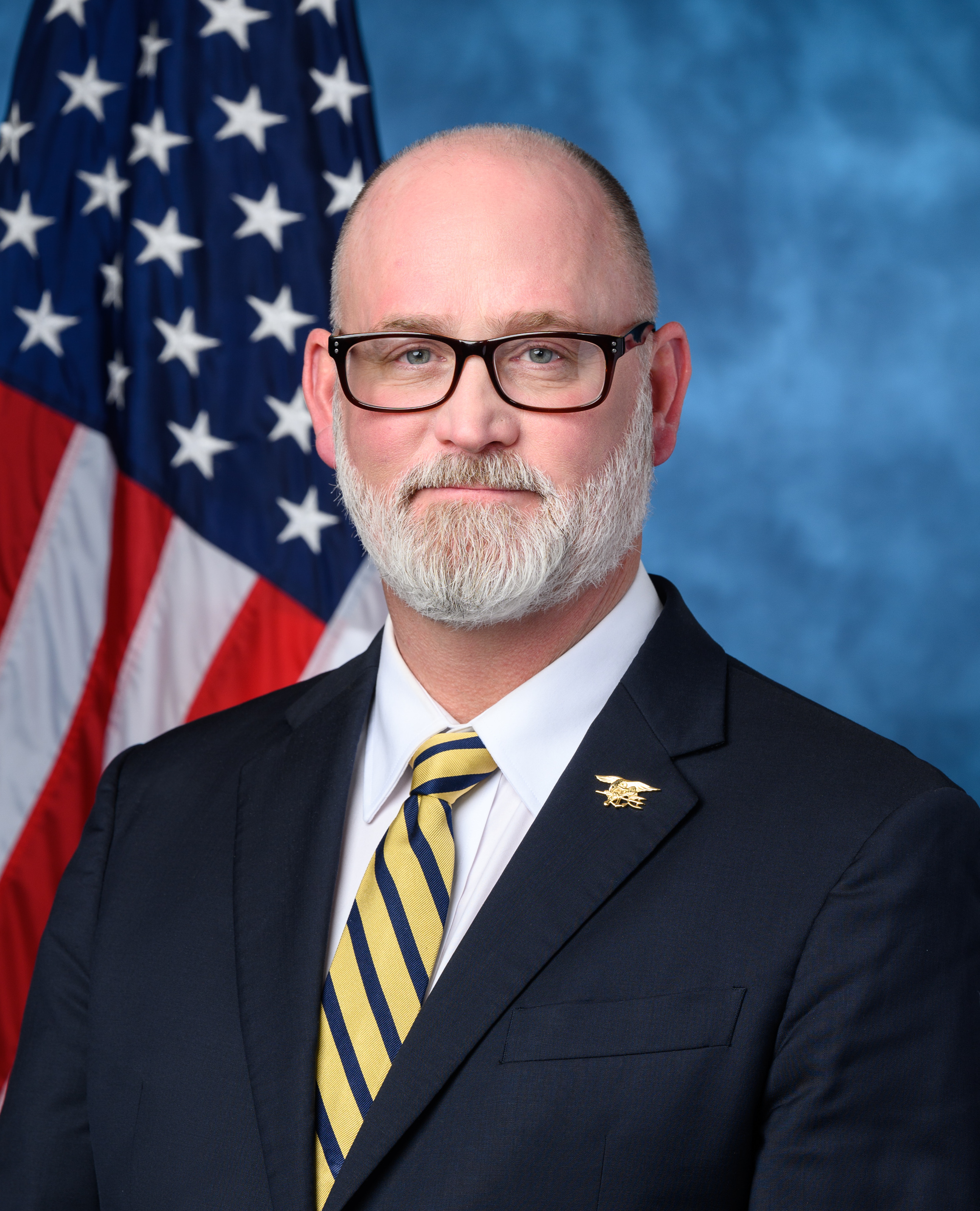
Derrick Van Orden

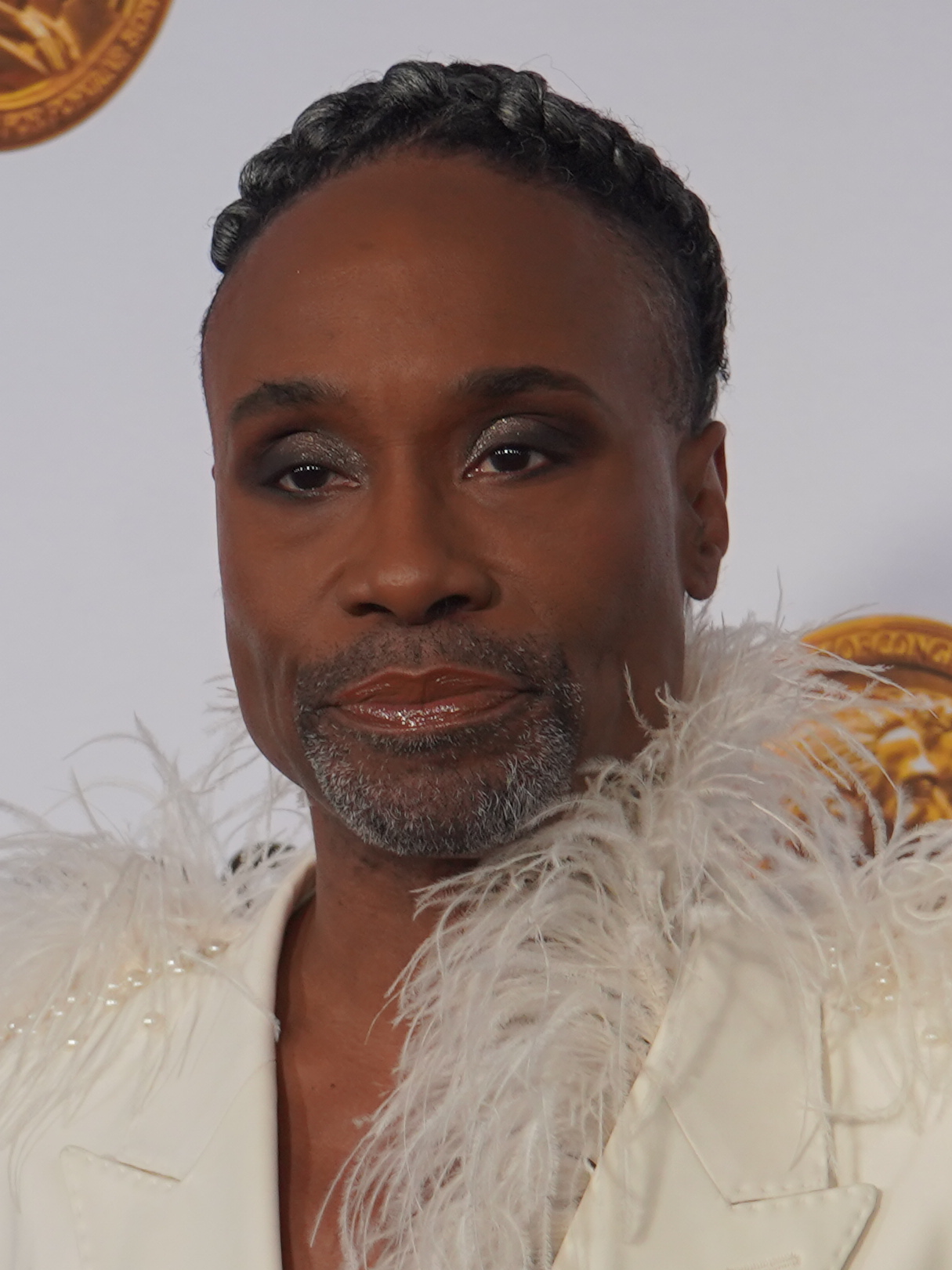
Billy Porter

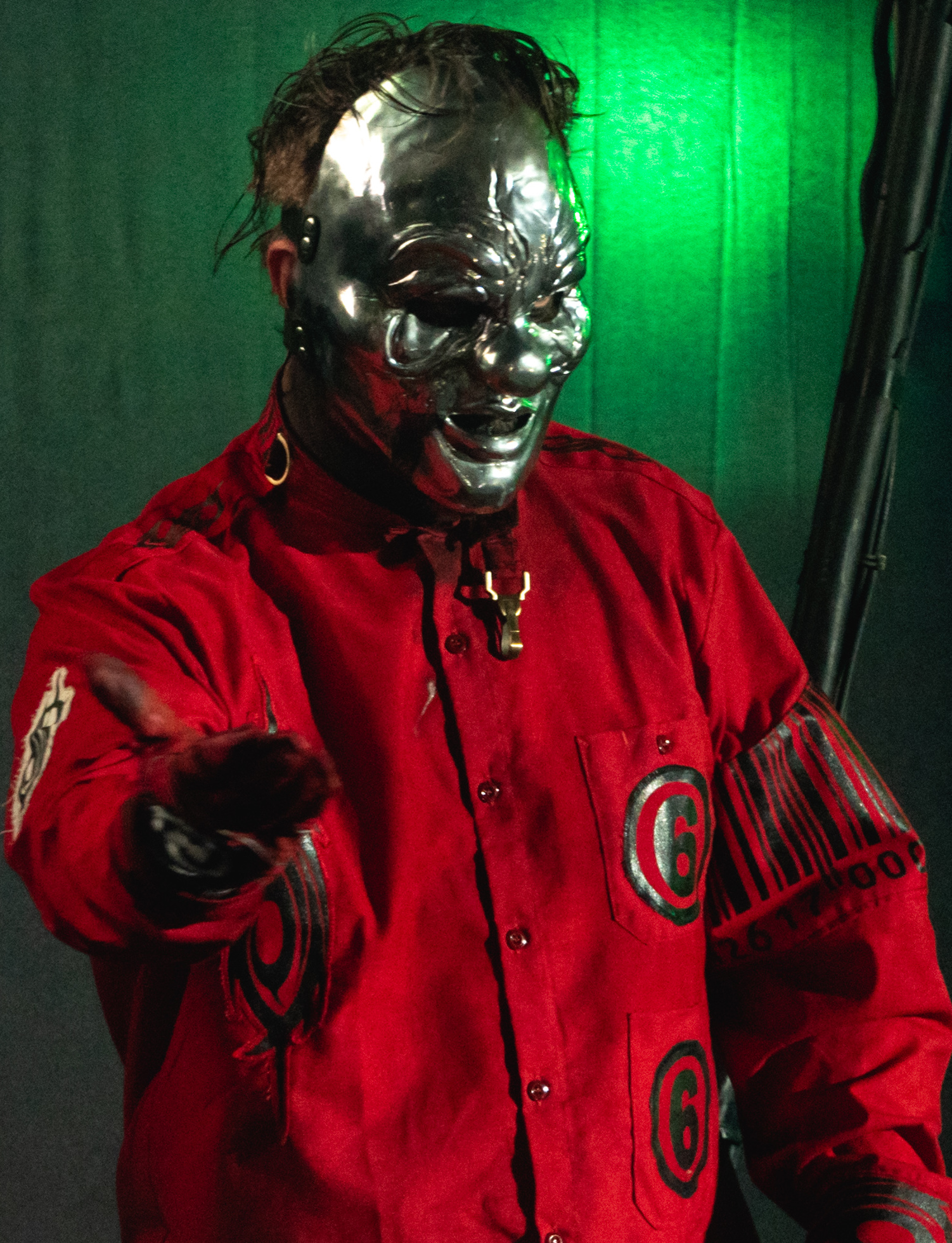
Shawn "Clown" Crahan

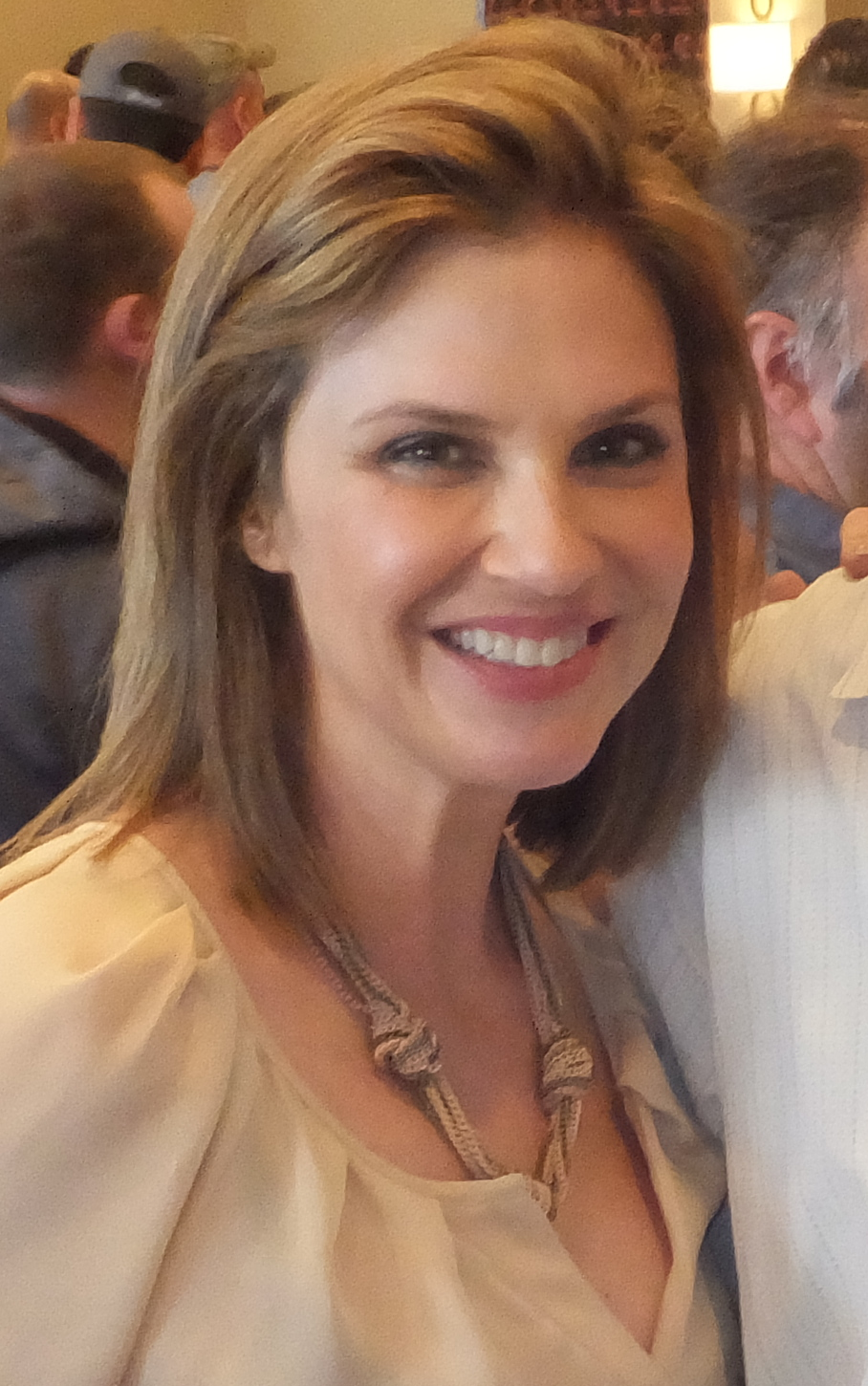
Megan Ward

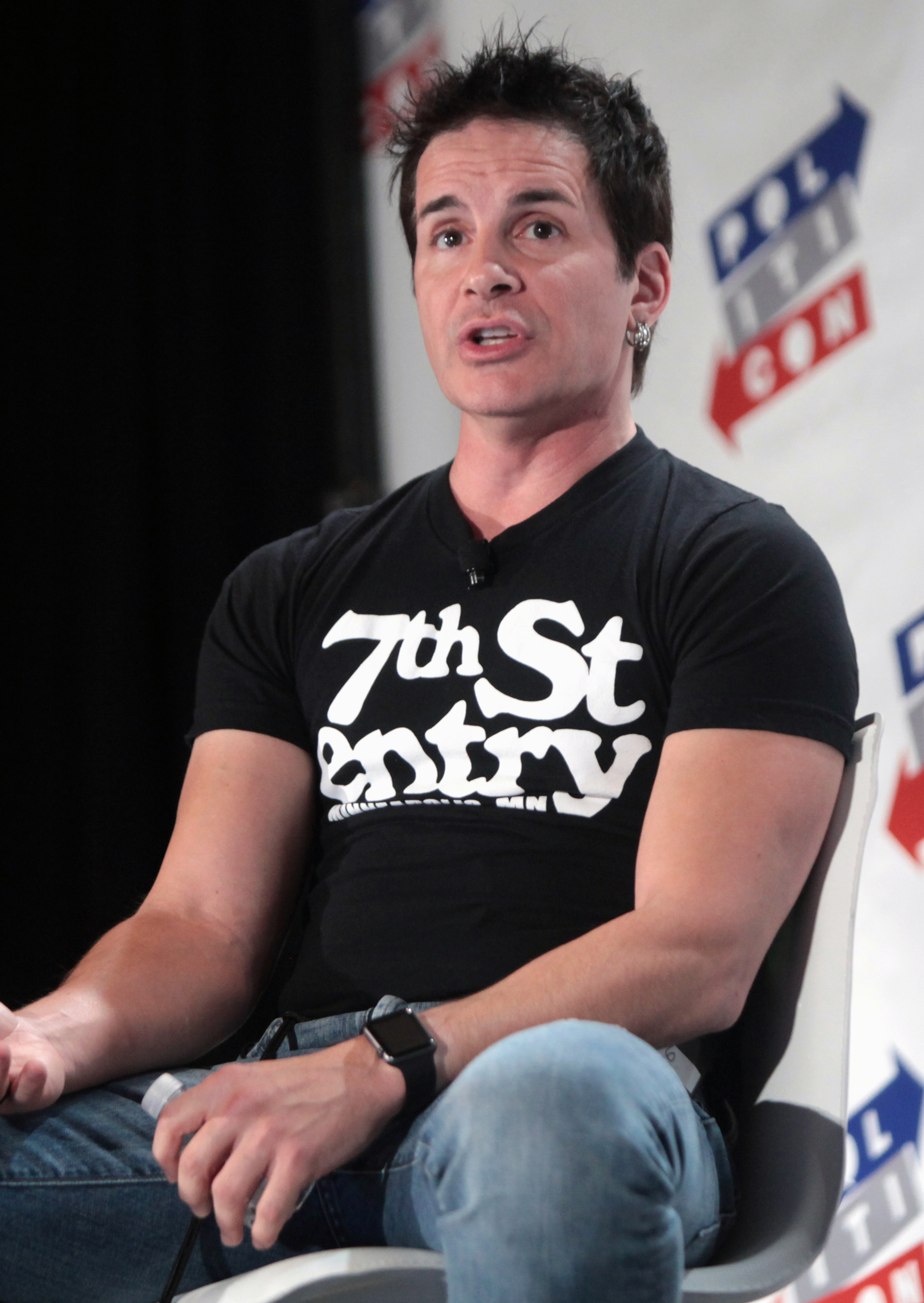
Hal Sparks

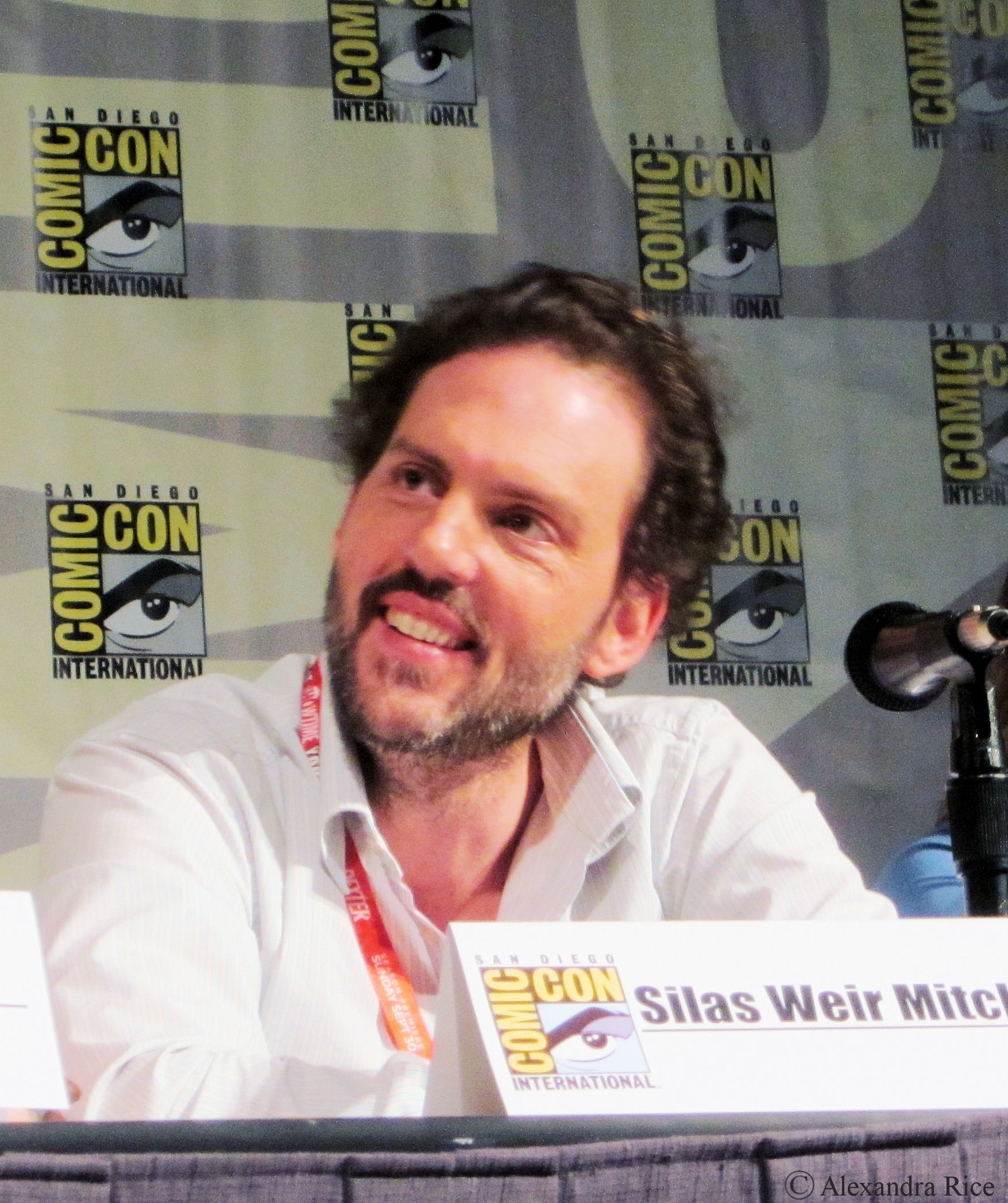
Silas Weir Mitchell

- September 1 – Alvin Brown, boxer
- September 2
  - Cedric "K-Ci" Hailey, R&B singer
  - Dave Naz, photographer
- September 3
  - Noah Baumbach, filmmaker
  - Sandra Birch, tennis player
  - Beth Combs, basketball coach
  - John Fugelsang, actor, comedian, writer, host, political commentator, and television personality
- September 4
  - Mo Brings Plenty, actor and musician
  - Stephen Buoniconti, politician
  - Kristen Wilson, actress
- September 5
  - Greg Collins, record producer
  - Dweezil Zappa, actor and musician
- September 6
  - Brian Barczyk, YouTuber and reptile enthusiast (d. 2024)
  - Kevin Carroll, actor
  - CeCe Peniston, singer
- September 7
  - David Blitzer, investor and sports team owner
  - Darren Bragg, baseball player
  - Brent Cookson, baseball player
  - Angie Everhart, actress and model
  - Diane Farr, actress
  - Jimmy Urine, electropunk singer
  - N'Bushe Wright, actress and dancer
- September 8 – Justin Chin, Malaysian-born poet (d. 2015)
- September 9 – Christine Collins, Olympic rower
- September 10 – Ed Cooley, basketball player and coach
- September 11
  - Steve Bellone, politician
  - Crystal Lewis, Christian musician
- September 12
  - Max Boot, Russian-born author and historian
  - Boss, rapper (d. 2024)
  - Troy Cline, stock car racing driver
- September 13
  - Dominic Fumusa, actor
  - Tyler Perry, actor, director, and screenwriter
- September 14 – Mark Hall, Christian singer and frontman for Casting Crowns
- September 15
  - Twinkle Borge, activist (d. 2024)
  - Gareth Cook, journalist and book editor
  - Veronica Escobar, politician
  - Derrick Van Orden, Navy SEAL and politician
- September 16
  - Monica Bascio, Paralympic cross-country skier, biathlete, and handcyclist
  - Tommy Cloce, stock car racing driver
- September 17
  - Bobby Christine, attorney and judge
  - Matthew Settle, actor
- September 18 – Cappadonna, rapper
- September 19
  - Fabrizio Brienza, Italian-born model and actor
  - Shannen W. Coffin, attorney
  - Michael Symon, chef and television personality
- September 20
  - Matthew Brouillette, businessman and entrepreneur
  - John B. Callahan, politician, mayor of Bethlehem, Pennsylvania (2004-2014)
  - Tom Cullerton, politician
- September 21
  - Anne Burrell, chef and television personality (d. 2025)
  - Jason Christiansen, baseball player
  - Billy Porter, actor and singer
- September 22
  - Jeff Barry, baseball player
  - Mark Brisker, American-born Israeli basketball player
- September 23
  - Jeff Cirillo, baseball player
  - Beth Saulnier, writer and editor
- September 24
  - Chad Beguelin, playwright and lyricist
  - Chilly Willy, wrestler
  - Shawn "Clown" Crahan, rock percussionist for Slipknot
  - DeVante Swing, music producer
  - Megan Ward, actress
- September 25
  - David Branshaw, golfer
  - Bill Simmons, sports columnist
  - Hal Sparks, actor, writer, comedian, and political commentator
- September 26 – David Berri, University professor and sports economist
- September 27 – Andrew Carroll, author, editor, playwright, public speaker, nonprofit executive, and historian
- September 28
  - Manuel Benitez, actor and murderer (d. 2008)
  - Kerri Chandler, DJ and record producer
  - Karen Fairchild, country singer/songwriter
- September 29
  - Allison Brennan, writer
  - O. J. Brigance, football player (d. 2026)
  - Erika Eleniak, American-born Canadian model and actress
- September 30
  - Julianna Baggott, University professor and novelist
  - John Carney, politician (d. 2021)
  - Silas Weir Mitchell, actor
  - Chris Von Erich, wrestler (d. 1991)

=== October ===
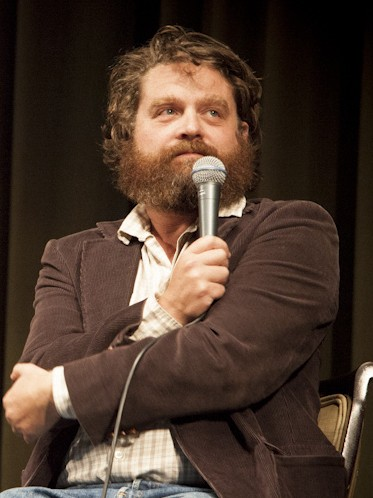
Zach Galifianakis

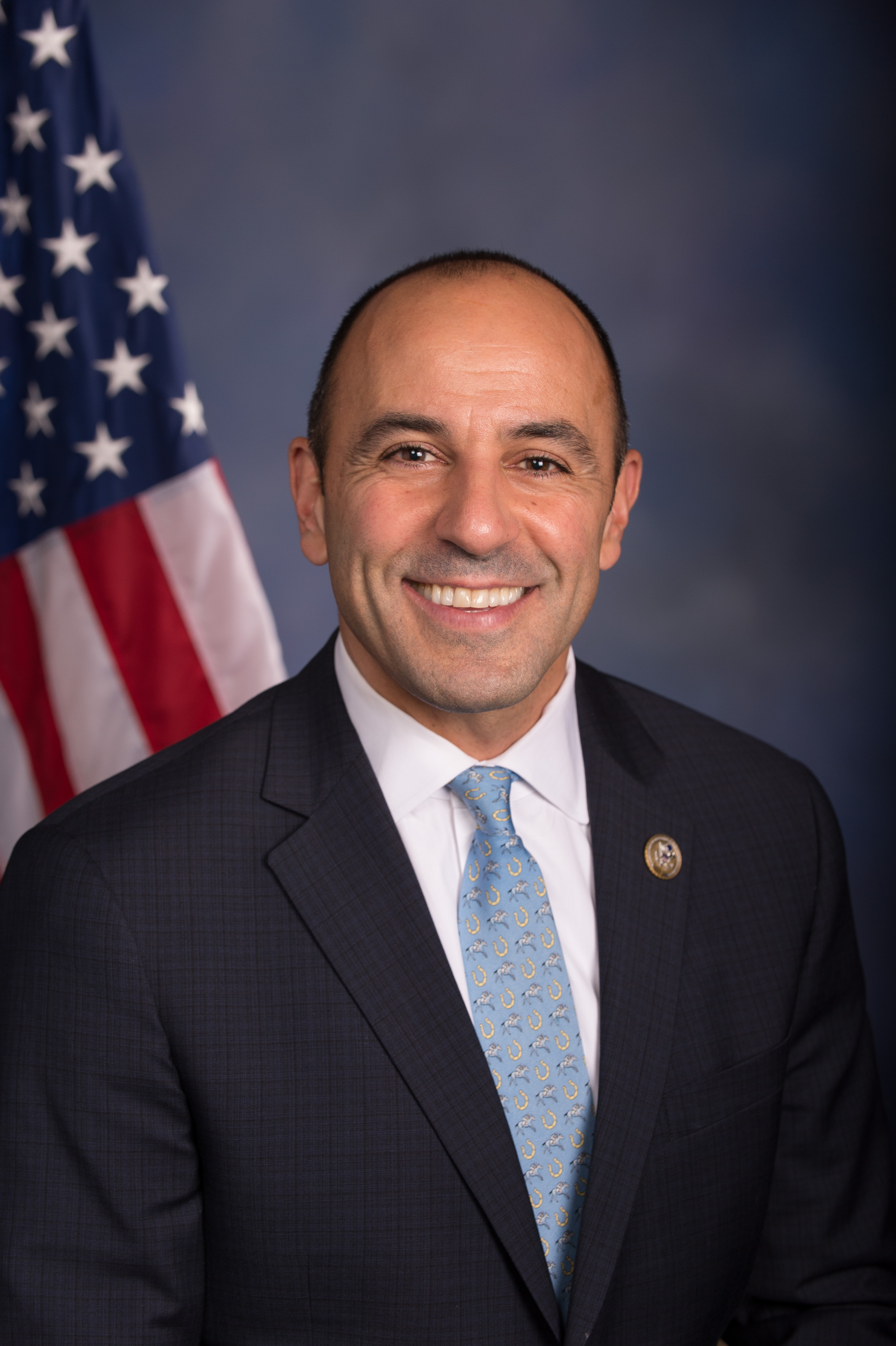
Jimmy Panetta

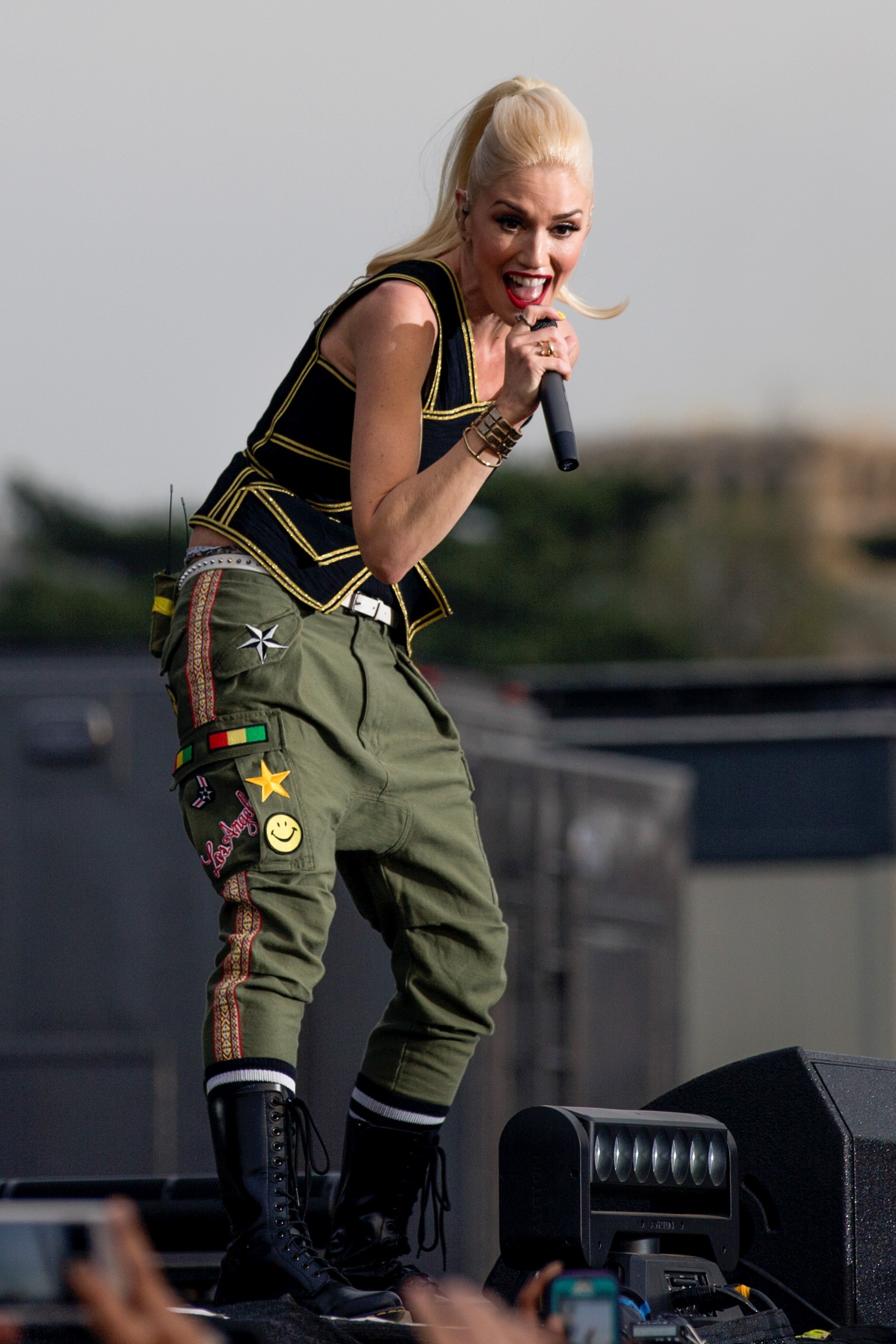
Gwen Stefani

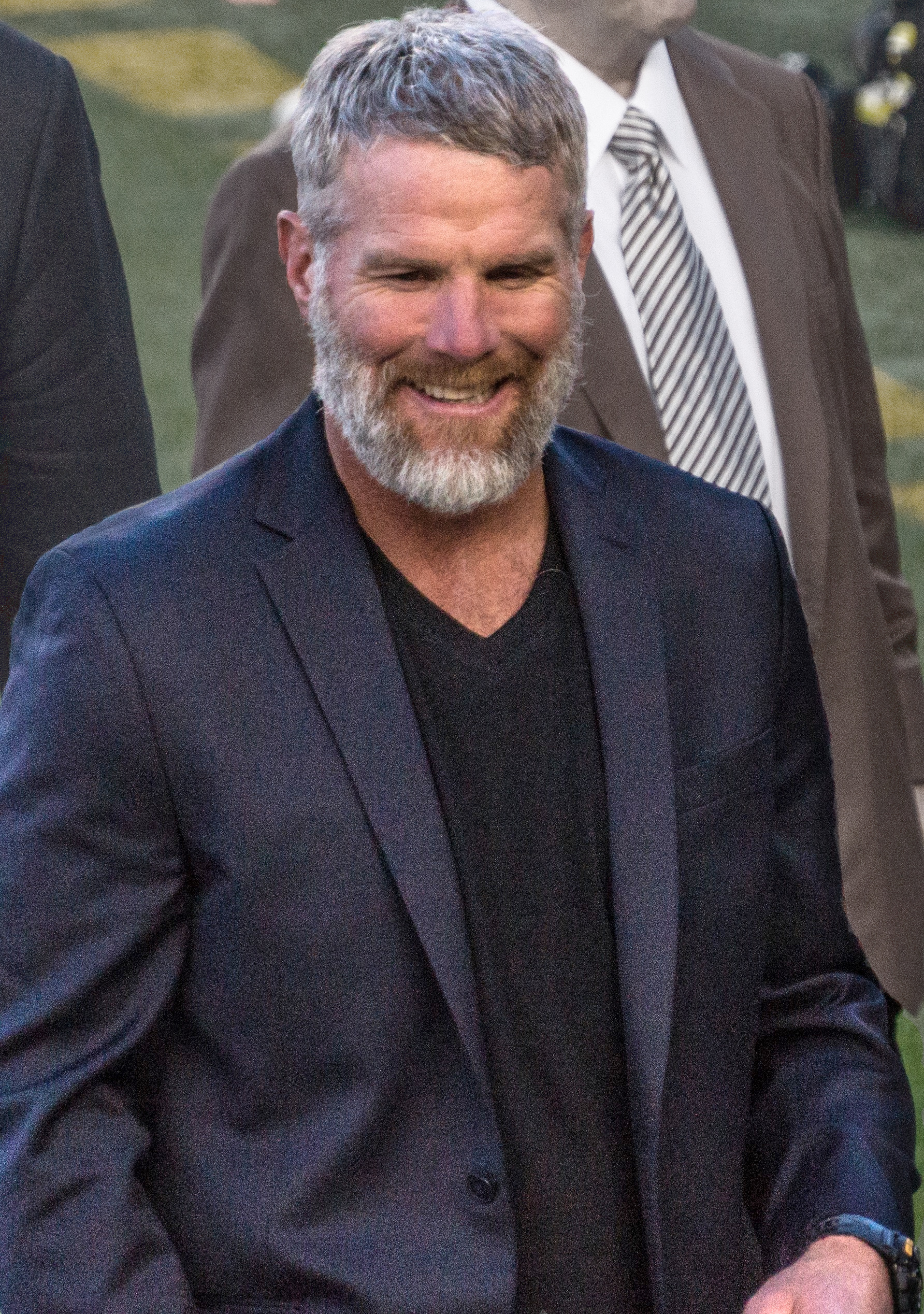
Brett Favre

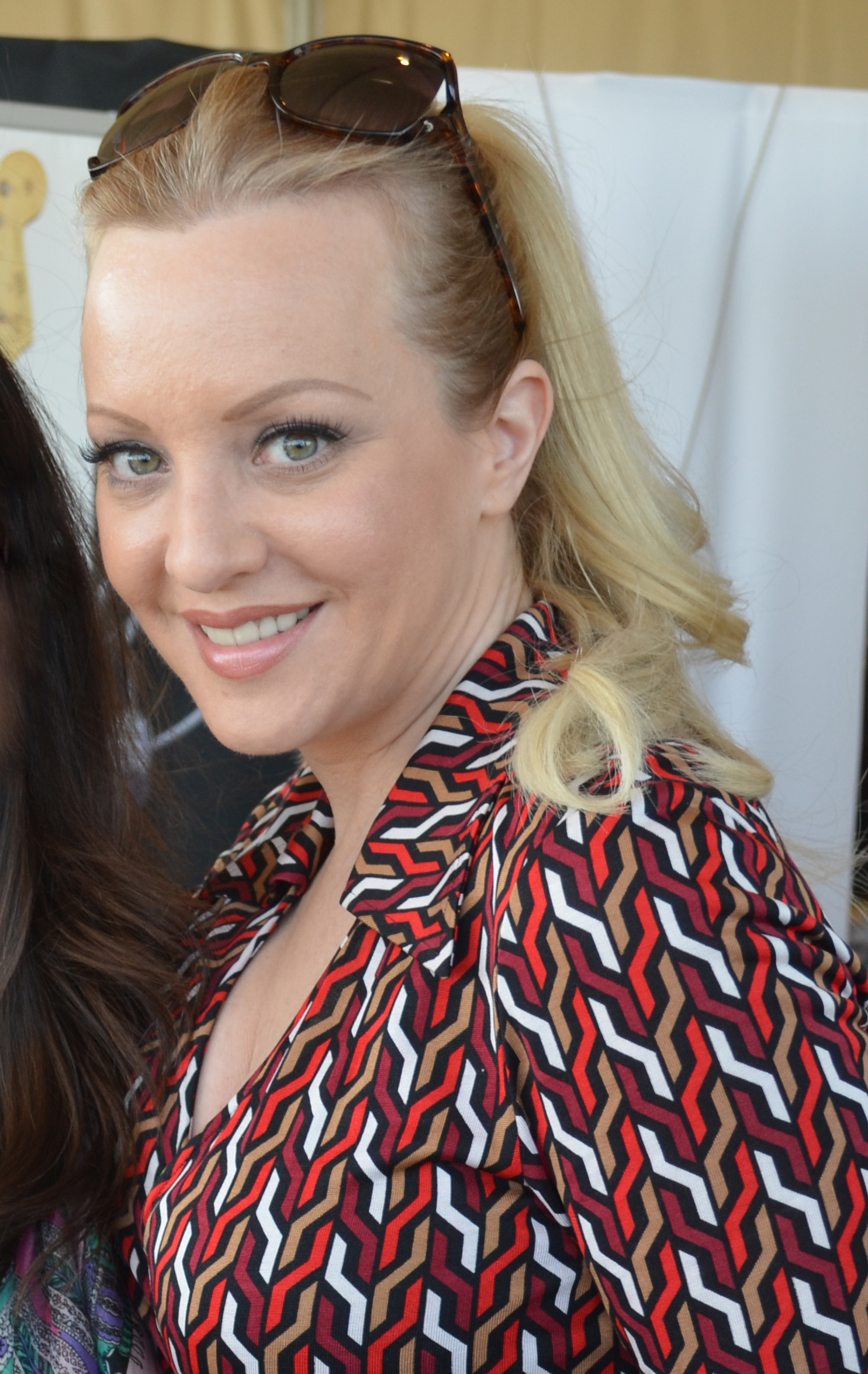
Wendi McLendon-Covey

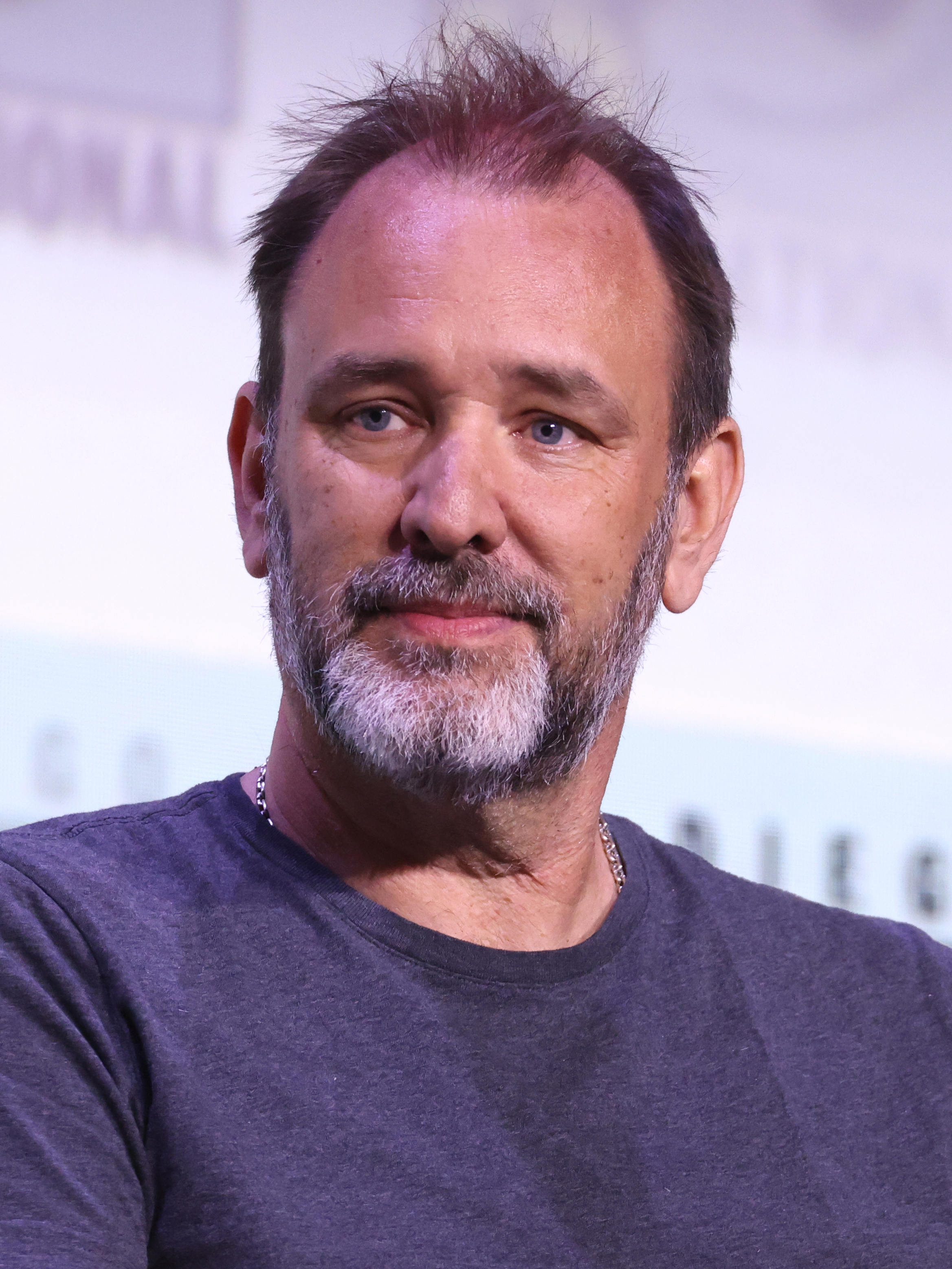
Trey Parker

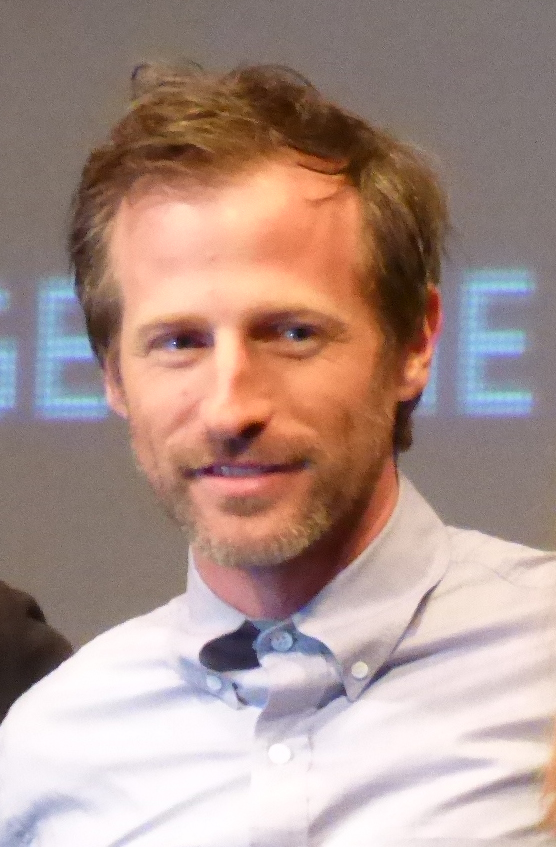
Spike Jonze

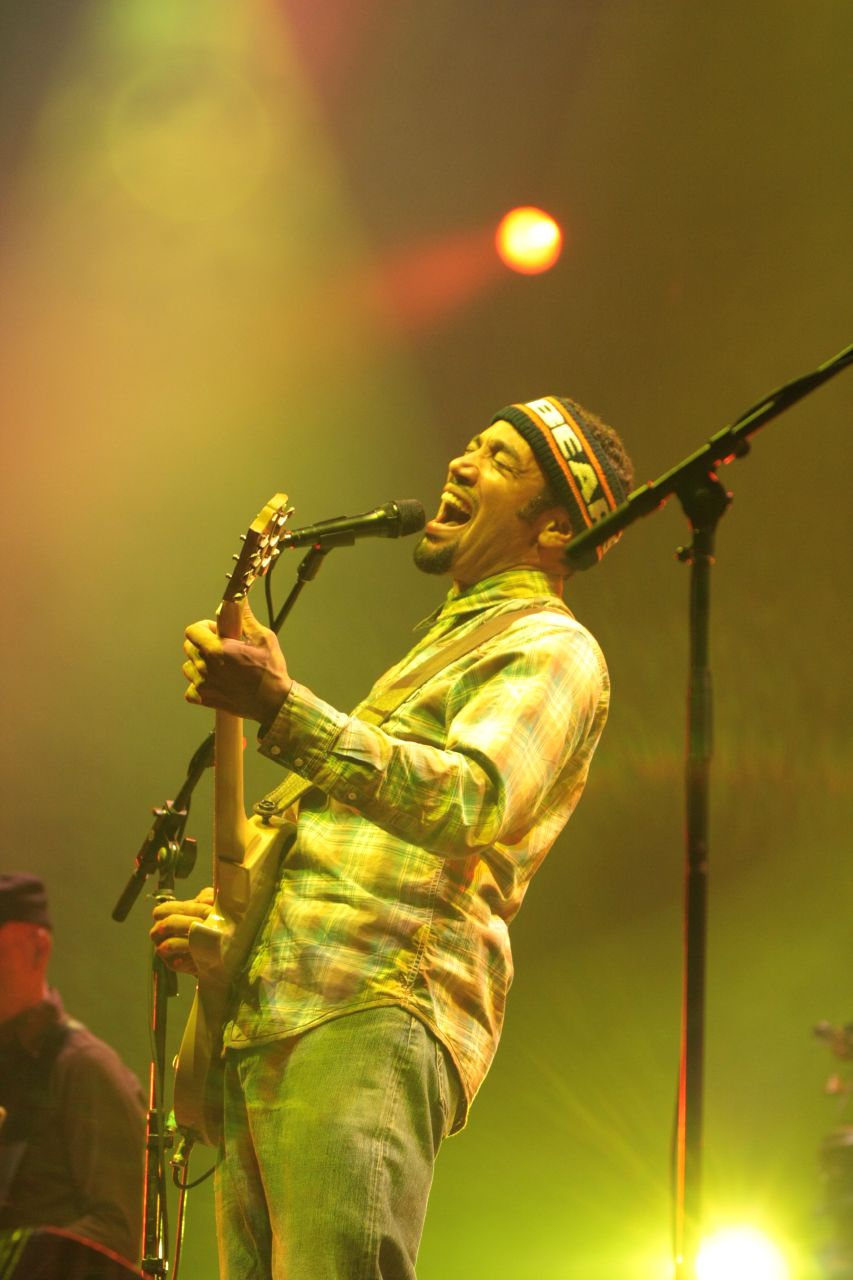
Ben Harper

- October 1
  - Jamie Bryant, football player and coach
  - Zach Galifianakis, actor and stand-up comedian
  - Jimmy Panetta, politician
- October 2
  - Dan Barber, chef
  - Eddie Brown, football player and coach
  - Mitch English, actor and television host
- October 3 – Gwen Stefani, singer, actress, and television host, lead singer for No Doubt
- October 4
  - Abraham Benrubi, actor
  - Gil Cates Jr., actor, producer, and director
- October 5
  - Salvatore Babones, sociologist
  - Brian Benczkowski, lawyer and politician
  - John Boccieri, politician
  - Jim Cox, politician
- October 7
  - Bobbie Brown, actress, model, and beauty pageant contestant
  - Karen L. Nyberg, space engineer and astronaut
  - DJ Qbert, turntablist
- October 8
  - Julia Ann, pornographic actress
  - Joe Baca Jr., politician
  - Bob D'Amico, drummer
  - Jeremy Davies, actor
- October 10
  - Loren Bouchard, voice artist, animator, and producer
  - Grady Champion, blues singer/songwriter, guitarist, and harmonicist
  - Benjamin Crump, civil rights lawyer
  - Brett Favre, football player
  - Molly Kiely, cartoonist
  - Wendi McLendon-Covey, actress
- October 11 – Ty Murray, bull rider
- October 12
  - Kevin Brooks, basketball player and coach
  - David Collins, Olympic rower
- October 13
  - Rhett Akins, country singer
  - Scott Beason, radio host and politician
  - Artt Butler, voice actor
  - Tim Crabtree, baseball player
  - Nancy Kerrigan, figure skater
  - Cady McClain, actress and director
- October 14
  - P. J. Brown, basketball player
  - Tim Burroughs, basketball player
  - David Strickland, screen actor (d. 1999)
- October 15
  - J. J. Blair, musical engineer, producer, and musician
  - Bill Burke, middle-distance runner
  - Kim Raver, actress
- October 16
  - Stephanie Best, middle-distance runner
  - Charles Brewer, boxer
  - Robert Cahaly, pollster and founder of the Trafalgar Group
  - Roy Hargrove, jazz trumpeter (d. 2018)
  - Wendy Wilson, singer and television personality
- October 17
  - Tony Barton, high jumper
  - Theodore D. Chuang, judge
  - John Collins, artistic director
  - Joe Courtney, basketball player
  - Wood Harris, actor
  - Nancy Sullivan, actress
- October 18 – Baby Bash, rapper
- October 19
  - Vanessa Marshall, actress and voice artist
  - Trey Parker, voice artist, comedian, screenwriter, composer, director, and producer
- October 20
  - Carole Crist, businesswoman
  - Juan González, baseball player
- October 21
  - Derrick Carter, DJ and record producer
  - David Phelps, Christian music vocalist, songwriter, and vocal arranger
- October 22
  - Dominic Black, wrestler
  - Spike Jonze, filmmaker
- October 23
  - Reggie Barnes, football player
  - Roger Carter, stock car racing driver
  - Sanjay Gupta, neurosurgeon and medical reporter
- October 24
  - Brian Boyer, basketball coach
  - Monica Brown, author
  - Christina Chambers, actress and model
- October 25
  - Samantha Bee, Canadian-born comedian, writer, producer, political commentator, actress, and host
  - Cecil Castellucci, American-born Canadian novelist
  - Charles R. Chamberlain, political leader, executive director for Democracy for America
  - Nika Futterman, actress and voice artist
  - Alex Webster, death metal bassist
- October 27
  - Murali Coryell, blues guitarist and singer
  - Jun Pino, artist and photographer
- October 28
  - Kirk Bullinger, baseball player
  - Ben Harper, singer/songwriter
- October 29 – Peter Breen, Olympic figure skater
- October 31
  - Terry Boyd, basketball player
  - Ash Brannon, writer, director, visual artist, animator, and producer
  - Tim Chisholm, tennis player
  - David Coburn, actor

=== November ===
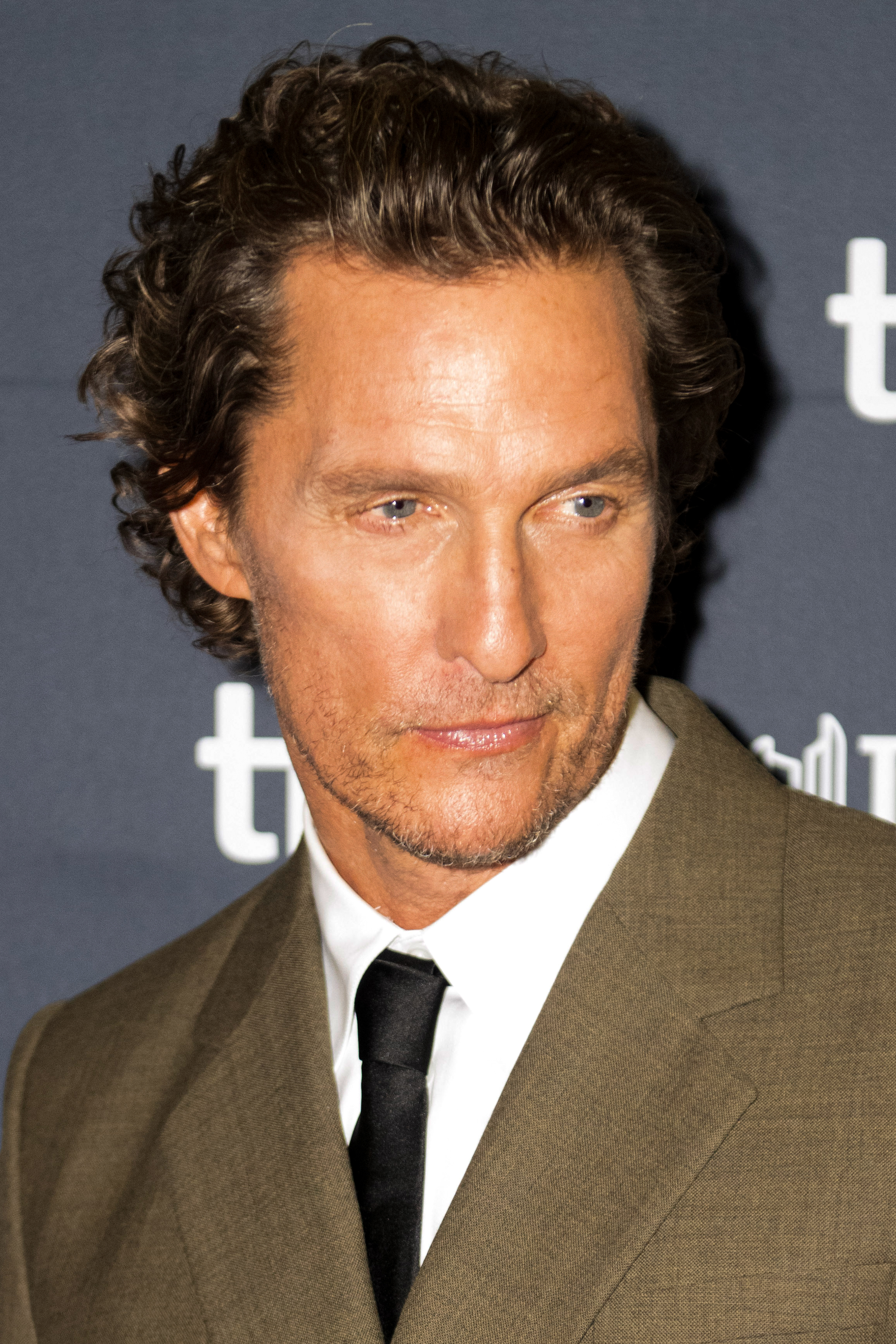
Matthew McConaughey

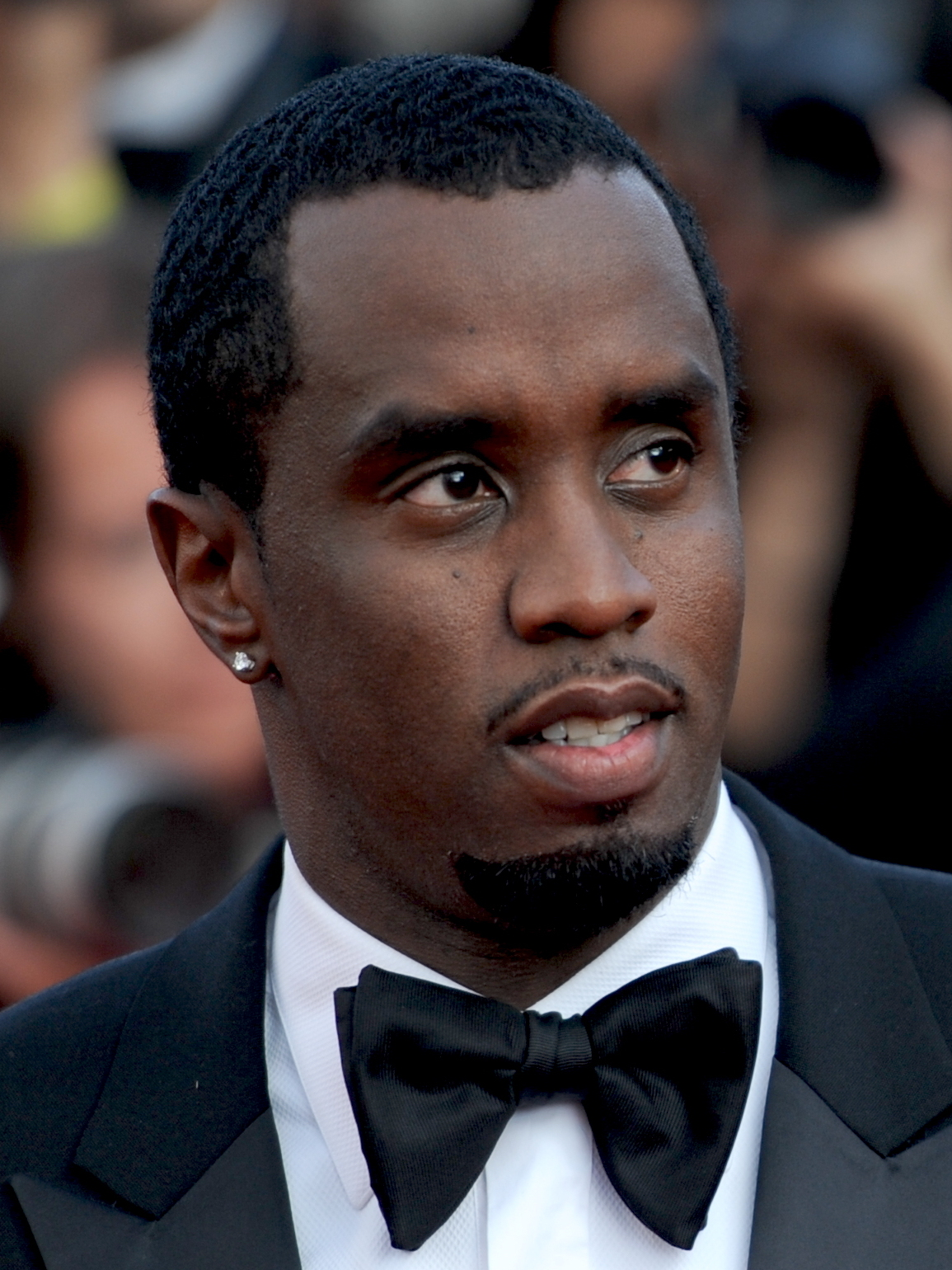
Sean Combs

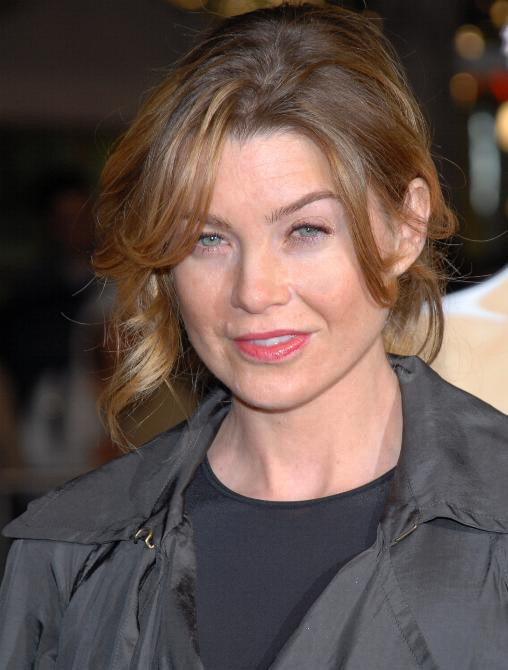
Ellen Pompeo

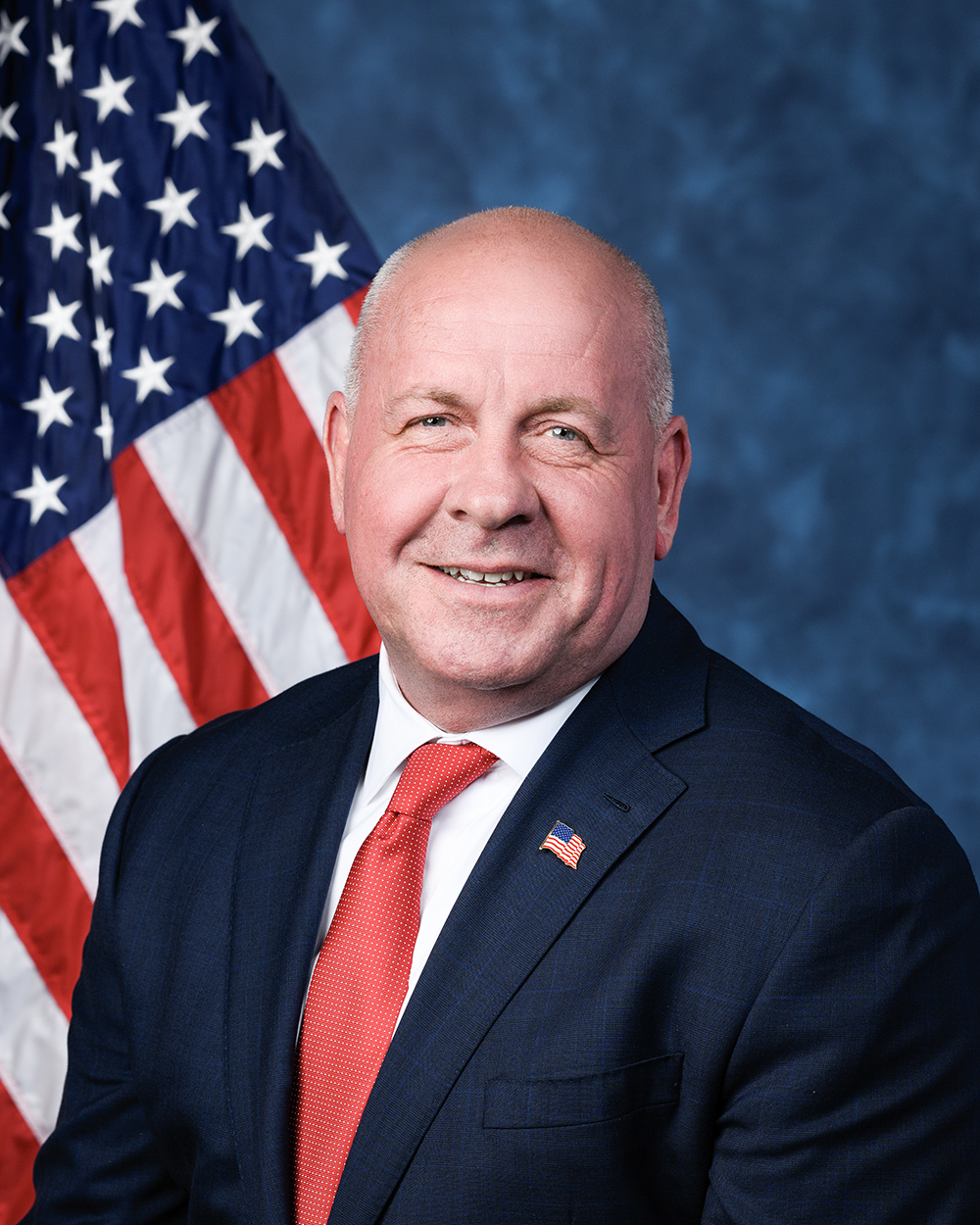
David Taylor

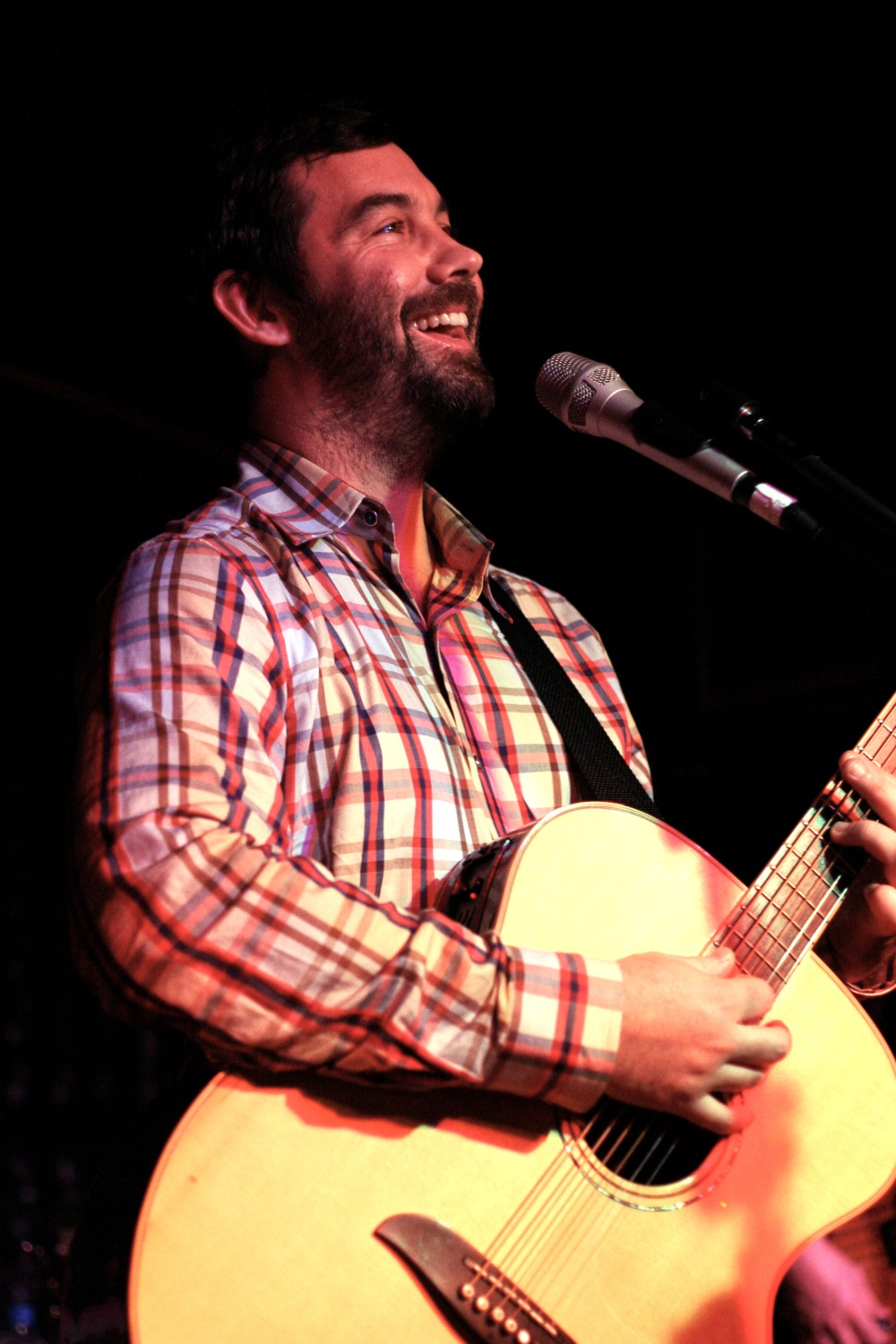
Duncan Sheik

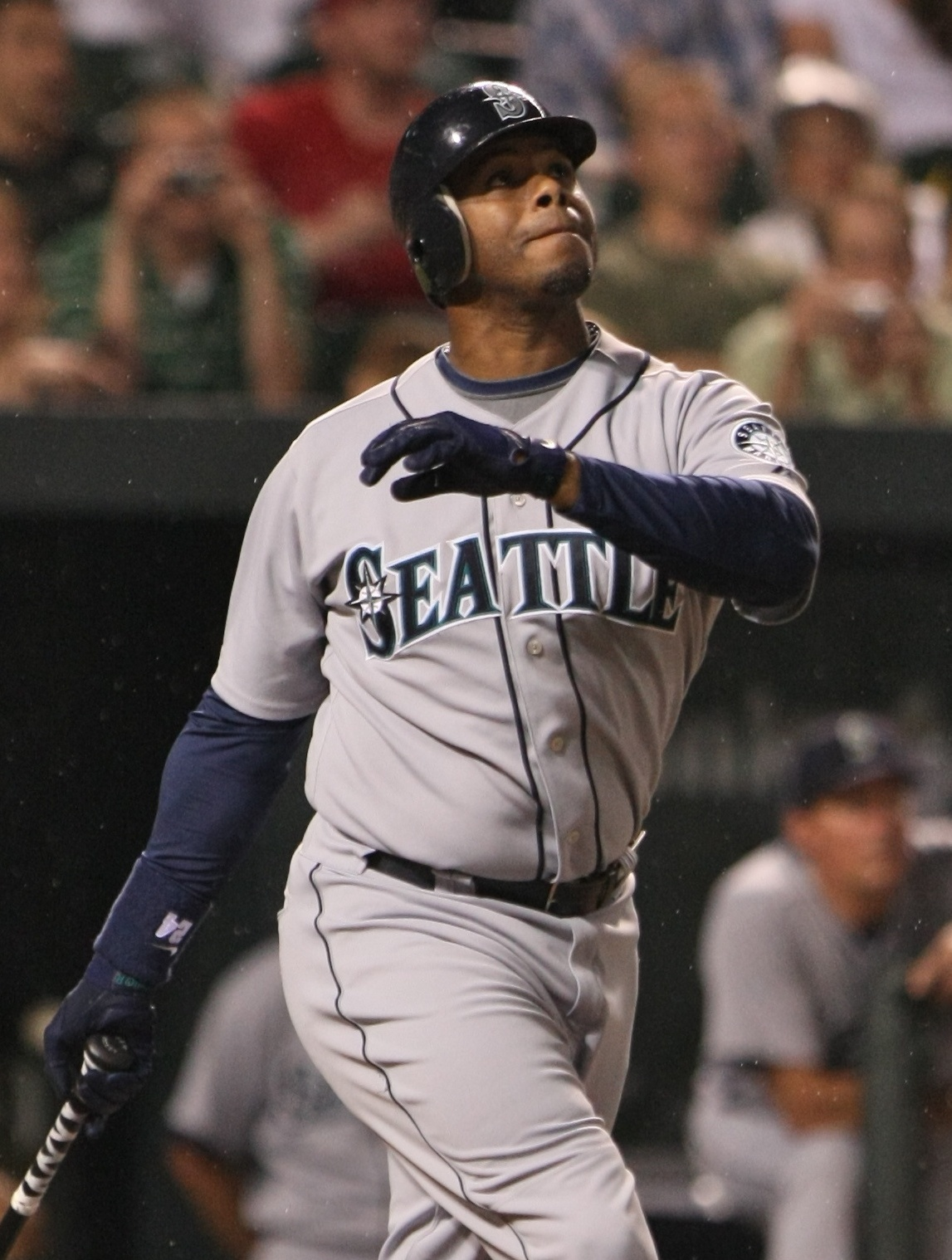
Ken Griffey Jr.

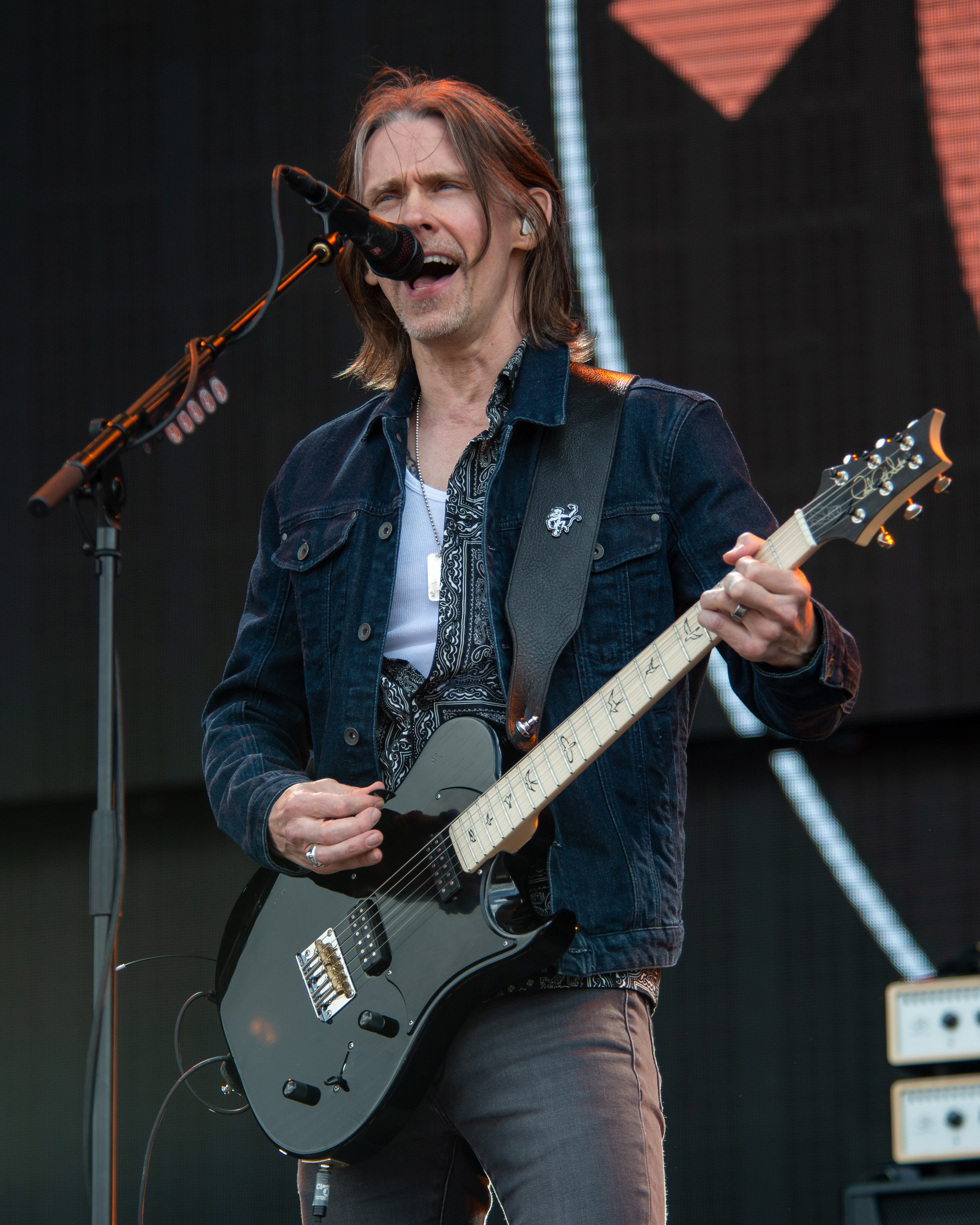
Myles Kennedy

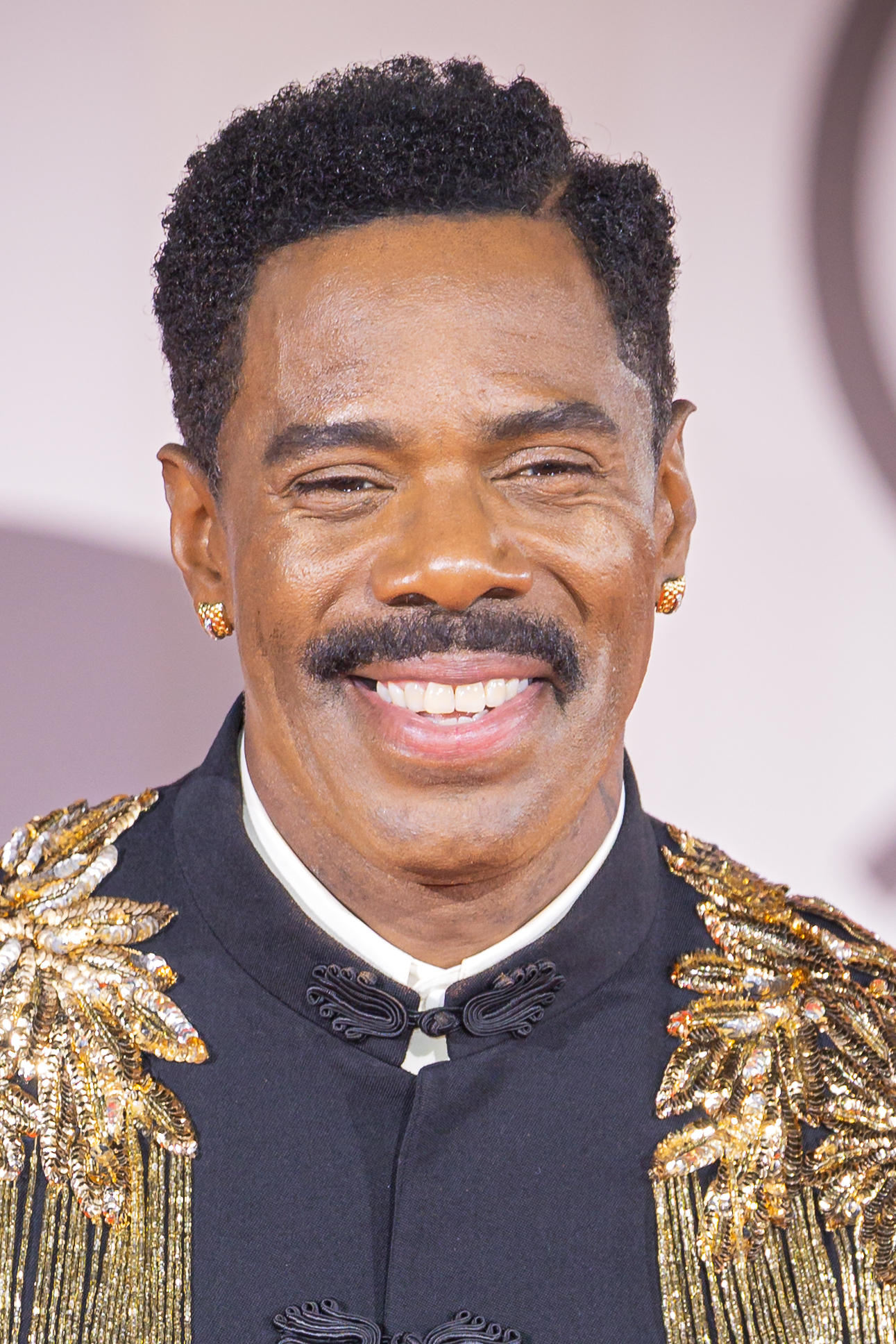
Colman Domingo

Chris Weitz

- November 1
  - Gary Alexander, basketball player
  - Michael Benjamin, investor
  - Ron Clark, sprinter
- November 2 – Reginald Arvizu, a metal bassist for Stillwell
- November 3 – Myron Brown, basketball player
- November 4
  - Trevor Blackwell, Canadian-born computer programmer, engineer, entrepreneur, and roboticist
  - Doug Boehm, record producer and sound engineer
  - Jimmy Carruth, basketball player
  - Sean Combs, rapper and entrepreneur
  - Matthew McConaughey, actor
- November 5
  - Mark Batterson, pastor and author
  - Deanna Bowen, American-born Canadian artist
  - Mark Calvi, basketball player and coach
- November 7 – Michelle Clunie, actress and ballerina
- November 8
  - Stephanie M. Carlson, developmental psychologist
  - Jason Couch, bowler
  - Jonathan Slavin, actor and activist
- November 9
  - Sandra Denton, rapper
  - Allison Wolfe, punk rock singer/songwriter
- November 10
  - Jennifer Cody, actress and dancer
  - Peter Craig, novelist and screenwriter
  - Ellen Pompeo, actress
- November 11 – Mark Baker, basketball player and coach
- November 12
  - Ian Bremmer, political scientist
  - Rob Schrab, actor and comic book creator
- November 13
  - John Belluso, dramatist (d. 2006)
  - Lori Berenson, terrorist
  - Beth Bernstein, politician
  - Bob Bicknell, football player and coach
  - Stephen Full, actor and comedian
  - Josh Mancell, composer and instrumentalist
- November 14
  - Daniel Abraham, novelist, author, screenwriter, and producer
  - Chad Blinman, music producer
  - Joseph Cella, diplomat and political advisor
  - Butch Walker, musician
- November 15 – Matt Brown, politician
- November 16 – David Taylor, politician
- November 17
  - Roxanne Beckford, Jamaican-born actress
  - David Bell, author
- November 18
  - Dan Bakkedahl, actor and comedian
  - Phil Buckman, musician and actor, bassist for Filter and Fuel
  - Demetrius Calip, basketball player (d. 2023)
  - Sam Cassell, basketball player and coach
  - Rocket Ismail, football player
  - Duncan Sheik, singer/songwriter, guitarist, and actor
- November 19
  - Erika Alexander, actress
  - Arthur Bradford, writer and filmmaker
- November 20
  - Dabo Swinney, football coach
  - Meredith Whitney, business executive
- November 21 – Ken Griffey Jr., baseball player
- November 22
  - Justin Constantine, Marine Lieutenant Colonel
  - Tony Palermo, drummer
- November 23
  - Doug Brady, baseball player
  - Blaise Bryant, football player
- November 26
  - KC Crosbie, politician
  - Kara Walker, artist
- November 27
  - Vince Chhabria, judge
  - Myles Kennedy, singer/songwriter and guitarist, frontman for Alter Bridge
  - Elizabeth Marvel, actress
- November 28
  - Michelle Beckley, politician
  - Dale Carter, football player
  - Colman Domingo, actor and dramatist
  - Lexington Steele, pornographic actor and director
- November 29
  - Chris Baker, race car driver
  - Jennifer Elise Cox, actress
  - Kasey Keller, soccer player
  - Mariano Rivera, Panamanian-born baseball player
- November 30
  - David Auburn, dramatist
  - Larry Brown, football player
  - Chris Weitz, director, screenwriter, producer, and actor

=== December ===
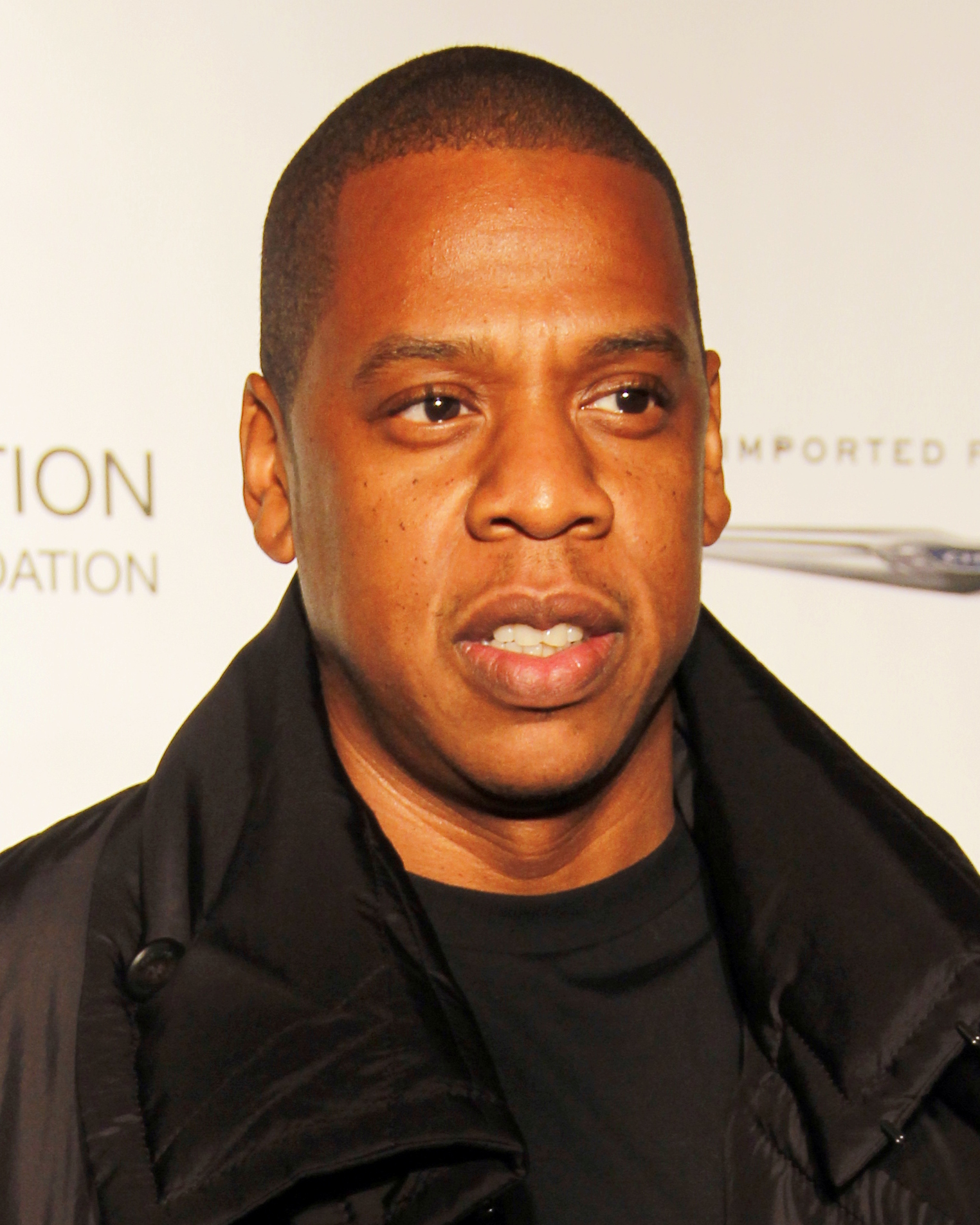
Jay-Z

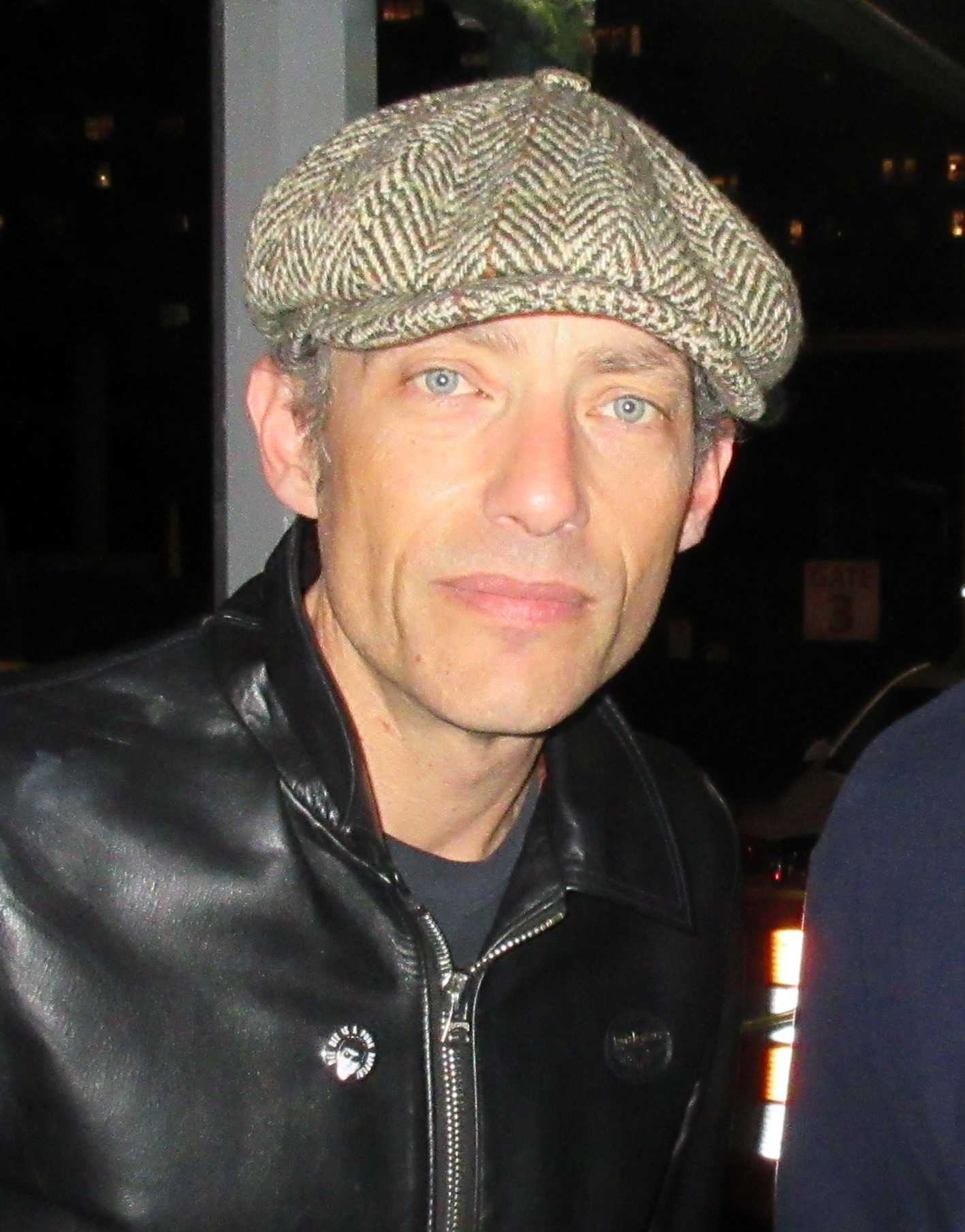
Jakob Dylan

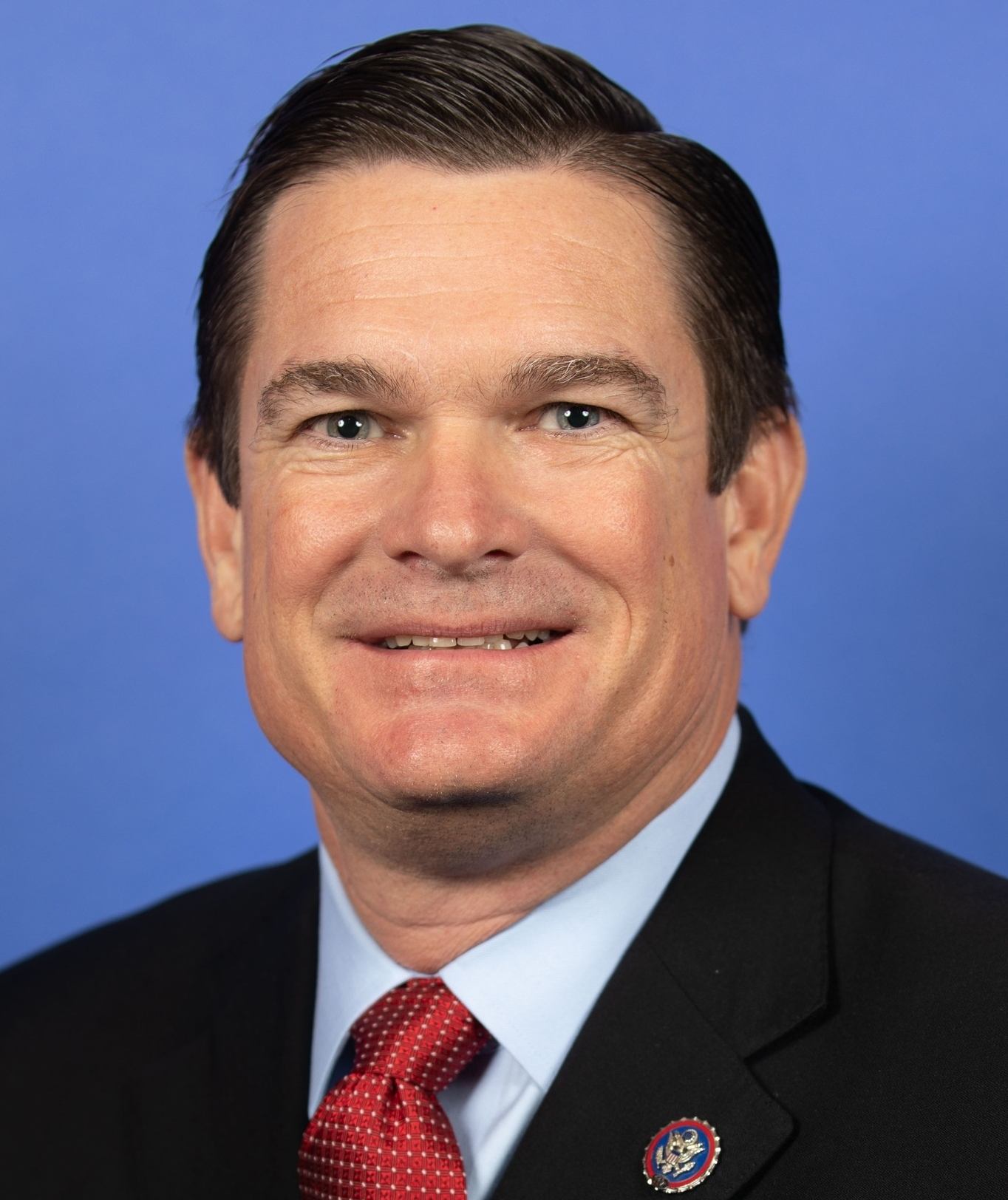
Austin Scott

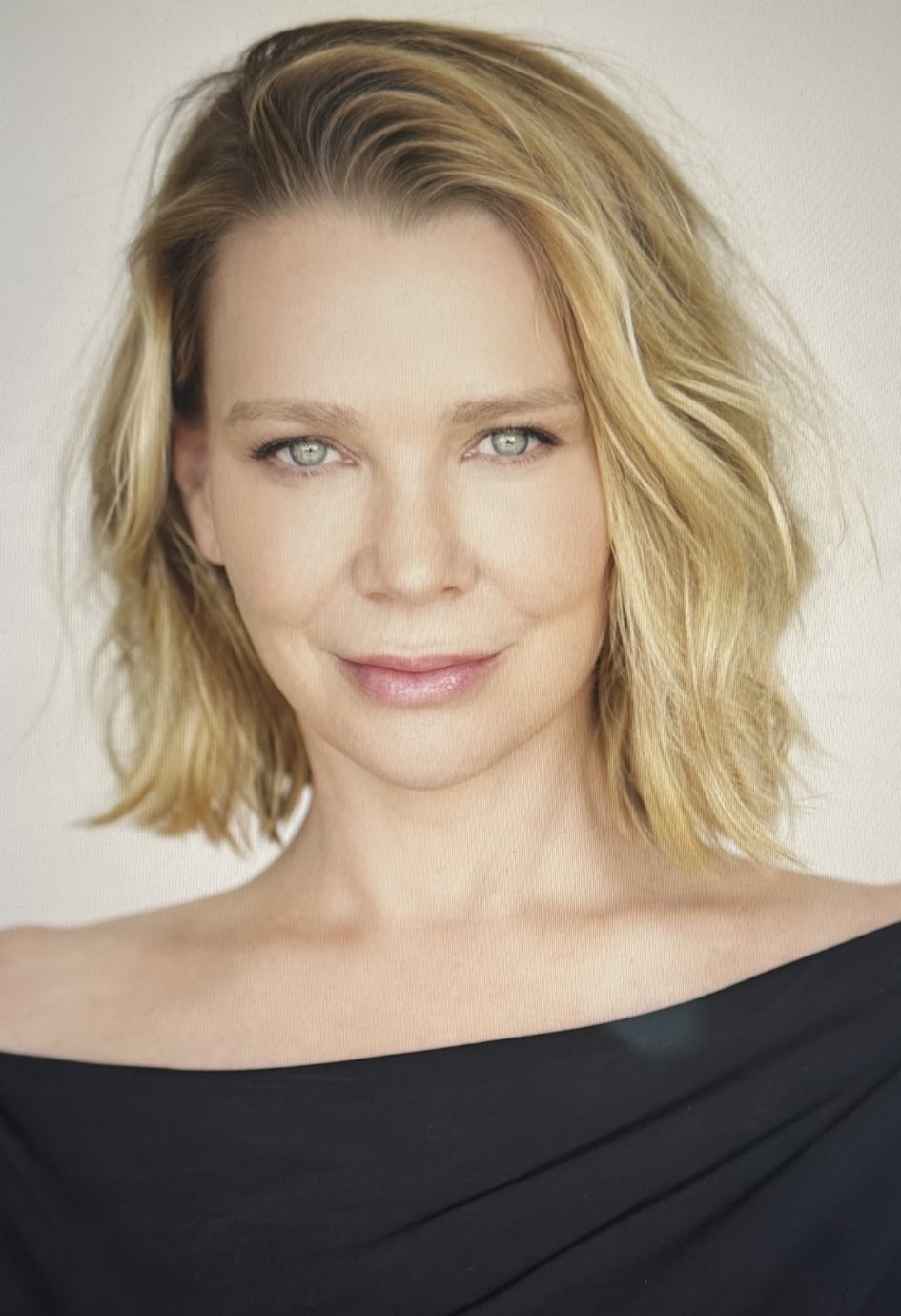
Laurie Holden

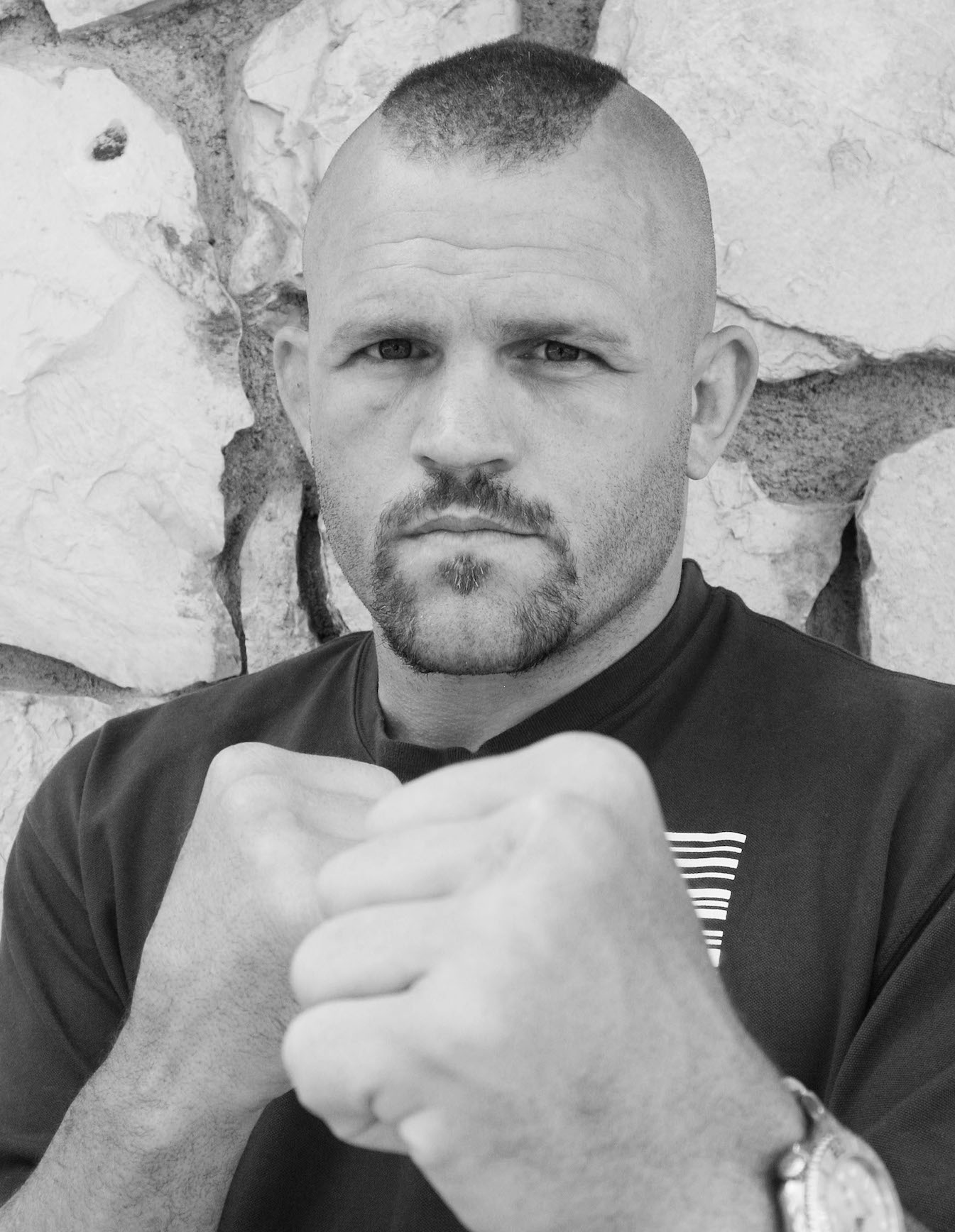
Chuck Liddell

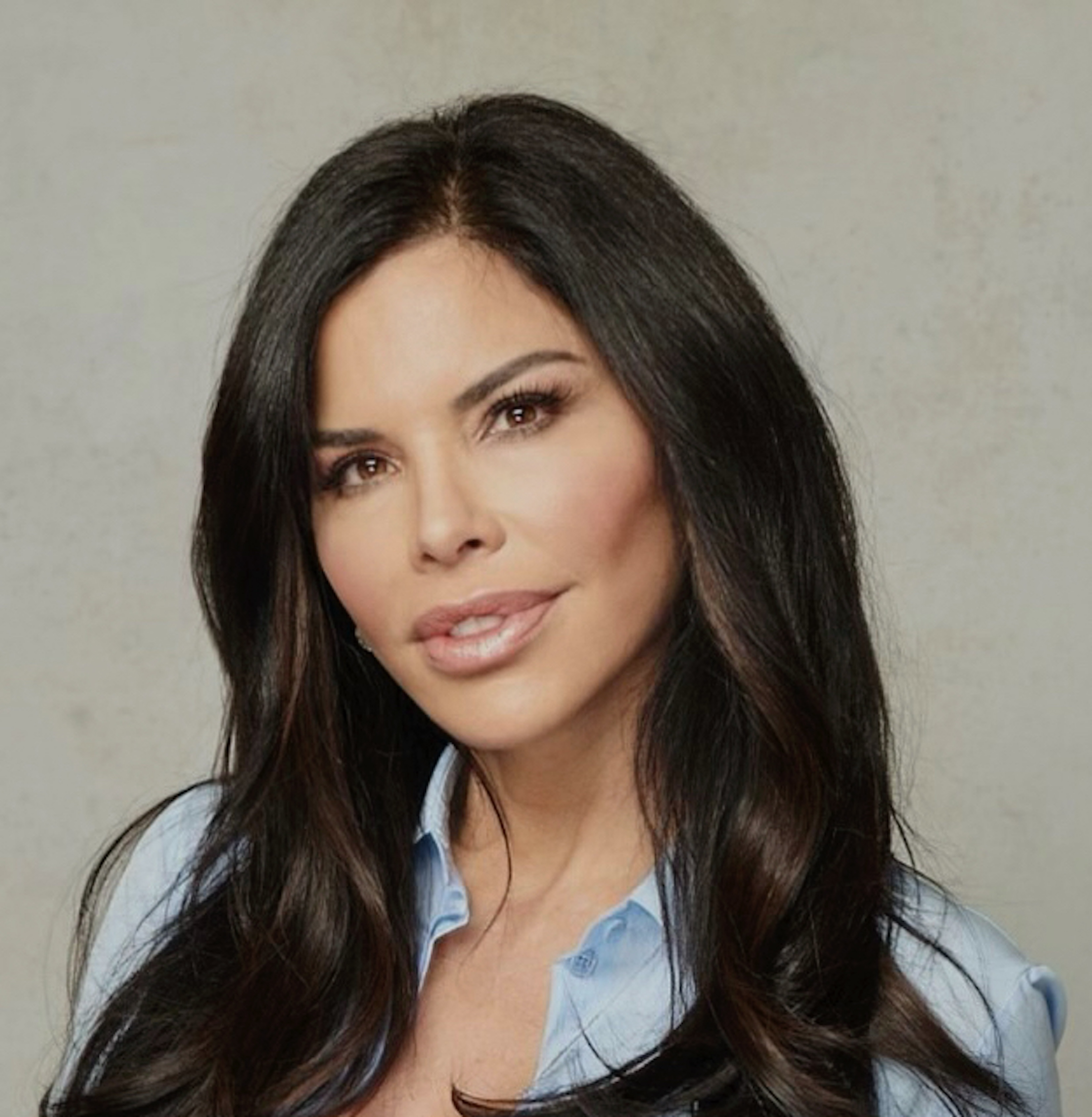
Lauren Sánchez

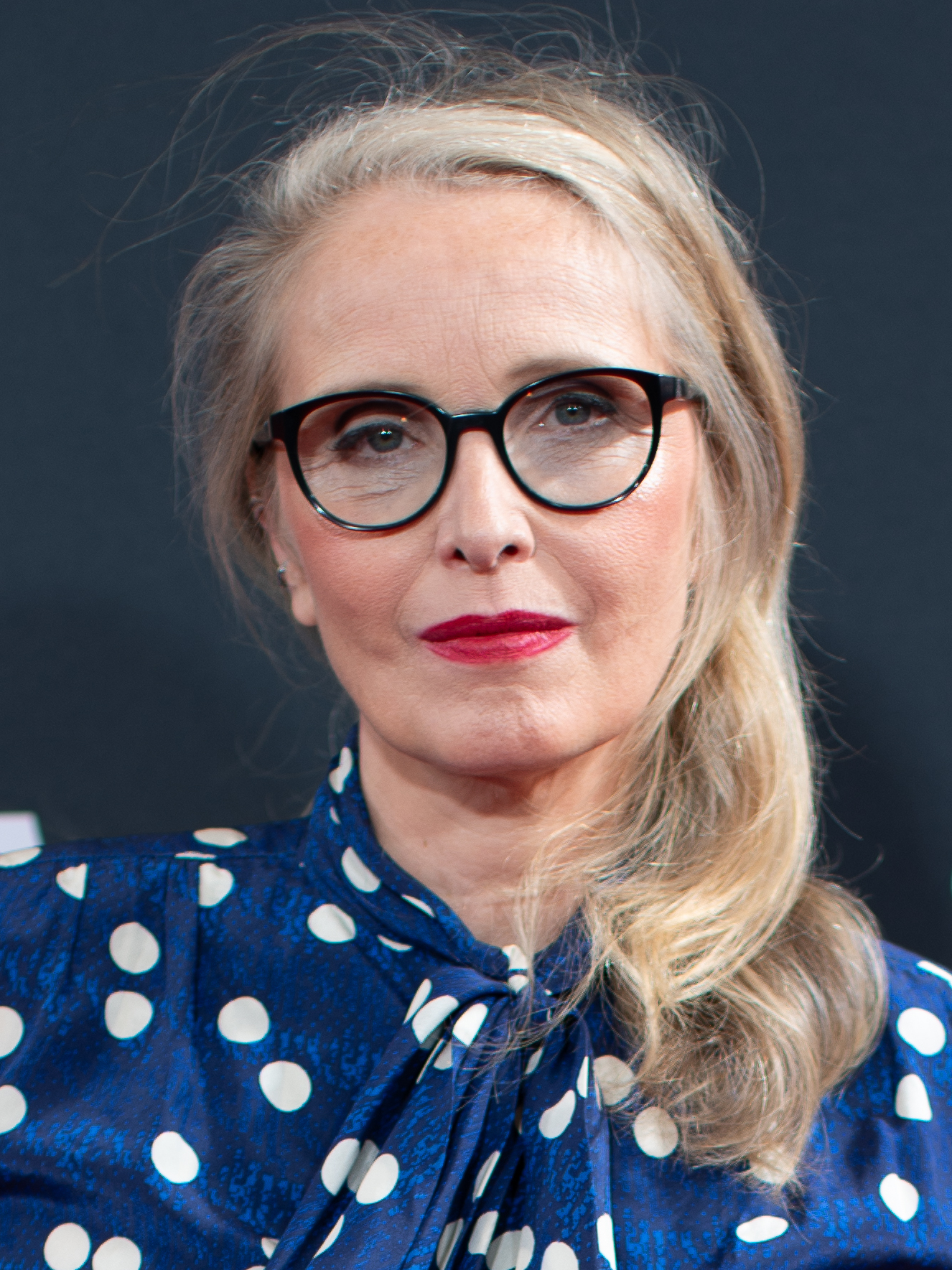
Julie Delpy

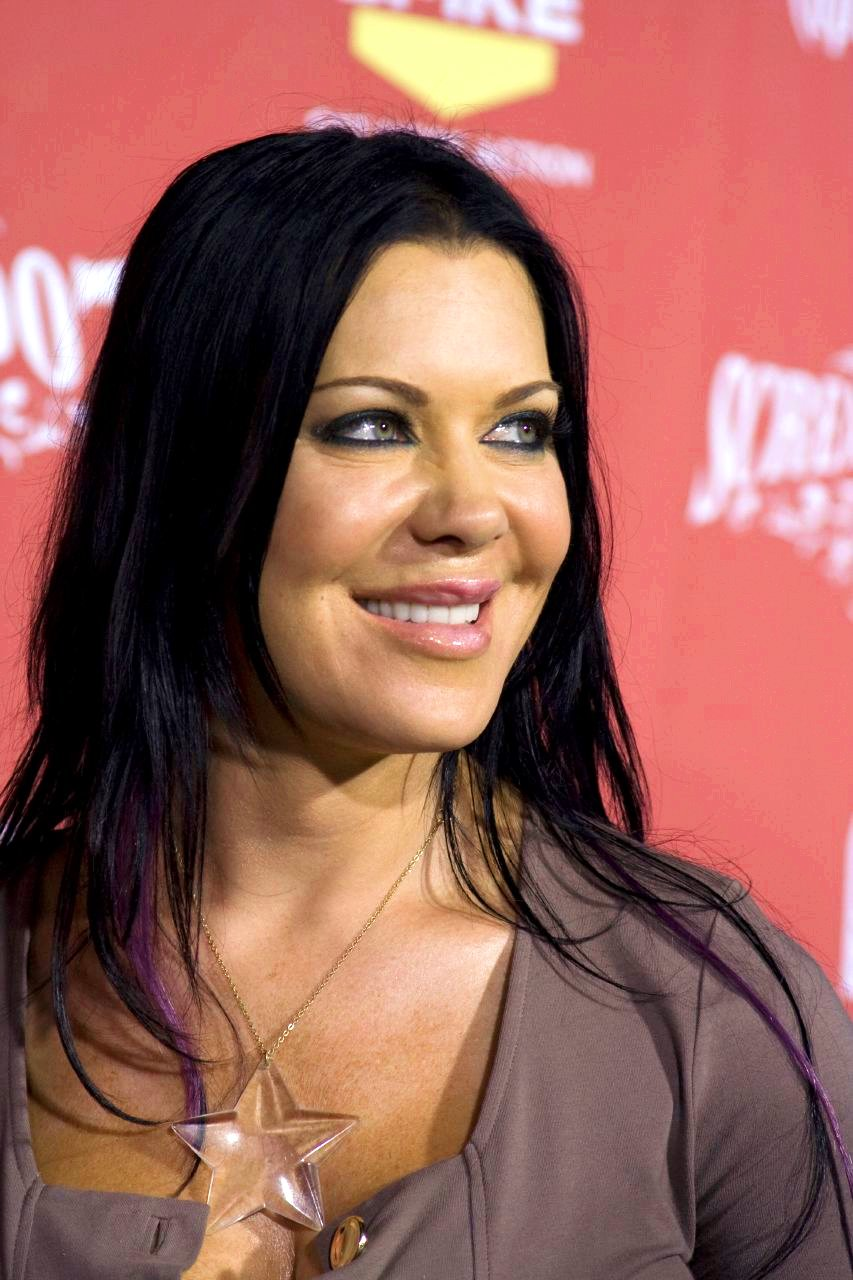
Chyna

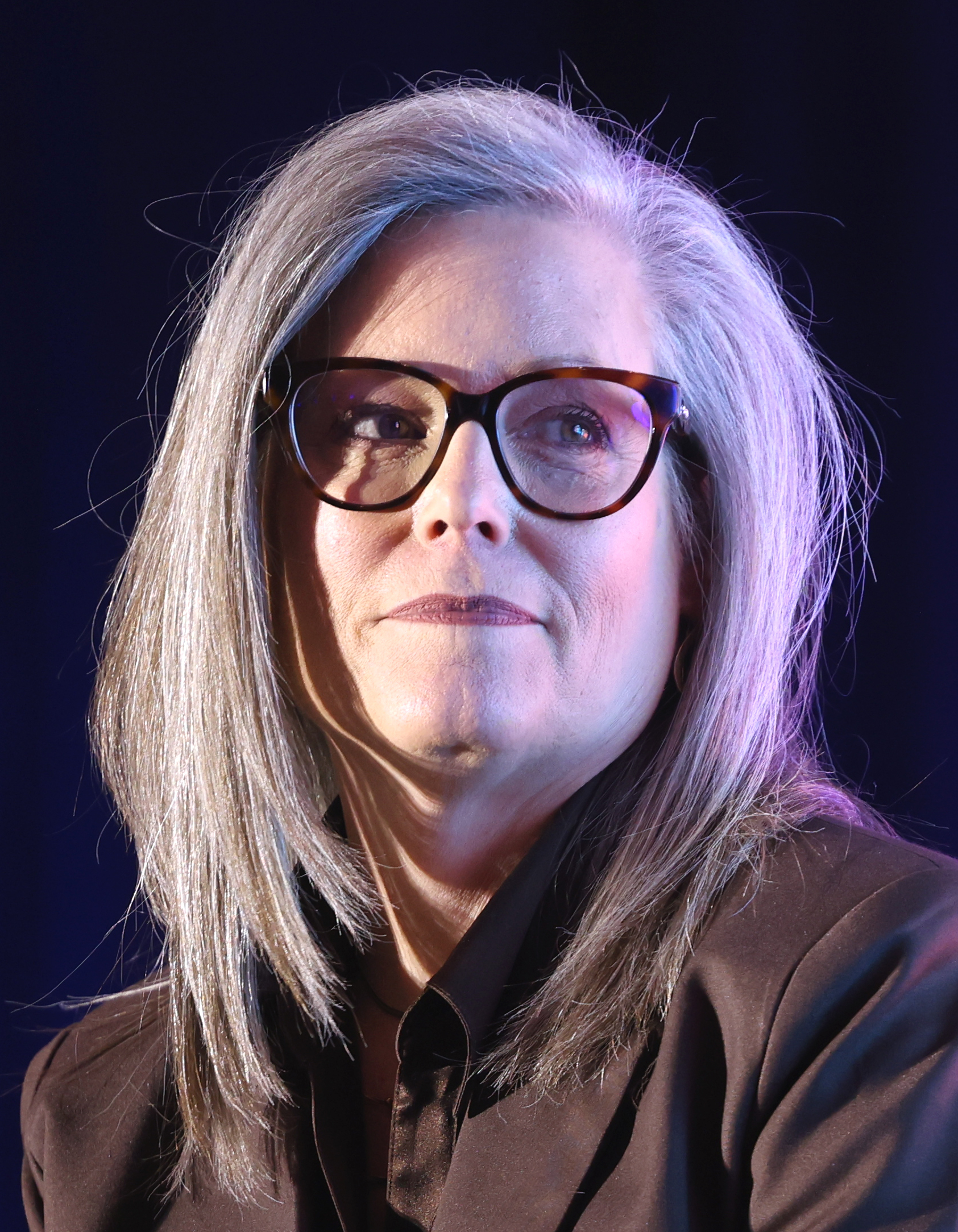
Katie Hobbs

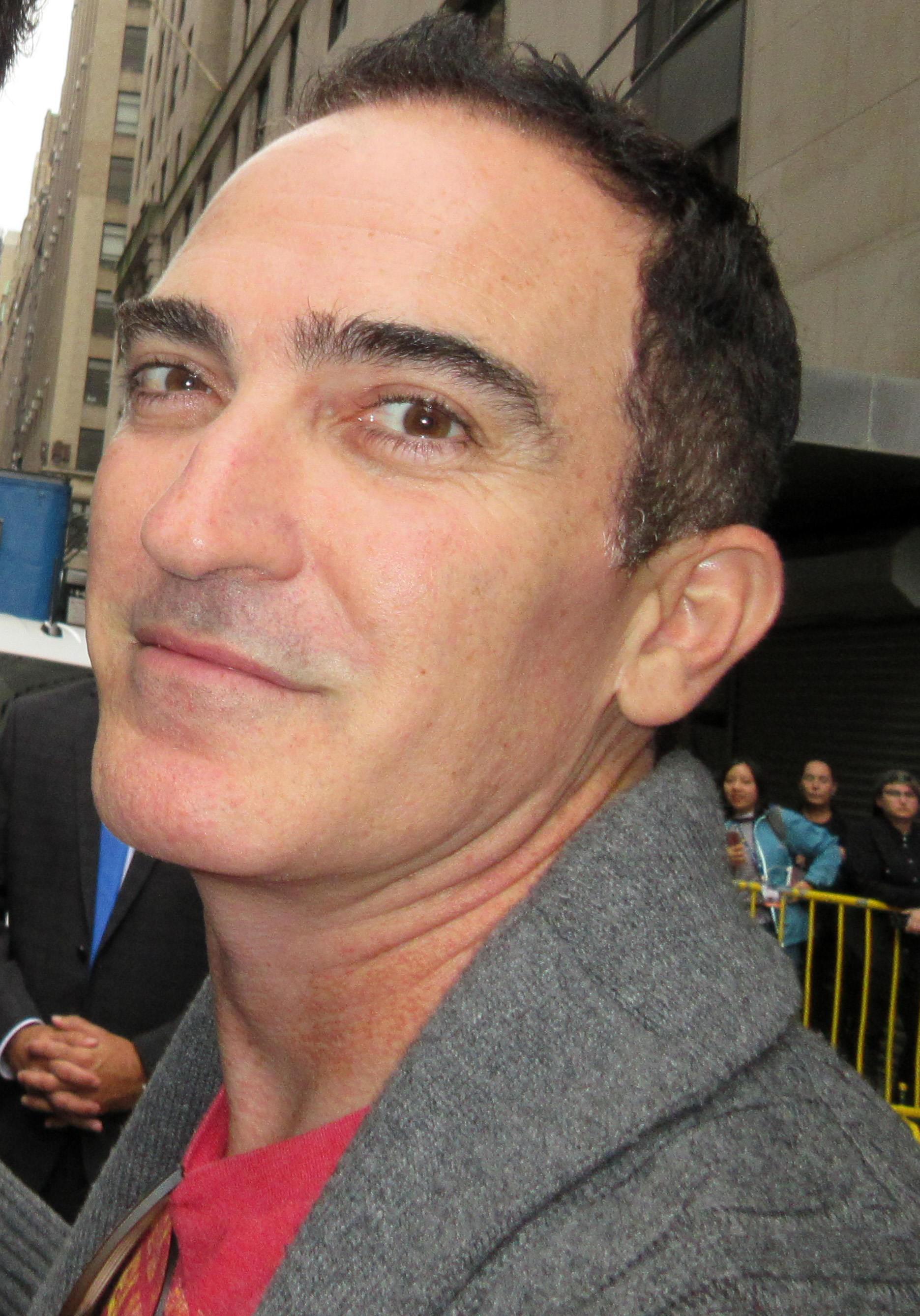
Patrick Fischler

- December 1
  - Stephen K. Benjamin, politician and businessman, mayor of Columbia, South Carolina (2010-2022) and director of the White House Office of Public Engagement (2023-2025)
  - Richard Carrier, historian
  - Amanda Chase, politician
- December 2 – Lewis Bush, football player (d. 2011)
- December 3 – Bill Blunden, author
- December 4
  - J. Stewart Burns, writer and producer
  - Ferric Collons, football player
  - Jay-Z, rapper
- December 5 – Alex Kapp Horner, actress
- December 6
  - Kevin Birr, curler
  - Andrea Salinas, politician
- December 7 – Patrice O'Neal, comedian and radio personality (d. 2011)
- December 8
  - Kerry Earnhardt, race car driver
  - Steve Van Wormer, actor
- December 9
  - Jakob Dylan, rock singer/songwriter and frontman for the Wallflowers
  - Lori Greiner, investor, entrepreneur, and television personality
- December 10 – Austin Scott, politician
- December 11
  - Stacey Blumer, Olympic freestyle skier
  - Sean Grande, basketball announcer
  - Max Martini, actor
- December 12 – D-Shot, rapper
- December 13 – Noam Bramson, politician
- December 14
  - Dave Carnie, skateboarder and writer
  - Archie Kao, actor
- December 15
  - Matt Brown, basketball player and coach
  - Marco Cacopardo, tennis player
  - Cool C, rapper
  - Rick Law, illustrator and producer
- December 16
  - Jeff & Greg Burns, twin composers
  - Adam Riess, astrophysicist, recipient of Nobel Prize in Physics in 2011
- December 17
  - Marty Carter, football player
  - Laurie Holden, actress, producer, model, and human rights activist
  - Chuck Liddell, mixed martial artist
- December 18
  - Eddie Blake, football player
  - Marco Coleman, football player and coach
  - Joe Randa, baseball player and radio talk-show host
- December 19
  - Michael Bates, football player and Olympic sprinter
  - Lauren Sánchez, news anchor
  - Kristy Swanson, actress
- December 20
  - Jason F Beans, entrepreneur
  - Jim Carr, Vice President and Head of Standard Media Group LLC
  - Brian O'Halloran, actor, producer, and podcaster
  - Bobby Phills, basketball player (d. 2000)
- December 21 – Julie Delpy, French-born actress
- December 22
  - Rick Bertrand, politician
  - David Cote, writer
- December 23
  - Jim Bankoff, media executive and co-founder, chairman, and CEO of Vox Media
  - Greg Biffle, race car driver (d. 2025)
  - Martha Byrne, actress and singer
  - Rodney Culver, football player (d. 1996)
  - Rob Pelinka, sports agent
- December 24
  - Brad Anderson, wrestler
  - Kevin Chown, rock bassist
  - Leavander Johnson, boxer (d. 2005)
  - Clinton McKinnon, rock saxophonist
  - Chen Yueling, Chinese-born race walker
  - Jonathan Zittrain, academic internet lawyer
  - Michael Zucchet, economist and politician, mayor of San Diego (2005)
- December 25 – Wayde Butler, football player
- December 27
  - Chyna, wrestler (d. 2016)
  - Sarah Vowell, historian, author, journalist, essayist, social commentator, and actress
- December 28 – Katie Hobbs, politician, 24th Governor of Arizona (2023-present)
- December 29
  - Mike Bagley, motorsports commentator
  - Matthew Berry, writer, columnist, fantasy sports analyst, and television personality
  - George Colligan, jazz musician
  - Jill Cordes, journalist
  - Patrick Fischler, actor
- December 30
  - Joseph R. Bartlett, politician
  - Cade Courtley, television host and Navy SEAL
  - Dave England, stunt performer, television personality, and snowboarder
  - Matt Goldman, record producer
- December 31
  - Christian Barranco, politician
  - Charlie Conrad, politician
  - Cool "Disco" Dan, graffiti artist (d. 2017)
  - Joyce Cooling, jazz musician

=== Full Date Unknown ===
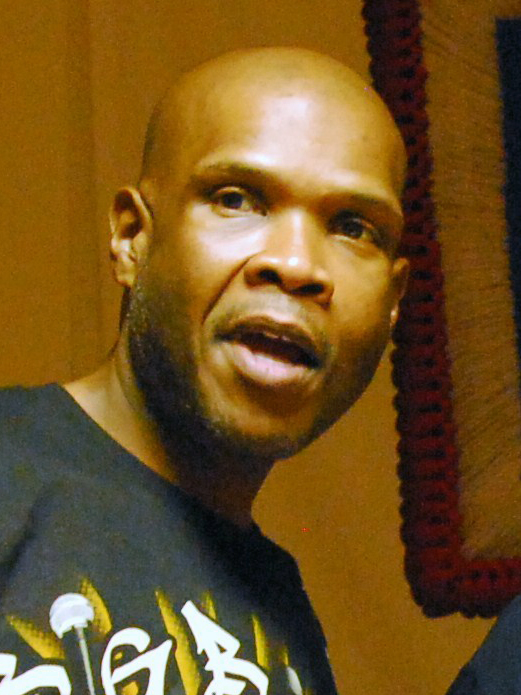
Big Boy

- Darrick Bachman, writer
- Steven Baddour, politician
- Nada Bakos, CIA analyst
- Peter A. Balaskas, author
- Vijay Balasubramanian, Indian-born University professor and theoretical physicist
- Rob Balder, cartoonist and singer/songwriter
- Lucian Ban, Romanian-born jazz pianist
- C.C. Banana, music personality (d. 2012)
- Roman Banks, basketball player and coach
- Dora Barilla, healthcare strategist, executive, educator, and entrepreneur
- Michael Barmada, University professor and geneticist (d. 2016)
- Amy DuBois Barnett, magazine editor
- Jarrett Barrios, politician
- Danté Bartolomeo, politician
- Emily Barton, novelist
- Kyle Bass, investor and businessman
- F. Kay Behm, judge
- Mildred Beltre, activist
- Marc Douglas Berardo, singer/songwriter
- Tanyth Berkeley, photographer
- Jeff Berkwits, science fiction editor
- Leslie Berlin, historian
- David Bernard, meteorologist
- Jay M. Bernhardt, public health specialist and academic
- Jeff Berry, baseball coach and sports agent
- Jennifer Bertino-Tarrant, politician
- Marta Bertoglio, politician
- Reginald Bicha, social worker and government administrator
- Big Boy, radio host
- Big Herk, rapper
- Andy Biggs, photographer
- Michl Binderbauer, Austrian-born physicist and businessman
- Jonathan Bird, cinematographer, photographer, director, and host
- Jayme Lynn Blaschke, journalist and science fiction author
- Fiona Bloom, music industry publicist
- Clifton Bloomfield, serial killer
- Charles Bock, writer
- Tom Boellstorff, anthropologist
- Christopher Boffoli, photographer
- Dan Boneh, Israeli-born University professor
- Boogie, Serbian-born photographer
- Claria Horn Boom, judge
- Susmita Bose, Indian-born scientist and engineer
- Th-resa Bostick, bodybuilder
- Caroline Boudreaux, businesswoman and social entrepreneur
- Lisa Boulanger, neuroscientist
- Geoff Bouvier, poet
- Helen Boyd, author, academic, and activist
- Mike Bradbury, basketball coach
- Anthony Braga, University professor and criminologist
- Nancy E. Brasel, judge
- Rodric Bray, politician
- Neil Brenner, University professor
- Max Brody, musician
- Celia Brooks Brown, chef
- Brian P. Brooks, lawyer, banker, entrepreneur, technologist, and Comptroller of the Currency (2020-2021)
- John W. Broomes, judge
- Bill Brown, composer
- Delia Brown, artist
- Derrick Brown, computer scientist
- Pete Brownell, businessman
- Kathleen Buhle, writer
- Alafair Burke, novelist
- Stephen Burks, designer and University professor
- Ambreen Butt, Pakistani-born artist
- Mary Calvi, journalist
- Julian Segura Camacho, author
- Melani Cammett, political scientist
- Rebecca Campbell, University professor
- Thomas Campbell, filmmaker and visual artist
- Cheryl Capezzuti, artist
- Theodore Caplow, entrepreneur, environmental engineer, and inventor
- Jim Capobianco, director, animator, and screenwriter
- Chris Capossela, businessman, Chief Marketing Officer for Microsoft (2011-2023)
- Brian Cappelletto, Scrabble player
- Frank Carone, lawyer and politician
- Pablo Carrillo, lawyer
- Rebecca Carroll, writer, editor, and radio producer
- Kathy Carter, soccer player and sports executive
- Dave Chameides, steadicam operator and director
- Tina Chang, poet, professor, editor, organizer, and public speaker
- Mark Changizi, cognitive scientist
- Tim Chartier, mathematician
- Semi Chellas, filmmaker
- Jennifer Chiaverini, author
- Chilly Chill, hip hop producer
- Jennifer Choe-Groves, lawyer and judge
- Susan Choi, novelist
- Tiffany Chung, Vietnamese-born artist
- Monique Chyba, control theorist and University professor
- Susan Cianciolo, fashion designer and artist
- Samuel J. Clark, demographer
- Christina Cogdell, art historian and educator
- Jonathan Cohn, author and journalist
- Kevin Cokley, University professor
- David Coleman, businessman and educator
- Melissa Coleman, author and columnist
- Robin R. Means Coleman, author, communication scholar, and educator
- Mike Colona, attorney and politician
- Dalton Conley, University professor and sociologist
- Venicia Considine, politician
- Jason Corder, producer, scriptwriter, actor, singer, and composer
- William Cordova, Peruvian-born artist
- John Corvino, philosopher
- Kristen Cox, writer and politician
- Cedric Crear, politician and businessman
- Carolyn Creedon, poet
- Omar Cunningham, blues singer
- Jon Cutler, musician
- Scott Cutler, business executive and CEO of HealthEquity
- Raissa D'Souza, University professor
- Max Gottlieb, producer, production designer, screenwriter, and director
- Julie Kent, ballerina
- Julie Myers, lawyer and assistant secretary for ICE (2006-2008)
- Jennifer Oakes, poet, novelist, and teacher

== Deaths ==
* January – Daisy and Violet Hilton, English-born conjoined twins and entertainers (b. 1908)
- January 1 – Barton MacLane, screen actor (b. 1902)
- January 2 – Gilbert Miller, theatrical producer (b. 1884)
- January 3
  - Commodore Cochran, Olympic sprinter (b. 1902)
  - Howard McNear, screen character actor (b. 1905)
- January 17
  - Bunchy Carter, political activist (b. 1942)
- January 24 – Anthony Martin Sinatra, Italian-American firefighter, boxer, and father of Frank Sinatra (b, 1892)
  - John Huggins, political activist (b. 1945)
- January 27 – Charles Winninger, actor (b. 1884)
- January 29 – Allen Dulles, director of the Central Intelligence Agency (b. 1893)
- February 3 – Al Taliaferro, Disney comics artist (b. 1905)
- February 5
  - Conrad Hilton Jr., socialite and hotel business heir (b. 1926)
  - Thelma Ritter, comedy actress (b. 1902)
- February 9 – George "Gabby" Hayes, Western film actor (b. 1885)
- February 14 – Vito Genovese, mobster (b. 1897 in Italy)
- February 15 – Pee Wee Russell, jazz clarinetist (b. 1906)
- February 17 – Paul Barbarin, jazz drummer (b. 1899)
- February 19 – Madge Blake, actress (b. 1899)
- February 27
  - John Boles, film actor (b. 1895)
  - William T. Innes, writer, ichthyologist and publisher (b. 1874)
- March 3 – Fred Alexander, tennis player (b. 1880)
- March 4 – Nicholas Schenck, film impresario (b. 1881 in Russia)
- March 9
  - Charles Brackett, novelist and screenwriter (b. 1892)
  - Richard Crane, screen character actor (b. 1918)
- March 11 – Daniel E. Barbey, admiral (b. 1889)
- March 18 – Barbara Bates, film actress, suicide (b. 1925)
- March 21 – Pinky Higgins, baseball player and manager (b. 1909)
- March 25 – Max Eastman, writer (b. 1883)
- March 26 – John Kennedy Toole, novelist, suicide (b. 1937)
- March 28 – Dwight D. Eisenhower, 34th president of the United States from 1953 to 1961 (b. 1890)
- April 4 – Félix Conde Falcón, army soldier, recipient of the Medal of Honor (b. 1938)
- April 5 – Shelby Storck, television producer (b. 1916)
- April 10 – Harley Earl, automotive designer and business executive (b. 1893)
- April 20 – Benny Benjamin, urban and jazz drummer (b. 1925)
- May 1 – Ella Logan, actress and singer (b. 1913 in Scotland)
- May 14
  - Enid Bennett, silent film actress (b. 1893 in Australia)
  - Walter Pitts, logician and cognitive psychologist (b. 1923)
- May 15
  - William Gould, action film actor (b. 1886 in Canada)
  - Robert Rayford, HIV/AIDS victim (b. 1953)
- May 18 – Walter Gropius, Modernist architect (b. 1883 in Germany)
- May 19 – Coleman Hawkins, jazz tenor saxophonist (b. 1904)
- May 20
  - Alex Rackley, political activist (b. 1949)
  - Fred Sherman, film actor (b. 1905)
- May 21 – William Lincoln Bakewell, explorer (b. 1888)
- May 23
  - Frank Gray, physicist and researcher, known for the Gray code (b. 1887)
  - Jimmy McHugh, song composer (b. 1894)
- May 24
  - Paul Birch, actor (b. 1912)
  - Mitzi Green, child actress (b. 1920)
- May 26 – Henry Rago, poet and editor (b. 1915)
- May 27 – Jeffrey Hunter, screen actor (b. 1926)
- June 2 &ndash Leo Gorcey, actor (b. 1917)
- June 8 – Robert Taylor, American actor (b. 1911)
- June 11 – John L. Lewis, President of the United Mine Workers of America from 1920 to 1960 (b. 1889)
- June 18 – Edgar Anderson, botanist (b. 1897)
- June 19 – Natalie Talmadge, silent film actress (b. 1896)
- June 21 – Maureen Connolly, tennis player (b. 1934)
- June 22 – Judy Garland, actress and singer (b. 1922)
- June 23 – Chuck Taylor, basketball player, shoe salesman, and marketer (b. 1901)
- June 24 – Willy Ley, scientific popularizer (b. 1906 in Germany)
- June 28
  - Charles Carpenter, Episcopal bishop (b. 1899)
  - Gerald Fitzgerald, Roman Catholic priest (b. 1894)
- June 29 – Shorty Long, soul singer, songwriter, musician and record producer (b. 1940)
- June 30
  - Roman Richard Atkielski, Roman Catholic bishop (b. 1899)
  - Max Fabian, cinematographer (b. 1891 in Poland)
- July 2 – Michael DiBiase, wrestler (b 1923)
- July 5
  - Ben Alexander, film actor (b. 1911)
  - Walter Gropius, architect (b. 1883 in Germany)
  - Lambert Hillyer, film director (b. 1889)
  - Leo McCarey, film director (b. 1898)
- July 7
  - Charlotte Armstrong, fiction writer (b. 1905)
  - Gladys Swarthout, operatic mezzo-soprano, died in Italy (b. 1900)
- July 17 – Harry Benham, silent film actor (b. 1884)
- July 18
  - Mary Jo Kopechne, teacher, secretary and political campaign specialist, drowned in automobile accident (b. 1940)
  - Barbara Pepper, actress (b. 1915)
- July 21 – A. D. King, African American civil rights activist and Baptist minister, accidental drowning (b. 1930)
- July 26 – Raymond Walburn, character actor (b. 1897)
- July 28 – Frank Loesser, songwriter (b. 1910)
- August 1 – Donald Keith, silent film actor (b. 1910)
- August 9 – Tate–LaBianca murders
  - Jay Sebring, celebrity hair stylist (b. 1933)
  - Sharon Tate, screen actress and model (b. 1943)
- August 17
  - Otto Stern, physicist, recipient of Nobel Prize in Physics in 1943 (b. 1888 in Germany)
  - Ludwig Mies van der Rohe, architect (b. 1886 in Germany)
- August 18 – Mildred Davis, silent film actress (b. 1901)
- August 31 – Rocky Marciano, heavyweight boxer (b. 1923)
- September 3 – John Lester, cricketer (b. 1871 in the United Kingdom)
- September 7 – Everett Dirksen, politician (b. 1896)
- September 8 – Bud Collyer, voice actor and announcer (b. 1908)
- September 16 – Henry Fairfield Osborn Jr., conservationist (b. 1887)
- September 17 – Greye La Spina, dramatist and short story writer (b. 1880)
- September 18 – Hermann Eisner, Wisconsin politician, Austro-Hungarian emigrant (b. 1898)
- September 22 – Rachel Davis Harris, African American librarian (b. 1869)
- September 24 – Warren Sturgis McCulloch, neurophysiologist and cybernetician (b. 1898)
- September 26 – John Thomas Kennedy, general and Medal Honour recipient (b. 1885)
- October 3 – Skip James, blues singer (b. 1902)
- October 6 – Walter Hagen, golfer (b. 1892)
- October 7 – Johnnie Morris, vaudeville and film actor and comedian (b. 1887)
- October 14 – Arnie Herber, American football player (Green Bay Packers) (b. 1910)
- October 15 – Rod La Rocque, film actor (b. 1898)
- October 21 – Jack Kerouac, novelist and poet (b. 1922)
- October 23 – Tommy Edwards, singer-songwriter (b. 1922)
- October 30 – Pops Foster, African American jazz string bass player (b. 1892)
- November 1 – Pauline Bush, silent film actress (b. 1886)
- November 5 – Lloyd Corrigan, screen actor and director (b. 1900)
- November 8
  - Dave O'Brien, film actor (b. 1912)
  - Vesto Slipher, astronomer (b. 1875)
- November 11 – Frank Mills, politician in Ohio legislature (b. 1904)
- November 12 – William F. Friedman, cryptanalyst (b. 1891 in Russia)
- November 13 – Henry A. Roemer, business executive (b. 1884)
- November 15 – Roy D'Arcy, silent and sound film actor (b. 1894)
- November 18 – Joseph P. Kennedy Sr., political patriarch and businessman (b. 1888)
- November 28 – Roy Barcroft, Western film actor (b. 1902)
- December 1 – Magic Sam, Chicago blues guitarist and songwriter (b. 1937)
- December 3 – Ruth White, actress (b. 1914)
- December 4 – Black Panther Party activists, killed in police raid
  - Mark Clark (b. 1947)
  - Fred Hampton (b. 1948)
- December 7 – Lefty O'Doul, baseball player (b. 1897)
- December 13 – Spencer Williams, African American screen actor and filmmaker (b. 1893)
- December 22 – Wilbur Hatch, music composer (b. 1902)
- December 23 – Donald Foster, television actor (b. 1889)
- December 24
  - Cortelia Clark, African American blues singer and guitarist (b. 1906)
  - Seabury Quinn, government lawyer, journalist and pulp magazine author (b. 1889)
- December 31 – Joseph Yablonski, labor leader, murdered (b. 1910)

== See also ==
- List of American films of 1969
- Timeline of United States history (1950–1969)
