= Provisional Law and Second Law on the Coordination of the States with the Reich =

Nazi German laws related to federalism

First Law on the Coordination of the States with the Reich
- Reichsadler of the Weimar Republic, from 1933 to 1935

Government of the German Reich
- Long title: Provisional Law on the Coordination of the States with the Reich
- Enacted by: Government of the German Reich
- Enacted: 31 March 1933
- Signed by: Adolf Hitler; Wilhelm Frick
- Signed: 31 March 1933
- Effective: 31 March 1933
- Repealed: 20 September 1945

Repealed by
- Control Council Law No. 1 - Repealing of Nazi Laws
- Status: Repealed

Second Law on the Coordination of the States with the Reich
- Reichsadler of the Weimar Republic, from 1933 to 1935

Government of the German Reich
- Enacted by: Government of the German Reich
- Enacted: 7 April 1933
- Signed by: Adolf Hitler; Wilhelm Frick
- Signed: 7 April 1933
- Effective: 7 April 1933
- Repealed: 20 September 1945

Repealed by
- Control Council Law No. 1 - Repealing of Nazi Laws
- Status: Repealed

The Provisional Law and Second Law on the Coordination of the States with the Reich (German: Vorläufiges Gesetz und Zweites Gesetz zur Gleichschaltung der Länder mit dem Reich) were two laws enacted by the German government of Adolf Hitler to expand its control over the seventeen German states (Länder). The Provisional (First) Law (31 March 1933) dissolved all the sitting Landtage (state parliaments), except for that of Prussia, and reconstituted them in accordance with the results of the recent parliamentary election of 5 March 1933, which had given the Nazi Party and its coalition partner, the German National People's Party (DNVP), a majority of the Reichstag seats. The Second Law (7 April 1933) established the new powerful position of Reichsstatthalter (Reich Governor) appointed by the central government to effectively take control of each state administration. The effect of these laws was to undermine the power and influence of all political parties other than the Nazis and the DNVP, and to move Germany significantly away from being a federal republic and put it on a path to becoming a unitary state.

== Background ==
=== German federalism ===
Germany long had a federal system of government composed of numerous independent states. The German Empire (1871–1918) contained 25 such states. Twenty-two were hereditary monarchies consisting of four kingdoms, six grand duchies, five duchies and seven principalities. In addition, there were three city-states (Hamburg, Bremen and Lübeck) that were republics. All the states also had some sort of representative assembly, with varying degrees of popular representation and authority. These ranged from freely elected assemblies which acted as true legislatures in the republics, to representatives of the estates in Mecklenburg.

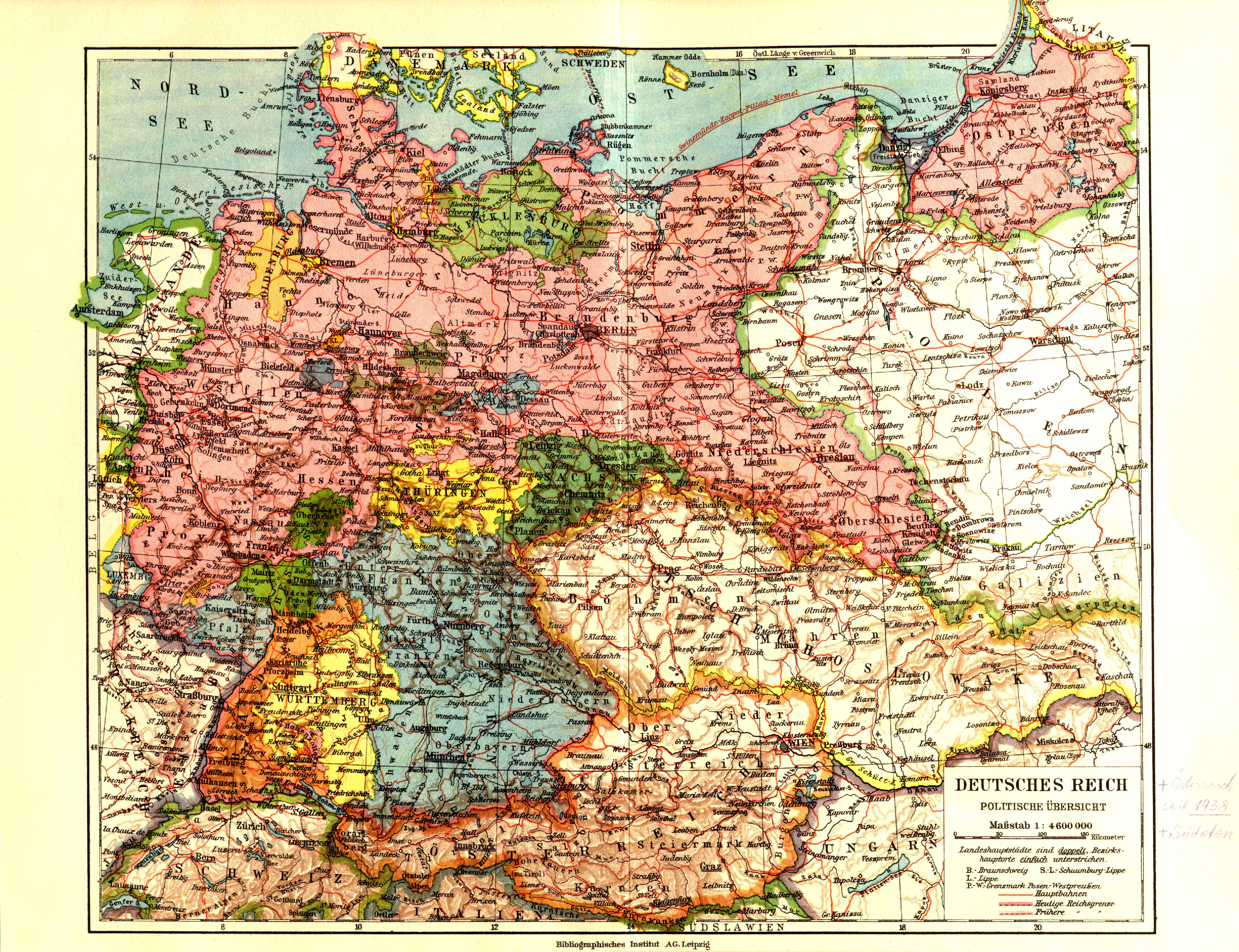
States of the Weimar Republic in 1932.

Following the German Revolution of 1918–1919 and the abolition of the monarchies, the Weimar Republic (1919–1933) was established. After some consolidation, it ultimately consisted of 17 republics, largely styled "free states," each with its own popular assembly. Most were named Landtag but those in the three city-states were called Bürgerschaft (literally, citizenry). All these parliaments were freely elected by universal suffrage and the state governments were responsible to them. The states were largely autonomous in terms of internal affairs and had control over matters such as education and public order, including the police and the courts.

Until 1919, the German municipalities also had far-reaching autonomy. This autonomy of both the municipalities as well as the Länder, was eroded by the reforms of Finance Minister Matthias Erzberger. On 19 August 1919, Erzberger informed the delegates of the National Assembly about his structural reforms:

"I am confident in my position and I want to make that position clear: The implementation of a unified tax organisation for the Reich will be a step towards the construction of a unitarian national state."

The states and municipalities lost their financial independence with passage of the Landessteuergesetz (State Tax Law) of 30 March 1920. Such moves toward more central government found support among those aspiring to create a unitary state. There were some adherents of this policy in most political parties of the time. Some, such as the Nazi Party and the Communist Party of Germany (KPD), even advocated an authoritarian government. Even some of the bourgeois parties wished to accompany centralization with an increase of power for the Reichspräsident (Reich President).

=== Federation for the Renewal of the Reich ===
In 1928, the Federation for the Renewal of the ''Reich'' was founded. This organization was composed of several interest groups of industrialists, bankers, farmers, politicians, administrators, scientists, and journalists. This umbrella organization, first chaired by former Reich Chancellor Hans Luther, worked to establish an authoritarian presidential government. One of their proposals involved a major reorganization of the states. At the time, Prussia was by far the largest state with about two thirds of Germany's land and three fifths of its population. To strengthen the central government vis-à-vis the states, the Federation proposed that all the states in northern Germany should be merged into Prussia to form a Reichsland directly governed by the Reich government. The four southern states of Baden, Bavaria, Saxony and Württemberg, where feelings for federalism were strongest, would remain autonomous. Although this actual plan was never implemented, the philosophy behind it contributed to subsequent developments.

=== Prussian coup d'état of 1932 ===
The first major step towards the abolition of the German federal system was taken on 20 July 1932 with the so-called Prussian coup d'état. Using the outbreak of violence that occurred on Altona Bloody Sunday as a pretext, Reich Chancellor Franz von Papen obtained the consent of Reich President Paul von Hindenburg to supersede the Social Democratic government of Prussian Minister-President Otto Braun through invocation of the policy of Reichsexekution. Papen became the de facto ruler of Prussia, with the title of Reichskommissar. Braun remained the titular premier but with little power; he was finally dismissed by presidential decree on 6 February 1933. In the aftermath of the coup, Papen used his new position of power to replace dozens of Social Democratic and liberal police-presidents and regional administrators throughout Prussia with more conservative and autocratic officials. The coup was a flagrant violation of the Weimar Constitution. Papen's coup dealt a staggering blow to the Republic by destroying the principle of federalism, seizing control of the largest state and opening the door to further centralization.

Around the time of this coup, the term Gleichschaltung ("coordination" or "synchronization") meaning the abolition of the autonomy of the German states first came into use. Other terms such as Verreichlichung (roughly "Reichification") as well as Unitarisierung ("unitization") also were used by the German public to describe this centralization of power. After the Nazis came to power, the term Gleichschaltung was expanded to apply to the process by which other institutions of government and society were also centralized and put under the Reich's control.

=== Hitler's accession and the Enabling Act ===
When Hitler was appointed Reich Chancellor on 30 January 1933, the Nazi Party had control of only five of the state governments. Hitler perceived that elements in the remaining states could form the nucleus of an opposition to the central government. Using the Reichstag Fire as a pretext, the Nazi government persuaded Reich President Hindenburg to issue the Reichstag Fire Decree (28 February 1933) which significantly curtailed civil liberties. They then passed through the Reichstag, in the form of a constitutional amendment, the Enabling Act (23 March 1933) which granted to the chancellor and his cabinet emergency powers to enact and enforce laws without the involvement of the Reichstag for a period of four years. Having thus obtained essentially dictatorial control of the central government, Hitler set about curtailing the independence of the Länder and seizing control of the state government institutions.

== Issuance of the provisional (first) law ==
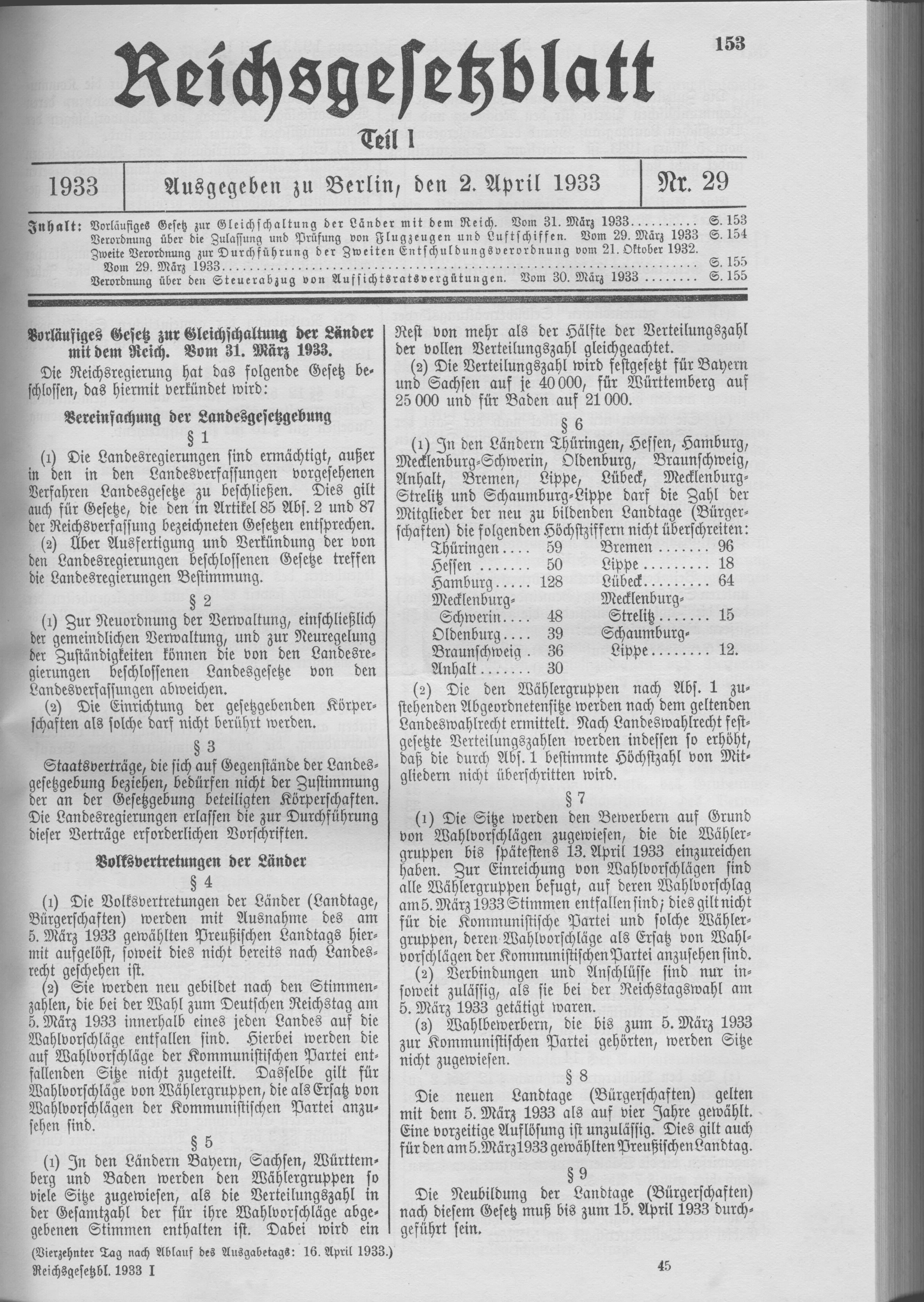
Promulgation of Provisional Law on the Coordination of the States with the Reich in the Reichsgesetzblatt of 2 April 1933.

The Nazi government used the emergency powers granted to it by the Enabling Act to issue the "Provisional Law on the Coordination of the States with the Reich" on 31 March 1933. This decree dissolved the duly-elected sitting state parliaments of the German Länder except for the Prussian Landtag that was elected on 5 March and which the Nazis controlled. It then reconstituted them based on the electoral results of the 5 March 1933 Reichstag election, except that Communist seats were left vacant. This law essentially nullified the results of the most recent Landtag elections and effectively installed a working majority for the Nazis and their ally, the DNVP, in each state. The law was a clear violation of the Weimar Constitution. However, the Enabling Act allowed the cabinet to pass laws that could "deviate from the Constitution" if they did not affect the institutions and existence of the Reichstag and Reichsrat or encroach on the presidency.

== Issuance of the second law ==
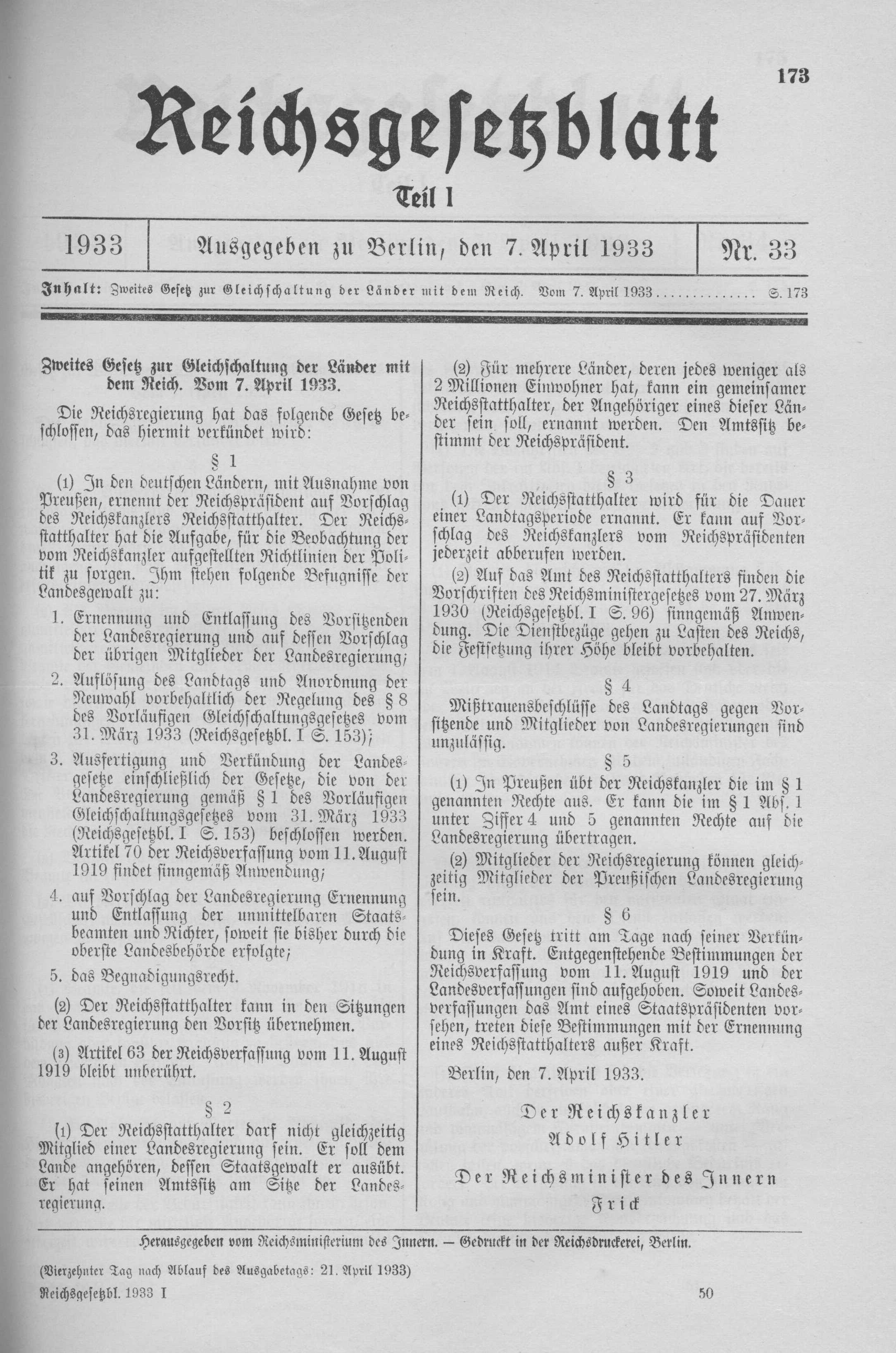
Promulgation of the Second Law on the Coordination of the States with the Reich in the Reichsgesetzblatt of 7 April 1933.

On 7 April 1933, the Reich government issued the "Second Law on the Coordination of the States with the Reich." This law provided for the appointment by the Reich president, on the advice of the Reich chancellor, of a Reichsstatthalter (Reich Governor) to oversee the government of each state. These new central government officials were charged with ensuring that the policy guidelines formulated by the Reich chancellor were observed. They were empowered to preside over meetings of the state government, and to appoint and dismiss the minister-presidents of the state governments as well as other high officials and judges. They also could promulgate state laws, dissolve the state parliaments, call for new elections and grant pardons. With these new powerful officials in place by May 1933, soon all the state governments were in the hands of loyal Nazi politicians. The law also specifically prohibited motions of no confidence by the state parliaments against the minister-presidents or other members of the state governments. The Second Law also specifically conferred the executive authority in Prussia as Reichsstatthalter directly on the Reich chancellor, namely, Hitler.

== Subsequent actions ==
- On 10 April 1933, Hitler, acting in his capacity as Reichsstatthalter for Prussia, formally named Hermann Göring Minister President of Prussia (as well as interior minister) effectively superseding Papen who had held the post of Prussian Reichskommissar in the Hitler cabinet since 30 January. (On 30 June 1933, a presidential regulation was enacted formally repealing the position of Prussian Reichskomissar.) On 25 April 1933, Hitler also delegated his powers as Prussian Reichsstatthalter to Göring.
- On 18 May 1933, the Landtag of Prussia met for the last time and passed an enabling act that conferred emergency legislative powers on the Göring administration for a period of four years.
- On 30 January 1934, the Reichstag passed the "Law on the Reconstruction of the Reich." This law formally abolished the parliaments of the German states, subordinated the state administrations to the Reich, and transferred the states' sovereignty to the central government. It also placed the Reichsstatthalter under the supervision of the Reich ministry of the interior, ensuring more centralized control.
- The Reichsrat, the upper body of Germany's parliament whose members were appointed by the state governments to represent their interests in national legislation, was now rendered superfluous. Within two weeks, the Reich government formally dissolved the Reichsrat by enacting the "Law on the Abolition of the Reichsrat" on 14 February 1934.
- By late 1934, all Prussian state ministries, with the exception of the Prussian finance ministry, had been merged with the corresponding Reich ministries.

Federalism in Germany was de facto replaced with a unitary system. Although the German states as constituted during the Weimar Republic would continue to exist de jure until the fall of the Nazi regime at the end of the Second World War, they would in practice be replaced by the Nazi Party Gaue.

== Sources ==
- Broszat, Martin (1987). Hitler and the Collapse of Weimar Germany. Berg Publishers Ltd. ISBN 978-0-854-96517-5.
- Broszat, Martin (1981). The Hitler State: The Foundation and Development of the Internal Structure of the Third Reich. New York: Longman Inc. ISBN 978-0-582-48997-4.
- Evans, Richard J. (2005). The Coming of the Third Reich. New York: Penguin Books. ISBN 978-0-143-03469-8.
- Nicholls, Anthony J. (2000). Weimar and the Rise of Hitler. New York: St. Martin's press. ISBN 978-0-312-23351-8.
- Orlow, Dietrich (1969). The History of the Nazi Party: 1919–1933. University of Pittsburgh Press. ISBN 0-8229-3183-4.
- Robinson, Janet; Robinson, Joe (2009). Handbook of Imperial Germany. Author House. ISBN 978-1-449-02113-9.
- Zentner, Christian; Bedürftig, Friedemann, eds. (1997) [1991]. The Encyclopedia of the Third Reich. New York: Da Capo Press. ISBN 978-0-306-80793-0.
