= Law on the Reconstruction of the Reich =

Law abolishing state parliaments in Nazi Germany

- Reichsadler of the Weimar Republic, from 1933 to 1935

Reichstag
- Citation: RGBl. 1934 I p. 75
- Enacted by: Reichstag
- Enacted: 30 January 1934
- Signed by: Reich President; Paul von Hindenburg
- Signed: 30 January 1934
- Effective: 30 January 1934
- Status: Repealed

The Law on the Reconstruction of the Reich (German: Gesetz über den Neuaufbau des Reichs) of 30 January 1934, was a sweeping constitutional change to the structure of the German state by the government of Nazi Germany. It was one of the key pieces of legislation that served as the basis for the policy of Gleichschaltung, or coordination, by which Adolf Hitler and the Nazi Party successfully established their totalitarian control over all aspects of the German government and society. The law abolished the independent parliaments (Landtage) of the then-extant 16 German states and transferred the states' sovereignty to the central government. It essentially converted Germany from a federal republic to a highly centralized unitary state.

== Background ==
Germany long had a federal system of government composed of numerous independent states (German: Länder). The German Empire (1871–1918) contained 25 such states. Twenty-two were hereditary monarchies consisting of four kingdoms, six grand duchies, five duchies and seven principalities. In addition, there were three city-states (Hamburg, Bremen and Lübeck) that were republics. All the states also had some sort of representative assembly, with varying degrees of popular representation and authority. These ranged from freely elected assemblies which acted as true legislatures in the republics, to representatives of the estates in Mecklenburg.

States of the Weimar Republic in 1919. (By 1934, Waldeck-Pyrmont and Mecklenburg-Strelitz had been merged with other states.)

Following the German Revolution of 1918–1919 and the abolition of the monarchies, the Weimar Republic (1919–1933) was established. After some consolidation, it ultimately consisted of 17 republics, largely styled "free states," each with its own popular assembly. Most were named Landtag but those in the three city-states were called Bürgerschaft (literally, citizenry). All these parliaments were freely elected by universal popular franchise and the state governments were responsible to them. The states were largely autonomous in terms of internal affairs and had control over matters such as education and public order, including the police and the courts.

When Hitler was appointed Reich Chancellor at the end of January 1933, the Nazi Party had control of only a few of the state governments and Hitler perceived that elements in the remaining states could form the nucleus of an opposition to the central government. He therefore set about curtailing their independence and seizing control of the government institutions. The first effort in this regard was the Provisional Law on the Coordination of the States with the Reich. The Nazi government used the emergency powers granted to it by the Enabling Act to issue this law on 31 March 1933. The law directed that the existing elected Landtage were to be reconstituted on the basis of each party's share of the votes received in the Reichstag election of 5 March 1933, that had given the Nazis nearly 44% of the vote. Communist seats were left vacant. In this manner, the Nazis, in conjunction with their allies the conservative German National People's Party who had polled nearly 8%, were able to take control of all the state parliaments.

This was followed in short order by the Second Law on the Coordination of the States with the Reich, similarly decreed by the Reich government under its emergency powers on 7 April 1933. This law provided for the appointment by the Reich President, on the advice of the Reich Chancellor, of a Reichsstatthalter (Reich Governor) to oversee the government of each state. These new central government officials were charged with ensuring that the policy guidelines formulated by the Reich Chancellor were observed. They were empowered to preside over meetings of the state government, and to appoint and dismiss the minister-presidents of the state governments as well as other officials and judges. They also could promulgate state laws, dissolve the state parliaments, call for new elections and grant pardons. With these new powerful officials in place by May 1933, soon all the state governments were in the hands of loyal Nazi politicians. The law also specifically prohibited motions of no confidence by the state parliaments against the minister-presidents or other members of the state governments.

The next step in the plan to seize total control of the states was to be accomplished by the complete elimination of the state parliaments.

== Text ==
The proposed law was rather short, especially considering its extraordinary historical and constitutional significance. With only a few sentences, it proposed wiping away all popularly elected assemblies in the Länder, vesting all sovereignty with the Reich government in Berlin, and subordinating the state governments to the Reich government in Berlin. Most of the Gleichschaltung laws were drafted in a similar manner and were quite short, especially considering their ramifications.

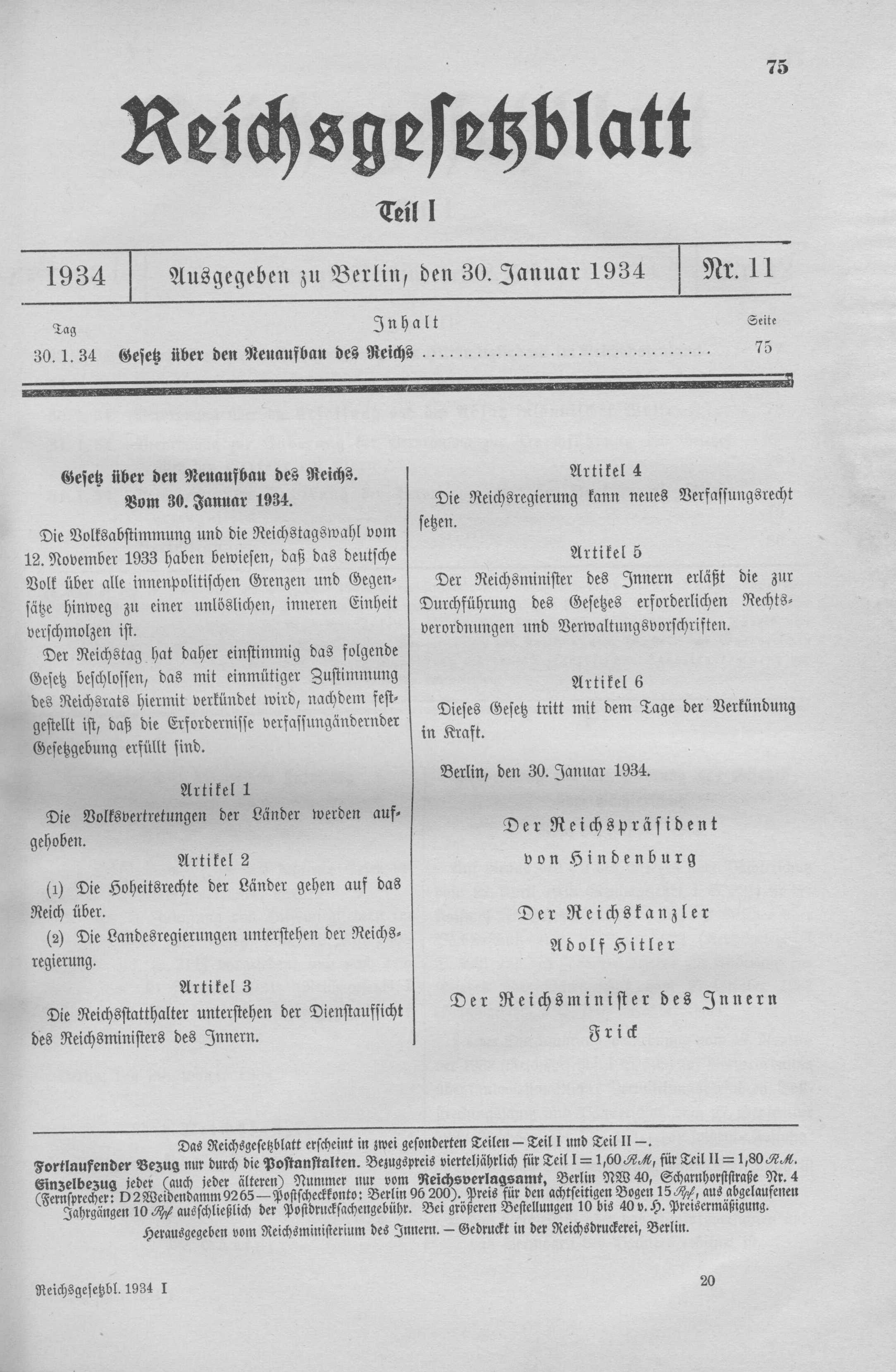
Promulgation of the Law on the Reconstruction of the Reich, in the Reichsgesetzblatt of 30 January 1934.

Law on the Reconstruction of the Reich

The popular referendum and the Reichstag election of 12 November 1933, have proven that the German people have attained an indissoluble internal unity transcending all internal political borders and differences. Consequently, the Reichstag has enacted the following law which is hereby promulgated with the unanimous vote of the Reichstag after ascertaining that the requirements of the Reich Constitution have been met:

ARTICLE I

Popular assemblies of the states shall be abolished.

ARTICLE II

(1) The sovereign powers of the states are transferred to the Reich.

(2) The state governments are placed under the Reich government.

ARTICLE III

The Reich Governors are placed under the administrative supervision of the Reich Minister of Interior.

ARTICLE IV

The Reich Government may issue new constitutional laws.

ARTICLE V

The Reich Minister of Interior may administer the necessary legal and administrative regulations for the execution of the law.

ARTICLE VI

This law shall be effective on the day of its promulgation.

Berlin, 30 January 1934

The Reich President von Hindenburg

The Reich Chancellor Adolf Hitler

The Reich Minister of the Interior Frick

== Enactment ==
The 30 January 1934, session of the Reichstag, on the first anniversary of Hitler's appointment as Reich Chancellor, began with a long speech by Hitler. In a mockery of parliamentary procedure, the law was formally introduced, advanced through three readings in under five minutes by Reichstag President Hermann Göring, and adopted without any debate or dissenting votes. The session was accompanied by derisive laughter from the over 600 brown-shirted Nazi Reichstag deputies. President Hindenburg signed the law on the same day.

== Effects ==
- The parliaments of all the German states were abolished, and the states' sovereignty was transferred to the central Reich government.
- The state governments were legally subordinated to the Reich government, reducing the states to administrative units of the Reich (provinces in some sources).
- The Reich Governors came under the supervision of the Reich Ministry of the Interior, ensuring more centralized control.
- The conferring and regulation of citizenship became a matter for the central government. State citizenship was abolished as a separate concept and became subsumed into German national citizenship.
- The Reichsrat, the upper body of Germany's parliament, whose members were appointed by the state governments to represent their interests in national legislation, had effectively been rendered impotent. The Reich government soon formally dissolved the Reichsrat on 14 February 1934, by passage of the "Law on the Abolition of the Reichsrat."
- The restrictions of the Enabling Act of 1933, which prevented government-issued laws from affecting the Reichstag, Reichsrat, and Presidency, were effectively nullified.

In announcing the passage of the law and its anticipated results in a radio address the day after its passage, Interior Minister Frick declared: "A centuries old dream has been fulfilled. Germany is no longer a weak federal state, but a strong national, centralized country."

== Postwar reversal ==
After the defeat of Nazi Germany in the Second World War in May 1945, Germany was divided into four military occupation zones administered by the United States, the United Kingdom, France and the Soviet Union. As the occupation authorities prepared to hold elections for new local and regional representative assemblies, they approved the formation of reestablished Länder in 1946–47. Some of these corresponded to the former states and some were new creations, largely due to the dissolution of Prussia, formerly the largest German state. By 1947, the Länder in the western zones had freely elected parliamentary assemblies, thus effectively repealing the provisions of the Law on the Reconstruction of the Reich. Institutional developments followed a superficially similar pattern in the Soviet zone, but there the electoral process was less than fully free.

When West Germany was formed on 23 May 1949, eleven Länder were formally recognized as component entities in the new Basic Law for the Federal Republic of Germany and they retained their state parliaments. When East Germany was established on 7 October 1949, five Länder were components of the new nation. However, in 1952 14 districts (Bezirke) were promulgated in their place. In preparation for German reunification, the five Länder were reestablished on 23 August 1990, together with a newly re-united Berlin. They became federal components of the newly united Germany on 3 October and held free state parliamentary elections on 14 October.

== See also ==
- Federalism in Germany
- Gleichschaltung
- States of the Weimar Republic

== Sources ==
- Broszat, Martin (1981). The Hitler State: The Foundation and Development of the Internal Structure of the Third Reich. New York: Longman Inc. ISBN 978-0-582-48997-4.
- Hailbronner, Kay (2006). "Germany". In Bauböck, Rainer; Ersbøll, Eva; Groenendijk, Kees; Waldrauch, Harald (eds.). Acquisition and Loss of Nationality Volume 2: Country Analyses – Policies and Trends in 15 European Countries. Amsterdam University Press. pp. 213–252. ISBN 978-90-5356-921-4. JSTOR j.ctt46n00f.10.
- Nicholls, Anthony J. (2000). Weimar and the Rise of Hitler. New York: St. Martin's press. ISBN 978-0-312-23351-8.
- Robinson, Janet; Robinson, Joe (2009). Handbook of Imperial Germany. Author House. ISBN 978-1-449-02113-9.
- Zentner, Christian; Bedürftig, Friedemann, eds. (1997) [1991]. The Encyclopedia of the Third Reich. New York: Da Capo Press. ISBN 978-0-306-80793-0.
