= Law on the Abolition of the Reichsrat =

1934 law of Nazi Germany

- Reichsadler of the Weimar Republic, from 1933 to 1935

Hitler cabinet
- Citation: RGBl. 1934 I p. 89
- Enacted by: Hitler cabinet
- Signed by: Adolf Hitler, Reich Chancellor; Wilhelm Frick, Interior Minister
- Signed: 14 February 1934
- Commenced: 14 February 1934
- Status: Repealed

The Law on the Abolition of the Reichsrat (German: Gesetz über die Aufhebung des Reichsrats) was a measure enacted by the government of Nazi Germany on 14 February 1934 that abolished the Reichsrat, the second chamber of the German parliament.

== Background ==
The Constitution of the Weimar Republic established a bicameral parliament consisting of the Reichstag and the Reichsrat. The Reichsrat (Reich Council) was the body by which the German federal states (German: Länder) participated in the formation of legislation at the national level. Reichsrat deputies were members or representatives of the state ministries, and were bound by the instructions of their respective state governments. States were represented in the Reichsrat on the basis of their population. While the Reichsrat was customarily referred to as the "upper chamber," it was actually not as powerful as the Reichstag. Its powers consisted more of delaying or blocking proposed legislation by withholding its required assent. Reich government ministers were required to inform the Reichsrat of proposed legislation or administrative regulations and allow it to voice objections. The Reichsrat could also veto legislation that was passed by the Reichstag, and the veto only could be overridden by a two-thirds vote of the Reichstag.

After Adolf Hitler became Reich Chancellor on 30 January 1933, he initiated the process of Gleichschaltung (coordination) to assume control of all aspects of the German government and society. The first steps involved seizing effective control of the state Landtage (parliaments) through the Provisional Law on the Coordination of the States with the Reich (31 March 1933). The next step came with the Second Law on the Coordination of the States with the Reich (7 April 1933), which appointed a Reich Governor (Reichsstatthalter) in each state to oversee the government administration. Perhaps most importantly, the Law on the Reconstruction of the Reich (30 January 1934) abolished the state Landtage and formally transferred the sovereignty of the states to the central Reich government.

The states, though not eliminated, were no longer participating components in a federal system but mere administrative units of a highly centralized unitary state. At this point, they no longer had even a nominal role in national policy, so it made little sense to retain the Reichsrat. Hence, the next logical step in the relentless Nazi diminishment of the states was the elimination of the Reichsrat altogether. This to be accomplished by the Law on the Abolition of the Reichsrat, which was drafted by Reich Interior Minister Wilhelm Frick who also served as the presiding officer of the Reichsrat.

== Text ==
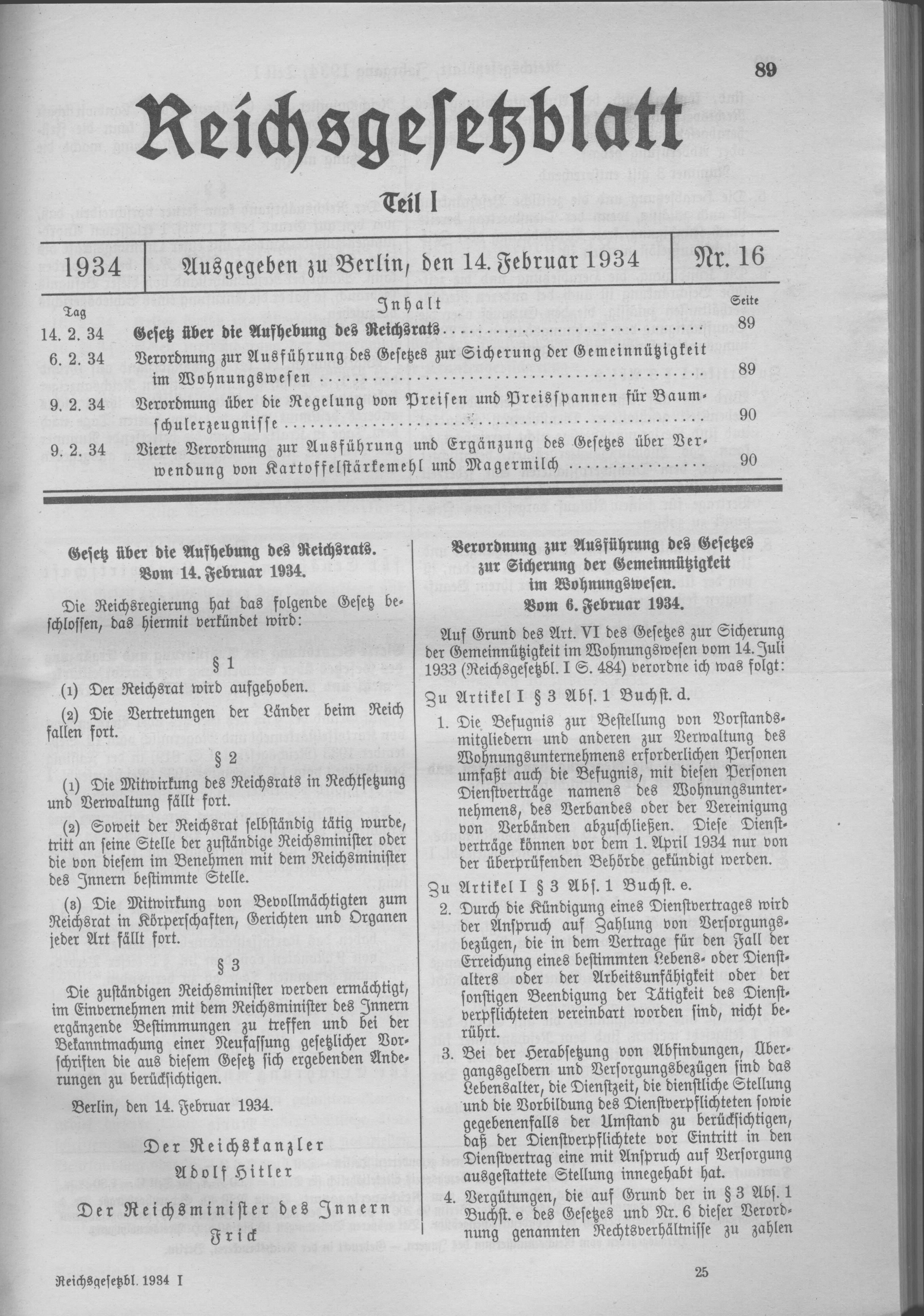
Promulgation of the Law on the Abolition of the Reichsrat in the Reichsgesetzblatt of 14 February 1934

Law on the Abolition of the Reichsrat. 14 February 1934.

The Reich government has passed the following law, which is hereby promulgated:

§ 1

(1) The Reichsrat is dissolved.

(2) The representation of the states at the Reich ceases to exist.

§ 2

(1) The participation of the Reichsrat in legislation and administration ceases.

(2) Insofar as the Reichsrat was active independently, the responsible Reich Minister or the position determined by him in consultation with the Reich Minister of the Interior shall take its place.

(3) The participation of persons authorized to the Reichsrat in corporations, courts and organs of any kind is withdrawn.

§ 3

The competent Reich ministers are authorized to make supplementary provisions in agreement with the Reich Minister of the Interior and to take into account the changes resulting from this law when promulgating a new version of legal regulations.

Berlin, February 14, 1934.

The Reich Chancellor Adolf Hitler

The Reich Minister of the Interior Frick

== Constitutional legitimacy ==
In accordance with the emergency powers granted to it by the Enabling Act (23 March 1933), the Reich government (i.e., the Reich Chancellor and his cabinet) enacted the law without passage through the Reichstag and without obtaining the signature of Reich President Paul von Hindenburg. On the face of it, the law appeared to be a clear violation of the Enabling Act's Article 2 that specifically safeguarded the existence of the Reichsrat: "Laws enacted by the Reich Cabinet may deviate from the constitution as long as they do not affect the institutions of the Reichstag and the Reichsrat." However, the subsequent Law on the Reconstruction of the Reich (30 January 1934), passed by the Reichstag in the form of a constitutional amendment, contained the following language in Article 4: "The Reich government may issue new constitutional laws." Thus, some have argued that the abolition of the Reichsrat by cabinet law may have adhered to the legal process then in place. A further counterargument advanced by historian Richard J. Evans noted that many of the state governments had been overthrown by the Nazis under the Reichstag Fire Decree, and therefore "were not properly constituted or represented" when the Reichsrat gave its assent to the above laws. Needless to say, these constitutional points concerning the legitimacy of the law were never litigated by the Supreme Judicial Court in Nazi Germany.

== Aftermath ==
Enactment of the law abolished the Reichsrat and formally removed the participation of the German states in national legislation. In reality, this was less significant than it may have seemed on the surface. Whereas the Reichsrat in the past had served as a check on the actions of the Reichstag in Weimar Germany, by 1934 this was no longer the case. Once the Nazis had secured control of the governments of the German states, they used this power to appoint their adherents as the state representatives to the Reichsrat. One need look no further than the Reichsrat action in passing the Enabling Act on the evening of 23 March 1933, where "proceedings only occupied a few minutes, unanimous approval being given without a debate" to see that it no longer served as an independent and deliberative legislative body but was now reduced to "rubber stamp" status. The states would not recover their national legislative function until May 1949 when the Basic Law of the Federal Republic of Germany made provisions for a Bundesrat, which became the successor organization to the Reichsrat.

== Sources ==
- Evans, Richard J. (2005). The Coming of the Third Reich. New York: Penguin Books. ISBN 978-0-143-03469-8.
- Fergusson, Gilbert (April 1964). "A Blueprint for Dictatorship. Hitler's Enabling Law of March 1933". International Affairs. 40 (2): 256.
- Wells, Roger H. (April 1936). "The Liquidation of the German Länder". The American Political Science Review. 30 (2). American Political Science Association: 350–361. doi:10.2307/1947263. JSTOR 1947263. S2CID 147621323.
- Zentner, Christian; Bedürftig, Friedemann, eds. (1997) [1991]. The Encyclopedia of the Third Reich. New York: Da Capo Press. ISBN 978-0-306-80793-0.
