= States of Germany (disambiguation) =

The States of Germany are the sixteen current states of Germany.

States of Germany may also refer to:

- List of states in the Holy Roman Empire, the states of the Holy Roman Empire between 962 and 1806
- States of the German Confederation, member states of the German Confederation between 1815 and 1866
- States of the German Empire (1871–1918)
- States of the Weimar Republic
- Administrative divisions of East Germany
