= Article 48 of the Weimar Constitution =

Provision of the constitution of the Weimar Republic of Germany (1919–1933)

Article 48 of the constitution of the Weimar Republic of Germany (1919–1933) allowed the Reich president, under certain circumstances, to take emergency measures without the prior consent of the Reichstag. This power came to be understood to include the promulgation of emergency decrees. It was used frequently by Reich President Friedrich Ebert of the Social Democratic Party to deal with both political unrest and economic emergencies. Later, under President Paul von Hindenburg and the presidential cabinets, Article 48 was called on more and more often to bypass a politically fractured parliament and to rule without its consent. Following the Nazi Party's rise to power in the early 1930s, the law allowed Chancellor Adolf Hitler, with decrees issued by Hindenburg, to create a totalitarian dictatorship by seemingly legal means.

== Text ==
Artikel 48	Article 48
§1 Wenn ein Land die ihm nach der Reichsverfassung oder den Reichsgesetzen obliegenden Pflichten nicht erfüllt, kann der Reichspräsident es dazu mit Hilfe der bewaffneten Macht anhalten.	§1 In the event of a State (Note: The German term Land translates into English most appropriately as "state", as Weimar Germany, like Germany under the monarchy until 1918 and the modern Federal Republic, was a federation consisting of several Länder with some degree of autonomy.) not fulfilling the obligations imposed upon it by the Reich (Note: Reich translates literally as "empire" or "realm". The term persisted even after the end of the monarchy in 1918. The German state's official name was therefore Deutsches Reich through the Weimar Republic and to the end of World War II.) Constitution or by the laws of the Reich, the president of the Reich may make use of the armed forces to compel it to do so.
§2 Der Reichspräsident kann, wenn im Deutschen Reiche die öffentliche Sicherheit und Ordnung erheblich gestört oder gefährdet wird, die zur Wiederherstellung der öffentlichen Sicherheit und Ordnung nötigen Maßnahmen treffen, erforderlichenfalls mit Hilfe der bewaffneten Macht einschreiten. Zu diesem Zwecke darf er vorübergehend die in den Artikeln 114, 115, 117, 118, 123, 124 und 153 festgesetzten Grundrechte ganz oder zum Teil außer Kraft setzen.	§2 If public security and order are seriously disturbed or endangered within the German Reich, the president of the Reich may take measures necessary for their restoration, intervening if need be with the assistance of the armed forces. For this purpose he may suspend for a while, in whole or in part, the fundamental rights provided in Articles 114 (Note: "Liberty of the person is inviolable. A restriction upon, or deprivation of, personal liberty, may not be imposed by public authority except by law. Persons who have been deprived of their liberty must be informed no later than the following day by what authority, and upon what grounds, the deprivation of liberty was ordered; without delay they shall have the opportunity to lodge objections against such deprivation of liberty."), 115 (Note: "The dwelling of every German is his sanctuary and is inviolable. Exceptions may be imposed only by authority of law."), 117 (Note: "Secrecy of postal, telegraphic, and telephonic communication is inviolable. Exceptions may be permitted only by a national law."), 118 (Note: "Every German has the right within the limits of the general laws, to express his opinion orally, in writing, in print, pictorially, or in any other way. No circumstance arising out of his work or employment shall hinder him in the exercise of this right, and no one shall discriminate against him if he makes use of such right. No censorship shall be established, but exceptional provisions may be made by law for cinematographs. Moreover, legal measures are permissible for the suppression of indecent and obscene literature, as well as for the protection of youth at public plays and exhibitions."), 123 (Note: "All Germans have the right to assemble peaceably and unarmed without notice or special permission. By national law notice may be required for meetings in the open air, and they may be prohibited in case of immediate danger to the public safety."), 124 (Note: "All Germans have the right to form societies or associations for purposes not prohibited by the criminal code. This right may not be limited by preventive regulations. The same provision applies to religious societies and associations. Every association has the right to incorporate according to the provisions of the civil code. Such right may not be denied to an association on the ground that its purpose is political, social, or religious.") and 153 (Note: "Property shall be guaranteed by the constitution. Its nature and limits shall be prescribed by law. Expropriation shall take place only for the general good and only on the basis of law. It shall be accompanied by payment of just compensation unless otherwise provided by national law. In case of dispute over the amount of compensation recourse to the ordinary courts shall be permitted, unless otherwise provided by national law. Expropriation by the Reich over against the states, municipalities, and associations serving the public welfare may take place only upon the payment of compensation. Property imposes obligations. Its use by its owner shall at the same time serve the public good.").
§3 Von allen gemäß Abs. 1 oder Abs. 2 dieses Artikels getroffenen Maßnahmen hat der Reichspräsident unverzüglich dem Reichstag Kenntnis zu geben. Die Maßnahmen sind auf Verlangen des Reichstags außer Kraft zu setzen.	§3 The president of the Reich must inform the Reichstag without delay of all measures taken in accordance with Paragraphs 1 or 2 of this Article. These measures are to be revoked on the demand of the Reichstag.
§4 Bei Gefahr im Verzuge kann die Landesregierung für ihr Gebiet einstweilige Maßnahmen der in Abs. 2 bezeichneten Art treffen. Die Maßnahmen sind auf Verlangen des Reichspräsidenten oder des Reichstags außer Kraft zu setzen.	§4 If danger is imminent, a State government may, for its own territory, take temporary measures as provided in Paragraph 2. These measures are to be revoked on the demand of the president of the Reich or of the Reichstag.
§5 Das Nähere bestimmt ein Reichsgesetz.	§5 Details are to be determined by a law of the Reich. (Note: No such law was ever enacted.)

== History ==
=== Background ===
The Weimar National Assembly, which was responsible for writing a constitution for a new, democratic Germany following the overthrow of the Hohenzollern monarchy at the end of World War I, had the task of producing a document that would be accepted by both conservatives who wanted to keep the semi-constitutional monarchy of the Empire and people on the left who were looking for a socialist or even communist government. The Weimar Constitution's framers intended Article 48 to allow a strong executive within the parliamentary republic that could bypass the slower legislative process in times of crisis.

The article allowed the Reich president to use the armed forces to compel any federal state to obey the lawful obligations placed on it by the Reich government. In addition, if "security and order" were endangered, the president could take measures, including use of the military, to restore order; he could also suspend certain enumerated fundamental rights: personal liberty, inviolability of the home, of the mail and other communications, freedom of speech, freedom of assembly and of association, and the inviolability of property. The president had to inform the Reichstag of any such measures, and the Reichstag could revoke them by a majority vote. Since under Article 50 of the Weimar Constitution the president's decrees had to be counter-signed by the chancellor or "competent national minister", use of Article 48 required agreement between president and chancellor. There was to be a law passed by the parliament to determine the "details" of the powers granted the president, but none was ever written.

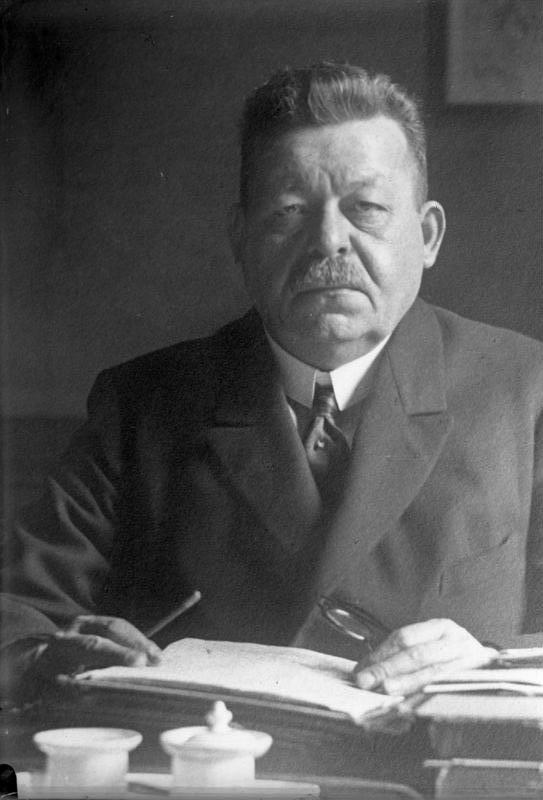
Friedrich Ebert, the first president of the Weimar Republic. His 136 invocations of Article 48 were by agreement with Parliament.

=== Under President Ebert ===
In the early years of the Republic, following the signing of the Treaty of Versailles in June 1919, the combination of reparations payments, the occupation of the Ruhr by French and Belgian troops between 1921 and 1923, and the resulting hyperinflation led to economic turmoil and political unrest from both the left and right. To cope with the crises, Friedrich Ebert, a Social Democrat and the Republic's first president, used Article 48 on 136 occasions, although he always based invoking the act on agreements between himself, the government and parliament. In October 1923, when the Communist Party of Germany entered the Social Democratic-led governments of Saxony and Thuringia with hidden revolutionary intentions, Ebert used a Reichsexekution under Article 48 to send troops into the two states to remove the Communists from the governments. Ebert later granted Chancellor Wilhelm Cuno considerable latitude under Article 48 to deal with inflation and matters related to the Reichsmark. It was a more controversial use of the power because it was not clear that the constitutional article was meant to be used to handle economic issues. The Emminger Reform of 4 January 1924 also used Article 48 to abolish the jury system as a cost saving measure and replace it with the mixed system of judges and lay judges that still exists today.

=== Under President Hindenburg ===
Article 48 was used by President Paul von Hindenburg in 1930 to deal with the effects of the Great Depression in Germany. During the spring and summer, Chancellor Heinrich Brüning found his government unable to obtain a parliamentary majority for its financial reform bill, which was voted down by the Reichstag, but the government did not seriously try to negotiate with the parliament to find a modus vivendi. Instead, Brüning asked Hindenburg to invoke Article 48 in order to promulgate the bill as an emergency decree and thereby give Brüning's government the authority to act without the consent of the Reichstag. When Hindenburg gave his authorization and issued the decree, it was the first time that a bill that had been legislatively rejected was later promulgated by way of executive decree, a tactic whose constitutionality has been questioned. On 18 July 1930 the Reichstag repudiated the decree by a vote of 236 to 221, with the Social Democrats, Nazis, German National People's Party and Communists voting in favor. Under Article 48, the vote by a majority of the Reichstag members invalidated the presidential decree. Brüning then asked Hindenburg to dissolve parliament and call for new elections. The Reichstag was accordingly dissolved on 18 July and new elections were scheduled for 14 September 1930.

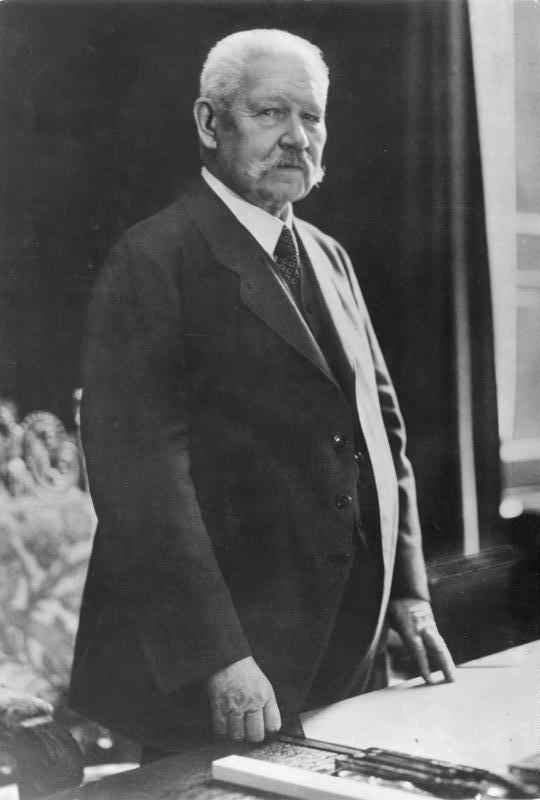
Paul von Hindenburg, the second president of the Weimar Republic. He used Article 48 109 times in three years, largely as a way to bypass parliament.

The September 1930 election resulted in increased representation in the Reichstag for the Communists and, most dramatically the Nazis, at the expense of the moderate middle-class parties. Forming a parliamentary majority became even more difficult for Brüning. In fact, just to conduct the normal business of government, he was forced to invoke Article 48 many more times between 1930 and 1932. Subsequent governments under chancellors Franz von Papen and Kurt von Schleicher during the tumultuous year 1932 obtained decrees from Hindenburg under Article 48 when they too found it impossible to obtain a parliamentary majority as the extremist parties on the left and right gained power. Altogether, Article 48 was invoked by Hindenburg 109 times from 1930 to 1932:

Uses of Article 48 1930–1932
Year	Sitting days of the Reichstag	Laws passed by the Reichstag	Laws passed under Article 48
1930	94	98	5
1931	41	34	44
1932	13	5	60
Totals		137	109

The invocation of Article 48 by successive governments helped seal the fate of the Weimar Republic. While Brüning's first invocation of an emergency decree may have been well-intentioned, the power to rule by decree was increasingly used not in response to a specific emergency but as a substitute for parliamentary leadership. The excessive use of the decree power and the fact that successive chancellors were no longer responsible to the Reichstag probably played a significant part in the loss of public confidence in constitutional democracy, in turn leading to the rise of the extremist parties.

=== Nazi use ===
On 30 January 1933, Adolf Hitler was appointed chancellor. Lacking a majority in the Reichstag, he formed a coalition with the national conservative German National People's Party (DNVP). Not long afterwards, he called elections for 5 March. Six days before the election, on 27 February, the Reichstag fire damaged the house of parliament in Berlin. Claiming that the fire was the first step in a Communist revolution, the Nazis used the fire as a pretext to induce President Hindenburg to sign the Reichstag Fire Decree, officially the Presidential Decree for the Protection of People and State (Verordnung des Reichspräsidenten zum Schutz von Volk und Staat).

Under the decree, which was issued on the basis of Article 48, the government was given authority to curtail constitutional rights including habeas corpus, free expression of opinion, freedom of the press, rights of assembly, and the privacy of postal, telegraphic and telephonic communications. Constitutional restrictions on searches and confiscation of property were likewise rescinded.

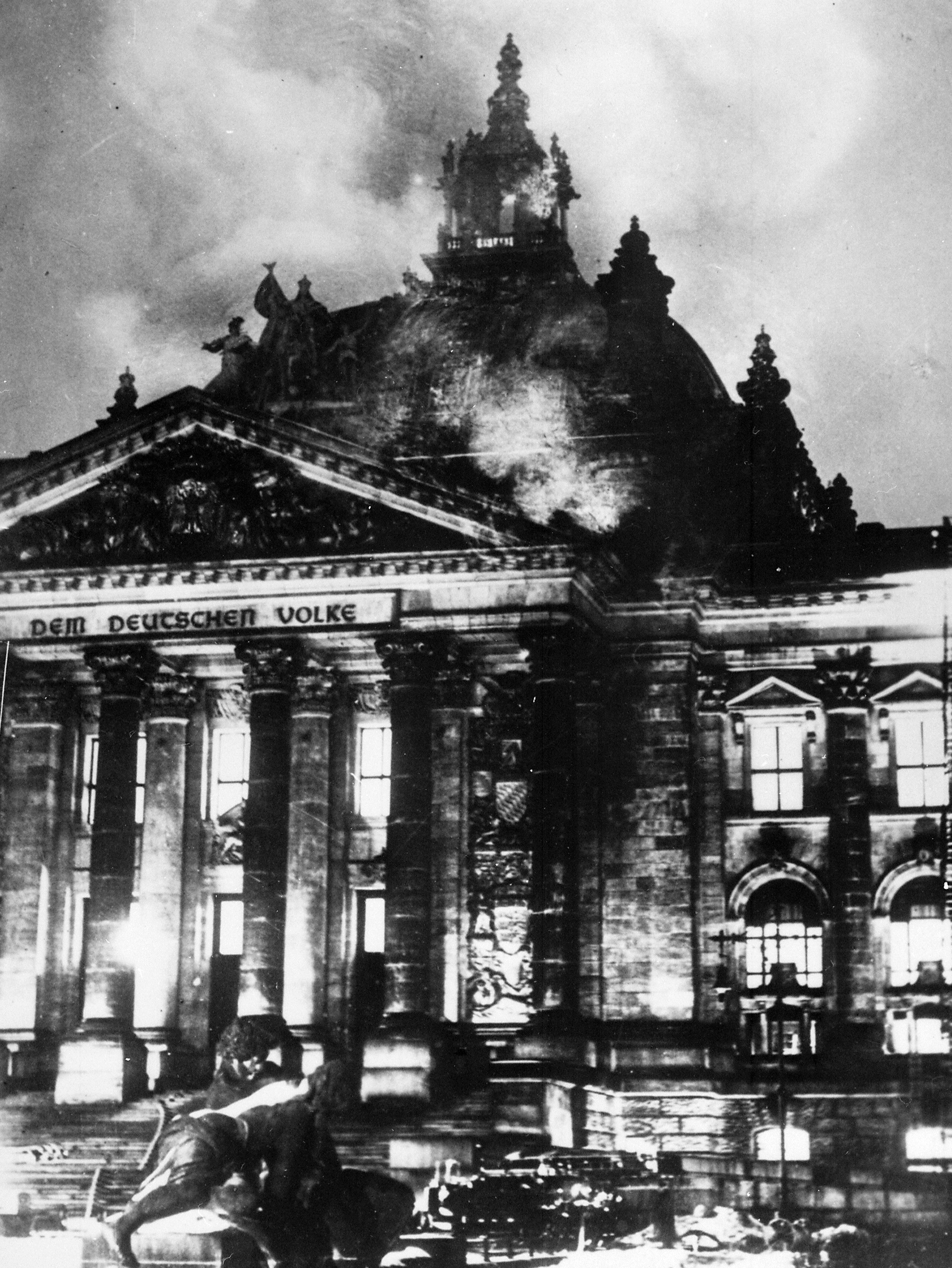
The burning Reichstag building, 27 February 1933. The event gave Hitler an excuse to invoke Article 48, which in turn led to him gaining dictatorial powers by seemingly legal means.

The Reichstag Fire Decree was one of the first steps the Nazis took toward the establishment of a one-party dictatorship in Germany. With key government posts in the hands of Nazis and with the constitutional protections on civil liberties suspended by the decree, the Nazis were able to use their control of the police to intimidate and arrest their opposition, in particular the Communists. Due to the use of Article 48, the repression had the mark of legality.

The 5 March 1933 elections gave the Nazi-DNVP coalition a narrow majority in the Reichstag. On 23 March the Nazis were nevertheless able to maneuver the passage of the Enabling Act by the required two-thirds parliamentary majority, effectively abrogating the authority of the Reichstag and placing its authority in the hands of the cabinet (in effect, the chancellor, Adolf Hitler). This had the effect of giving Hitler dictatorial powers.

Over the years, Hitler used Article 48 to give his dictatorship the stamp of legality. Thousands of his decrees were based explicitly on the Reichstag Fire Decree, and hence on Article 48, allowing Hitler to rule under what amounted to martial law. It was a major reason why Hitler never formally repealed the Weimar Constitution, though it had effectively been rendered a dead letter with the passage of the Enabling Act.

== Effect on post-war constitutions ==
The misuse of Article 48 was fresh in the minds of the framers of the Basic Law for the Federal Republic of Germany. They decided to significantly curb the powers of the president, to the point that the office, unlike its Weimar predecessor, has little de facto executive power. Also, to prevent a government from being forced to rely on decrees to carry on normal business, they stipulated that a chancellor may only be removed from office via a constructive vote of no confidence, which requires that a prospective successor already command a majority before the incumbent chancellor can be voted out.

Article 48 also influenced the framers of the French Constitution of 1958, whose Article 16 similarly allows the president of France to rule by decree in emergencies. The French article, however, includes much stronger safeguards against misuse than was the case in Weimar. The president is required to consult with the prime minister and the presidents of both houses of parliament before issuing emergency decrees; these decrees, in turn, cannot be used to suspend civil rights and liberties, but are instead required to be designed to restore the normal rules of the Constitution. That is, the president cannot use Article 16 as a substitute for parliamentary confidence. Article 16 also prohibits the dissolution of the National Assembly while an emergency is in effect, while the president and sixty members of either house of parliament retain the right to submit emergency decrees to the Constitutional Council, which has the power to invalidate them if the conditions necessary for the article's invocation no longer exist.

Article 48 additionally proved influential in South Korea. The original Constitution of the Republic of Korea granted the President the power to issue decrees having the force of law in case of a civil war, foreign aggression, natural disasters, or a financial crisis. The Korean article stipulated that such powers could not be exercised if there was still time remaining to summon the National Assembly, which needed to approve emergency decrees as soon as possible for them to remain in force.

== Interpretation ==
The text of the Article 48 neither precisely defined the kind of emergency that would justify its use nor expressly granted to the president the power to enact, issue, or otherwise promulgate legislation. However, such an inherent presidential legislative power was clearly implied, since the Article expressly gave the Reichstag the power to cancel the emergency decree by a simple majority vote. This implicit legislative power implied that a decree could, either by its express terms or its operation, impinge on the Reichstag's constitutional function.

Article 48 required the president to inform the Reichstag immediately of the issuance of the emergency decree and gave the Reichstag the power to nullify the emergency decree by simple majority action. The Reichsrat, the upper house, was not involved in the process at all. If the Reichstag nullified the decree, the president could retaliate by using the power granted him under Article 25 to dissolve the Reichstag and call for new elections within 60 days.
