= Reichsrat (Germany) =

German legislative body 1919–1934

Reich Council Reichsrat
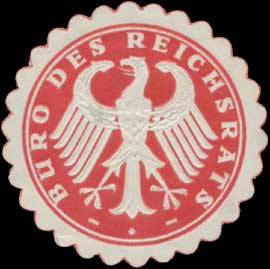
- Bureau of the Reichsrat – sealing stamp

History
- Founded: 14 August 1919; 106 years ago
- Disbanded: 14 February 1934; 92 years ago
- Preceded by: Bundesrat, German Empire
- Succeeded by: West Germany: Bundesrat; East Germany: Länderkammer
- Seats: 63–68

Meeting place
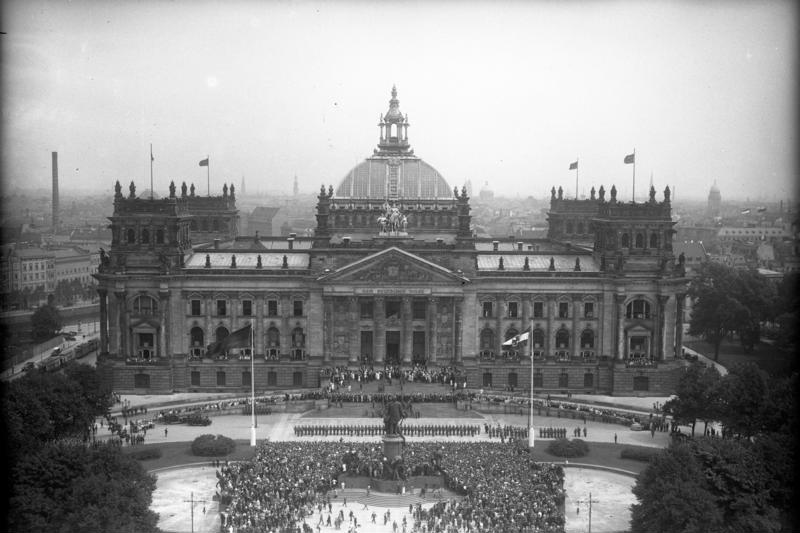
- Reichstag building, Berlin

Constitution
- Constitution of the German Reich

The Reichsrat (German: [ʁaɪ̯çs.ʁaːt], 'Reich Council') was a legislative body during the Weimar Republic. The Reichsrat's members were appointed by the German state governments to represent their interests in the legislation and administration of the nation at the federal level. Its powers were relatively limited, making it considerably weaker than its predecessor, the Bundesrat of the German Empire (1871–1918). It could introduce legislation for the popularly elected Reichstag to consider and veto laws that it passed, but the vetoes could be overridden. The Reichsrat also played a role in administering and implementing Reich laws.

After the Nazi Party took control of Germany in 1933, they centralized all power, including that of the states. The Reichsrat no longer had a function to perform and was abolished by law on 14 February 1934.

== Composition ==
The Reichsrat was composed of representatives of the eighteen German states, whose governments appointed its members. According to Article 63 of the Weimar Constitution, "the states shall be represented in the Reichsrat by members of their ministries". All Reichsrat deputies had an imperative mandate – that is, they were bound by instructions from the governmental body that had appointed them. The number of representatives from the constituent states was based on their population. Article 61 guaranteed each state at least one vote and therefore one member. In the case of larger states, one vote was originally allotted for every one million inhabitants. A Reich law of 24 March 1921 lowered the number to every 700,000 inhabitants and provided that a remainder of at least 350,000 inhabitants be counted as 700,000. No state was allowed to have more than two-fifths of all votes, or members.

Prussia, whose population would have justified it having just over sixty percent of Reichsrat votes, was the only state affected by the two-fifths maximum. Its still strong position was further weakened as of 14 July 1921 when, under a state law referenced in Article 63, half of its members had to be chosen by the provincial associations of the Prussian provinces rather than by the state government. (A Prussian provincial association (Provinzialverband) was a body of local self-government above the municipalities and the rural and urban districts.) This Clausula antiborussica ( "anti-Prussian clause"), by preventing Prussia's state government from exerting too much influence, was intended to achieve a certain fairness with respect to the smaller states that had fewer votes .

== Distribution of votes in the Reichsrat by state ==
	State	15 August 1919	1 May 1920	14 July 1921	15 May 1926	1 April 1929
	Prussia	25	22	26	27	26
	Bavaria	7	7	10	11	11
	Saxony	5	5	7	7	7
	Württemberg	3	3	4	4	4
	Baden	3	3	3	3	3
	Thuringia (Note: Each of seven states (Reuss, Saxe-Altenburg, Saxe-Gotha, Saxe-Meiningen, Saxe-Weimar-Eisenach, Schwarzburg-Rudolstadt and Schwarzburg-Sondershausen) had one seat until 1 May 1920 when they merged to form Thuringia, which was allocated 2 seats.)	7	2	2	2	2
	Hesse	2	2	2	2	2
	Hamburg	1	1	2	2	2
	Anhalt	1	1	1	1	1
	Bremen	1	1	1	1	1
	Brunswick	1	1	1	1	1
	Lippe	1	1	1	1	1
Free City of Lübeck	Lübeck	1	1	1	1	1
	Mecklenburg-Schwerin	1	1	1	1	1
	Mecklenburg-Strelitz	1	1	1	1	1
	Oldenburg	1	1	1	1	1
	Schaumburg-Lippe	1	1	1	1	1
Germany	Waldeck-Pyrmont (Note: On 30 November 1921, Pyrmont merged with Prussia; Waldeck followed on 1 April 1929.)	1	1	1	1	-
	Totals	63	55	66	68	66

== Organization ==
Although the Reichstag was constitutionally required to meet on an annual basis (Article 24), the Reichsrat was convened under the responsibility of the Reich government. The Reichsrat was also chaired by a member of the government (Article 65), usually the minister of the interior.

The Reichsrat could form committees of its members. Those appointed had equal voting rights, although no state could have more than one vote on a committee (Article 62). Within the Reichsrat, every member as well as the members of the Reich government could submit motions; in this respect, it differed from the former Bundesrat, in which the Reich government had no right of initiative. Motions were decided by a simple majority.

== Rights ==
The constitution enumerated relatively few powers for the Reichsrat. It had the right to:

- introduce a bill for consideration, in which case the Reich government was allowed to comment on it. Articles 68 and 69 under the heading 'National Legislation' state:

Article 68: Bills shall be introduced by the National Ministry [the Reich government], or by members of the Reichstag. National laws shall be enacted by the Reichstag. Article 69: The initiation of bills by the National Ministry shall require the consent of the Reichsrat. If the National Ministry and the Reichsrat fail to agree, the National Ministry may, nevertheless, introduce the bill, but must present therewith the dissenting opinion of the Reichsrat. If the Reichsrat passes a bill to which the National Ministry fails to assent, the Ministry must introduce such bill in the Reichstag accompanied by an expression of its views.

- be informed by the Reich government about current government business (Article 67)
- veto legislation passed by the Reichstag, although the veto could be overridden by a two-thirds majority of the Reichstag (Article 74).

== Assessment of its position ==
States of the Weimar Republic. (Note: neither Danzig nor the Saar were parts of the Republic.)

In the tradition of German federalism, the Reichsrat was the institutionalized representation of the interests of the states at the national level. Primarily because it had lost its equal status in the legislative process, the Reichsrat was less important than the imperial Bundesrat, which had nominally been the highest constitutional body of the Empire. It also lost independence because the Reich government was not only in charge but could also introduce legislation directly, whereas the Bundesrat had theoretically been a pure representation of the interests of the state sovereigns (although dominated by Prussia) which the Reich leadership had to follow.

The Reichsrat had the right to advise on and to veto legislation, but the Reichstag could override a veto and was thus nominally the stronger of the two parliamentary bodies. Since the Reichstag had many parties and it was not easy to unify two-thirds of the votes, the governing parties in the Reichstag usually tried to reach an agreement with the Reichsrat in advance. The fact that the chairman of the Reichsrat was a member of the Reich government also curtailed the Reichsrat's sovereign rights: it could be convened only if one third of its members requested it of the Reich government (Article 64). Because the chairman of the Reichsrat was a government minister, the Reich also had a determining influence on the course of the Reichrat's business.

The Reichsrat was not a purely legislative body. Since it was required to approve the majority of governmental acts (Verordnungen), it also participated in the administration of the Reich. As a result, the states, supported by the expertise of their ministerial bureaucracies, were able to exert considerable influence on the implementation of Reich laws, which they also usually executed on their own authority. Due to the relative stability of the state governments, the Reichsrat was seen as one of the last firm anchors of Weimar institutions, especially in the final phase of the Republic when the Reichstag was increasingly unable to act.

The weakening of the Reichsrat in comparison to its position under the constitution of the German Empire is part of the generally more centralized nature of the Weimar Constitution, which significantly expanded the Reich's legislative authority and its supervisory rights over the states. The "sovereignty of the Reich over the states" that was then assumed in constitutional law, together with Finance Minister Matthias Erzberger's reforms of 1919/20 which introduced a national income tax, led to a significant weakening of the position of the constituent states that was not reversed until the constitution of the Federal Republic of Germany came into force in 1949. Its Bundesrat is modeled on the Reichsrat in its composition and competencies. Compared to the Reichsrat, the Bundesrat of the Federal Republic has a stronger position with regard to laws that require its approval (Zustimmungsgesetze), over which it has an absolute right of veto, but a weaker one with regard to laws that do not (Einspruchsgesetze). The Bundesrat can veto them, but the Bundestag can override with a simple majority.

== End under National Socialism ==
In the course of the National Socialist takeover in 1933, the states of the German Reich went through the process of Gleichschaltung (Nazification). Prussia had been taken over by the government under Reich chancellor Franz von Papen in the 1932 Prussian coup d'état; on the basis of the Reichstag Fire Decree of 28 February 1933, the new Nazi regime set up governments led by appointed Reich commissioners in all the states. Since the commissioners appointed members of the Reichsrat, the Nazis quickly had a large majority that it then used to rubber stamp the Enabling Act passed by the Reichstag on 24 March 1933. The act allowed Hitler as chancellor to make and enforce laws without the involvement of the parliament.

The Provisional Law on the Coordination of the States with the Reich of 31 March 1933 significantly curtailed the influence of the state parliaments. With the Law on the Reconstruction of the Reich (Gesetz über den Neuaufbau des Reichs) of 30 January 1934, the state parliaments were abolished and the sovereign rights of the states transferred to the Reich. Since the law affected the constitution, the Reichsrat, which by that point consisted only of Nazi representatives, had to approve it. It did so in its last session on 30 January 1934. Since the states were now only administrative units of the central state, their representation had lost its meaning. The Reichsrat's abolition was then possible since the Law on the Reconstruction of the Reich gave the Reich government the right to determine constitutional law. The Reich government formally dissolved the Reichsrat on 14 February 1934 through the Law on the Abolition of the Reichsrat (Gesetz über die Aufhebung des Reichsrats). Under the centralized Nazi regime, there was no longer any place for a chamber representing the states.

== After World War II ==
In the Federal Republic of Germany, the Bundesrat has represented the states since 1949. In the former German Democratic Republic (East Germany) the Chamber of States (Länderkammer) carried out the function from 1949 to 1958.
