= States of the Weimar Republic =

Federated German states (1918–1935)

Map showing the states of the Weimar Republic, along with the provinces of Prussia (in blue)

The states of the Weimar Republic were the first-level administrative divisions and constituent states of the Weimar Republic. The states were established in 1918–1920 following the German Empire's defeat in World War I and the territorial losses that came with it. They were based on the 22 states and three city-states of the German Empire. During the revolution of 1918–1919, the states abolished their local monarchies and adopted republican constitutions.

Several attempts were made to reorganize the states under the Weimar Republic, particularly because of Prussia's disproportionately large size and influence, but the attempts were unsuccessful. The one significant change was the formation of Thuringia from a number of smaller states.

The Weimar Constitution created a federal republic with certain basic powers reserved for the federal government, some powers shared between the central government and the states, and the remainder in the hands of the states. The federal government was given the power in Article 48 of the Constitution to use its armed forces against states that did not fulfill their obligations under Germany's laws. The power was used four times during the life of the Republic. In its early years, the Weimar Republic also saw a number of separatist movements and attempts to set up soviet-style governments, but all of them were short lived.

== Historical background ==
=== German Empire ===
The German Empire (1871–1918) was a federal monarchy made up in 1918 of 25 constituent states (4 kingdoms, 6 grand duchies, 5 duchies, 7 principalities, 3 free cities) and one imperial territory. Its federal structure reflected its formation in 1871 under the leadership of the Kingdom of Prussia from the combination of the loosely federal North German Confederation with Saxony, Bavaria, Württemberg, Baden and the southern part of Hesse.

Following the German Empire's defeat in World War I, the victorious Allied powers in the Treaty of Versailles reduced Germany's size by 65,000 sq km (25,000 sq mi), or about 13% of its former territory. The areas that were lost had about 7 million inhabitants, or 12% of imperial Germany's population. The affected regions, with the exception of Danzig and the Saar, all had significant non-German speaking populations (primarily Polish, French and Danish).

The Saar Basin was occupied and governed jointly by the United Kingdom and France from 1920 to 1935 under a League of Nations mandate. After a plebiscite was held in January 1935, the region was returned to Germany.

In accordance with the Treaty of Versailles, the city of Danzig (now Gdańsk, Poland) was detached from Germany on 15 November 1920 and turned into a semi-autonomous city-state under the protection of the League of Nations. The Treaty stated that it was to remain separate from both Germany and the newly independent Poland, but it was not a sovereign state.

The 22 ruling dynasties of Germany's constituent states (excluding the city-states, which had no monarchs) were driven out during the German revolution of 1918–1919 and all royalty abolished by the new Weimar Constitution (Article 109). The states themselves nevertheless initially all survived into the Weimar Republic. The only exception was Alsace–Lorraine, an imperial territory (Reichsland) rather than a formal state, which was returned to France from which it had been taken following Prussia's victory in the 1870–1871 Franco-Prussian War.

== Weimar Constitution ==
=== Early attempts at geographic reforms ===
Proposal to reorganise Germany into 14 states drawn up by Hugo Preuß as part of the discussions on a new constitution. The 14th state, not shown here, was German-Austria.

The Council of the People's Deputies, Germany's immediate post-war revolutionary government, commissioned the liberal political theorist and legal expert Hugo Preuss to draft a new constitution for Germany. Since there was considerable concern about the dominating size of Prussia, which had two-thirds of Germany's area and three-fifths of its population, Preuss suggested that Germany be restructured into 14 constituent states of more equal sizes (one of which was German-Austria, which wished to become part of Germany after the collapse of the Austro-Hungarian Empire). All would have had at least two million inhabitants, and only Baden would have remained completely unchanged. Preuss' reform proposal failed in the Weimar National Assembly, which adopted the Weimar Constitution. Objections came primarily from the states that would have been renamed. Many Germans still felt strong ties to their home states.

Two additional reform proposals were discussed and rejected during constitutional deliberations. One would have done away with the states altogether – in Preuss' words it would create a "decentralised unitary state with strengthened self-governing bodies". The other reform proposed that the Bundesrat, the Empire's parliamentary body with members appointed by the state governments to represent their interests, be modified to have popularly elected representatives on the model of the U.S. Senate. After that proposal also failed to pass the National Assembly, it decided that the members of the Weimar Republic's Reichsrat would continue to be appointed by the state governments, although the body had fewer powers overall than the imperial Bundesrat.

=== Federal-state relationships ===
For the text of the constitutional articles, see Weimar_constitution – via Wikisource.

The Weimar Constitution indirectly fixed the boundaries of the states in their unchanged locations through the statement in Article 2 that "the territory of the Reich consists of the territories of the German states". The article also allowed for new states to be incorporated into Germany – providing an opening for German-Austria – "by virtue of the right of self-determination". Article 18 set the conditions for changes to state boundaries. If such a change was made by means of a law passed altering the constitution (which required a two-thirds majority vote in the Reichstag), it could be accomplished without the consent of the affected state governments or populations. If the state governments involved agreed to a boundary change, it could become effective by the passage of an ordinary national law (i.e. with a simple majority vote in the Reichstag). Alternatively, a popular referendum could change state boundaries if it was approved by three-fifths of the votes cast and at least half of those eligible to vote, The high bar for changing the configuration of the states reflected the level of resistance to such alterations. Article 18 was suspended for two years after the constitution was approved and came into force only on 10 July 1922.

Every state was required to have a republican constitution (Article 17) with a representative body "elected by universal, equal, direct, and secret suffrage of all German citizens of either sex, according to the principles of proportional representation". As at the national level, the state ministry had to have the confidence of the representative body.

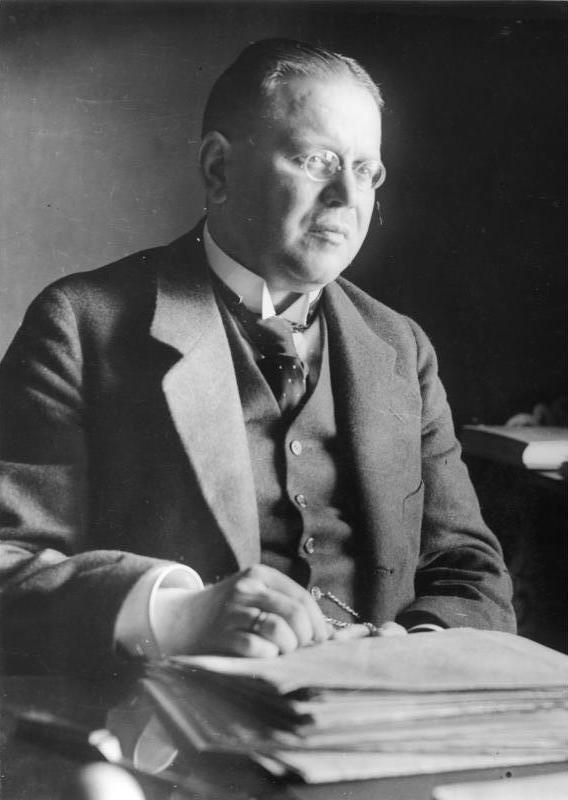
Matthias Erzberger, whose finance reforms weakened the states in the federal system

Article 12 granted the states the power of legislation in all areas in which the federal government did not make use of its own powers. Within that limitation, national laws took precedence over state laws (Article 13). The seven areas in which the federal government had sole power of legislation (such as national defence and foreign relations) were enumerated in Article 6, while Article 7 listed twenty additional areas in which it could legislate (including civil and criminal law, judicial procedure, the press, the right of assembly, commerce and a number of social issues such as "poor relief" and public health). The federal government could also legislate on taxes and revenue "in so far as they are claimed in whole or in part for its purposes" (Article 8). In July 1919, however, Finance Minister Matthias Erzberger pushed through a financial reform package that permanently strengthened the federal government at the expense of the states by giving it exclusive financial sovereignty and thus freeing it from dependence on the states as had been the case under the Empire.

A Supreme Judicial Court would handle constitutional disagreements between the national and state governments and between individual state governments (Articles 13 and 19).

==== Reichsrat ====
The Reichsrat, the upper house of the German parliament, represented the interests of the states at the federal level. It could introduce legislation, and its agreement was required on laws passed by the Reichstag. Members of the Reichsrat were appointed by the state government and when they voted were bound by its instructions (imperative mandate). The number of representatives that a state had in the Reichsrat was determined by population, with every state having at least one representative but none more than 40% of the total. The latter clause limited Prussia's influence, since over 60% of the German population lived in Prussia.

==== Federal use of force against a state ====
In the controversial Article 48 of the Weimar Constitution, the president of Germany was given broad emergency powers, including the ability to call in the military against a state in breach of federal laws:

§1 In the event of a State not fulfilling the obligations imposed upon it by the Reich Constitution or by the laws of the Reich, the president of the Reich may make use of the armed forces to compel it to do so.

The power of the president to use military force against a state was known as a Reich execution and was used four times during the Weimar Republic:

- in March 1920 against various radical left governments in the region that became Thuringia in May 1920
- in April 1920 against Saxe-Gotha (part of the future Thuringia) when it persisted in its attempts to set up a council republic instead of a parliamentary republic as required by the Constitution
- in March 1923 against Saxony, where there was a plan in place to foment a communist revolution in Germany (the German October)
- in July 1932 against Prussia, when Chancellor Franz von Papen used the excuse of outbreaks of violence in Prussia to have the national government take control of the state (the Prussian coup d'état)

== Boundary changes under the Weimar Constitution ==
Thuringia in 1910

Four changes in state boundaries occurred following the implementation of the Weimar Constitution on 14 August 1919:

- The Free State of Thuringia was created on 1 May 1920 from Saxe-Weimar-Eisenach, Saxe-Gotha, Saxe-Meiningen, Saxe-Altenburg, Schwarzburg-Rudolstadt, Schwarzburg-Sondershausen, and Reuss. Erfurt, today the capital of Thuringia, remained part of the Free State of Prussia.
- Saxe-Coburg, historically closely tied to Saxe-Gotha, became part of the Free State of Bavaria on 1 May 1920.
- Pyrmont, formerly part of the Principality of Waldeck-Pyrmont, joined Prussia on 1 April 1922.
- Waldeck followed Pyrmont to become part of Prussia on 1 April 1929.

The Weimar Republic also saw three popular referendums that would have changed state boundaries. All of them failed:

- Upper Silesia, after the 1921 plebiscite required by the Treaty of Versailles that split the region between Germany and Poland, held a referendum to separate Upper Silesia from Prussia. It failed with 72% no votes on 3 September 1922.
- Hanover's attempt to separate from Prussia and form an independent state failed on 18 May 1924 due to insufficient voter turnout.
- Schaumburg-Lippe's residents voted in favour of joining Prussia 6 June 1926, but since the yes votes did not reach the required three-fifths majority, the referendum failed.

In addition, Hamburg's government made several unsuccessful attempts in the 1920s to expand the growing city-state by incorporating immediately surrounding areas that were part of Prussia. It was not until the Greater Hamburg Act of 1937, under the Nazi regime, that Hamburg was expanded to encompass the full urbanized area.

== Unrecognized states ==
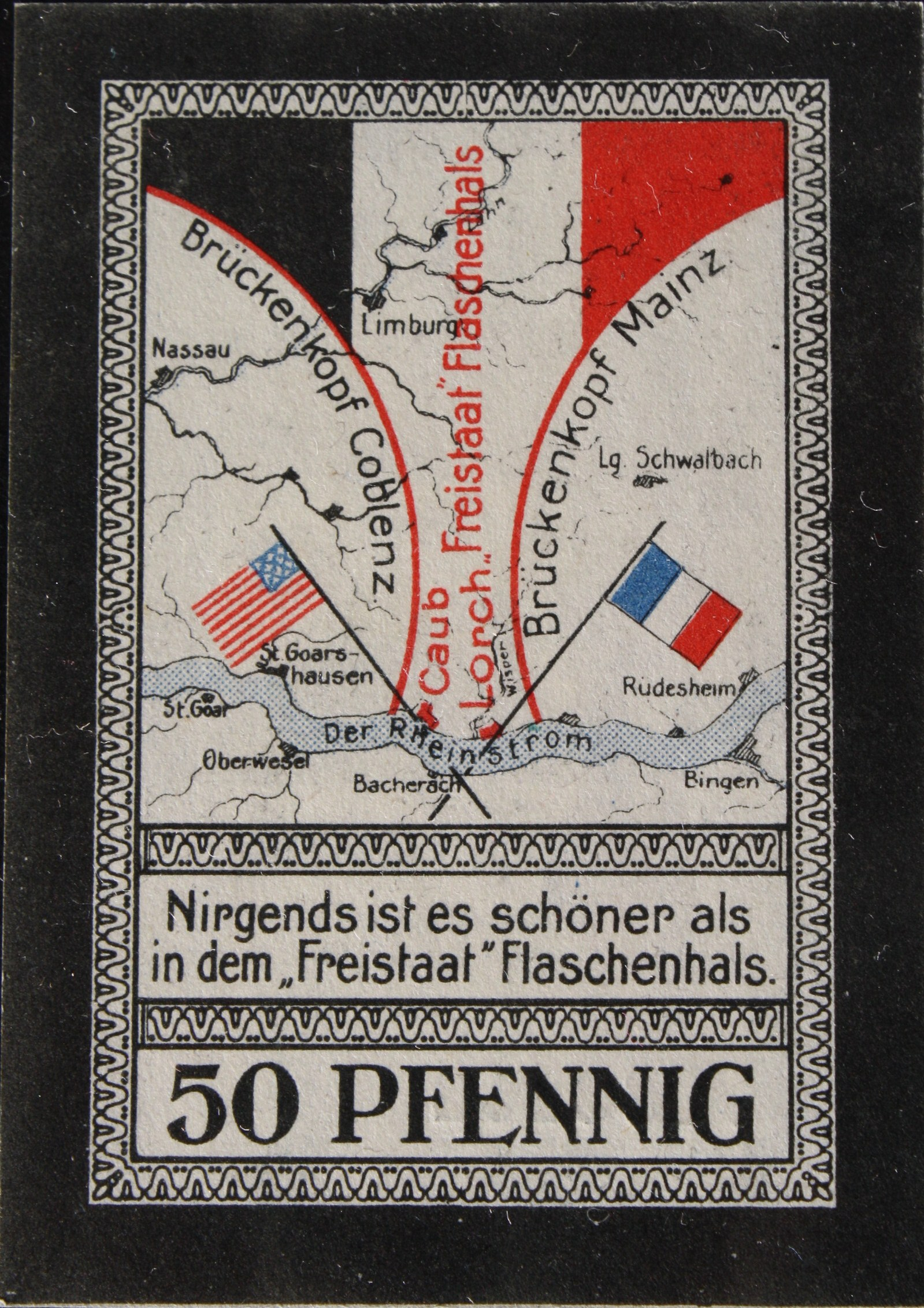
Emergency money of the Free State of Bottleneck. The text reads: "Nowhere is it more beautiful than in the Free State of Bottleneck".

During the turbulent early years of the Weimar Republic, there were a number of short-lived attempts to set up soviet-style republics:

- People's State of Bavaria (8 November 1918 – 6 April 1919)
- Bremen Soviet Republic (10 January – 4 February 1919)
- Bavarian Soviet Republic (6 April 1919 – 3 May 1919)
- Würzburg Soviet Republic (7–9 April 1919)

Separatist movements in the Rhine Province of Prussia led to two short-lived republics during the Occupation of the Ruhr. Both received material and propaganda support from France:

- Rhenish Republic (21 October 1923 – 16 November 1923)
- Palatinate Republic (12 November 1923 – 17 February 1924)

Finally, there was the Free State of Bottleneck (Freistaat Flaschenhals) (10 January 1919 – 25 February 1923), a bottleneck-shaped area formed during the Occupation of the Rhineland by the near convergence of the semi-circular bridgeheads east of the Rhine around Koblenz and Mainz.

== List of states ==

States of the Weimar Republic
	State	Capital	Area in km²	Population
	Anhalt	Dessau	2,314	351,000
	Baden	Karlsruhe	15,070	2,312,000
	Bavaria	Munich	75,996	7,380,000
	Bremen	Bremen	258	339,000
	Brunswick	Brunswick	3,672	502,000
	Coburg (Note: Merged into Bavaria in 1920)	Coburg	562	74,000
	Hamburg	Hamburg	415	1,153,000
	Hesse	Darmstadt	7,692	1,347,000
	Lippe	Detmold	1,215	164,000
Free City of Lübeck	Lübeck	Lübeck	298	128,000
	Mecklenburg-Schwerin	Schwerin	13,127	674,000
	Mecklenburg-Strelitz	Neustrelitz	2,930	110,000
	Oldenburg	Oldenburg	6,427	545,000
	Prussia	Berlin	291,700	38,120,000
	Saxony	Dresden	14,986	4,994,000
	Schaumburg-Lippe	Bückeburg	340	48,000
	Thuringia (Note: Established 1920)	Weimar	11,763	1,607,000
Germany	Waldeck-Pyrmont (Note: Pyrmont merged into Prussia in 1921; Waldeck followed in 1929)	Arolsen	1,055	56,000
	Württemberg	Stuttgart	19,508	2,580,000

States that merged to form Thuringia in 1920
State	Capital	Area in km²	Population
Reuss	Gera	1,143	211,000
Saxe-Altenburg	Altenburg	1,323	210,000
Saxe-Gotha	Gotha	1,415	189,000
Saxe-Meiningen	Meiningen	2,468	275,000
Saxe-Weimar-Eisenach	Weimar	3,610	430,000
Schwarzburg-Rudolstadt	Rudolstadt	941	98,000
Schwarzburg-Sondershausen	Sondershausen	862	93,000

== States under Nazi Germany ==
The states of the Weimar Republic were effectively abolished after the establishment of Nazi Germany in 1933 by a series of laws and decrees between 1933 and 1935, and autonomy was replaced by direct rule of the National Socialist German Workers' Party in the Gleichschaltung process. The states continued to formally exist as de jure bodies but from 1934 were superseded by de facto Nazi Party administrative units called Gaue. Many of the states were formally dissolved at the end of World War II by the Allies, and ultimately re-organised into the modern states of Germany.

== See also ==
- Provinces of Prussia
- States of the German Confederation
- States of the German Empire
- List of German monarchs in 1918
- Administrative divisions of Nazi Germany
- Administrative divisions of East Germany
- States of Germany
