= States of the German Empire =

Federated states of the German Empire

The German Empire was a federation of 25 constituent states plus the imperial territory of Alsace–Lorraine. The states were the successors of the over 300 individual political entities of numerous types and sizes that had existed under the Holy Roman Empire of the German Nation. They were consolidated during the Napoleonic Wars of 1803–1815 and then again through the process of German unification (1866–1871).

The Constitution of the German Empire was strongly federal. It left most matters concerning administration, justice, schools, churches, election laws and finance to the states. The Empire's upper house, the Bundesrat, consisted of members appointed by the states to represent their interests in parliament.

The Empire's federalism was maintained in its successor state, the Weimar Republic, and in today's Federal Republic of Germany.

== Historical background ==
The German Empire's federal structure differed markedly from those of the more centralized European powers of the time such as England and France. Historian Thomas Nipperdey went so far as to call the Empire's federalism the "central fact of its existence". Most of the territory that became the German Empire in 1871 had been part of the highly fragmented Holy Roman Empire (800–1806). At the outbreak of the Napoleonic Wars of 1803–1815, it was made up of over 300 individual states ranging in size and type from tiny imperial abbeys to relatively large duchies and principalities; all of them were subject to the Holy Roman Emperor in Vienna (since 1745). In 1803, Napoleon abolished 112 of the smallest entities (via the Reichsdeputationshauptschluss) by combining them with neighboring states. The Holy Roman Empire – often called the Holy Roman Empire of the German Nation after 1512 – was itself dissolved in 1806. At the same time, the German states except Austria and Prussia were consolidated further and incorporated into a French client state, the Confederation of the Rhine.

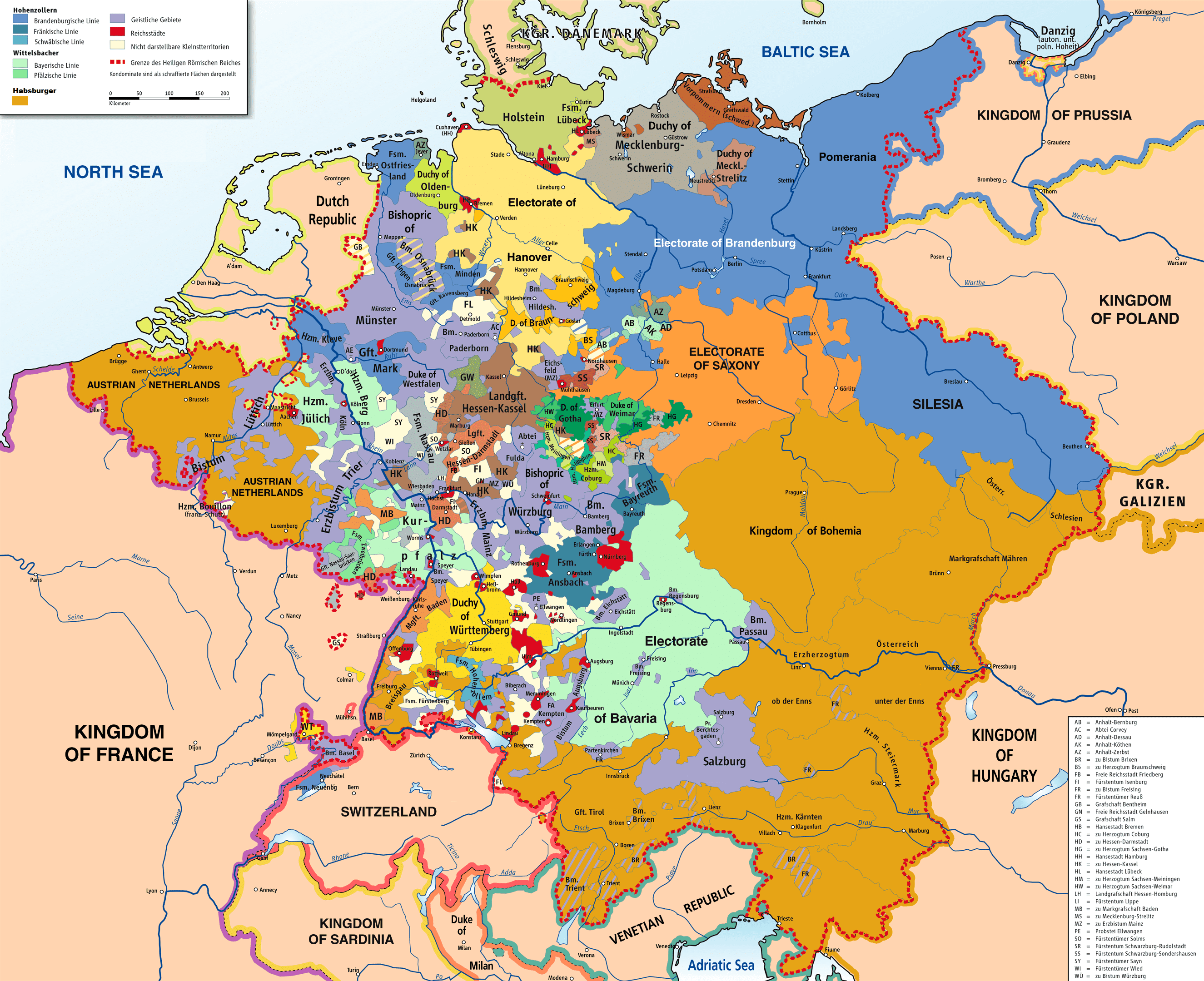
The Holy Roman Empire in 1789, showing its fractured makeup. The major exceptions were Prussia (darkest blue) and the Habsburg holdings (orange).

After Napoleon's defeat, the Congress of Vienna (1814–1815) created the 39-state German Confederation, which included Austria and Prussia along with the states that had made up the Confederation of the Rhine. It was a loose federation formed primarily for defensive purposes and lacked both a central executive and judiciary. Its strongly federal structure was emphasized in the second article of its constitution which guaranteed "the independence and inviolability of the confederated States". The German Confederation was replaced by the North German Confederation in 1866 after Prussia defeated Austria in the Austro-Prussian War. Its 22 states, dominated by Prussia, were north of the Main River and notably excluded Austria. The upper chamber of the North German Confederation's parliament, the Bundesrat, was made up of representatives appointed by the states and was the Confederation's federal authority.

In the aftermath of the Franco-Prussian War of 1870–1871, the states south of the Main – Baden, Upper Hesse, Bavaria and Württemberg – joined the North German Confederation to form the German Empire and complete the unification of Germany. The new empire was a federation of 25 kingdoms, duchies, principalities, free cities and the imperial territory of Alsace–Lorraine. Its constitution contained only relatively minor modifications to the Constitution of the North German Confederation and remained strongly federalized, with the Bundesrat as the upper chamber of parliament and significant particularist concessions ("reserve rights") granted to some of the larger constituent states (see section below). Both constitutions were largely the work of the Empire's first chancellor, Otto von Bismarck.

== The states in the constitution ==
The first article of the imperial constitution enumerated the 25 states of the "federal region" (Bundesgebiet) that made up the Empire. Alsace–Lorraine, which had been won from France at the end of the Franco-Prussian War, was added as an imperial territory by a law of 25 June 1873. The constitution set the number of seats each state was to have in both the Reichstag and the Bundesrat (see table below). In the Reichstag, seat distribution for the states that had been part of the North German Confederation was taken from a law of 31 May 1869. It had allocated one seat for each 100,000 inhabitants; the same ratio was applied to the new states south of the Main and to Alsace–Lorraine, which was granted 15 seats when it became an imperial territory. The constitution made indirect reference to future census counts to adjust seat distribution, but they were never carried out. As a result of population shifts, particularly from rural areas to large urban centers, the number of residents per Reichstag district varied considerably by the end of the Empire in 1918, although at the state level (especially the larger ones), the lack of redistricting had relatively little effect.

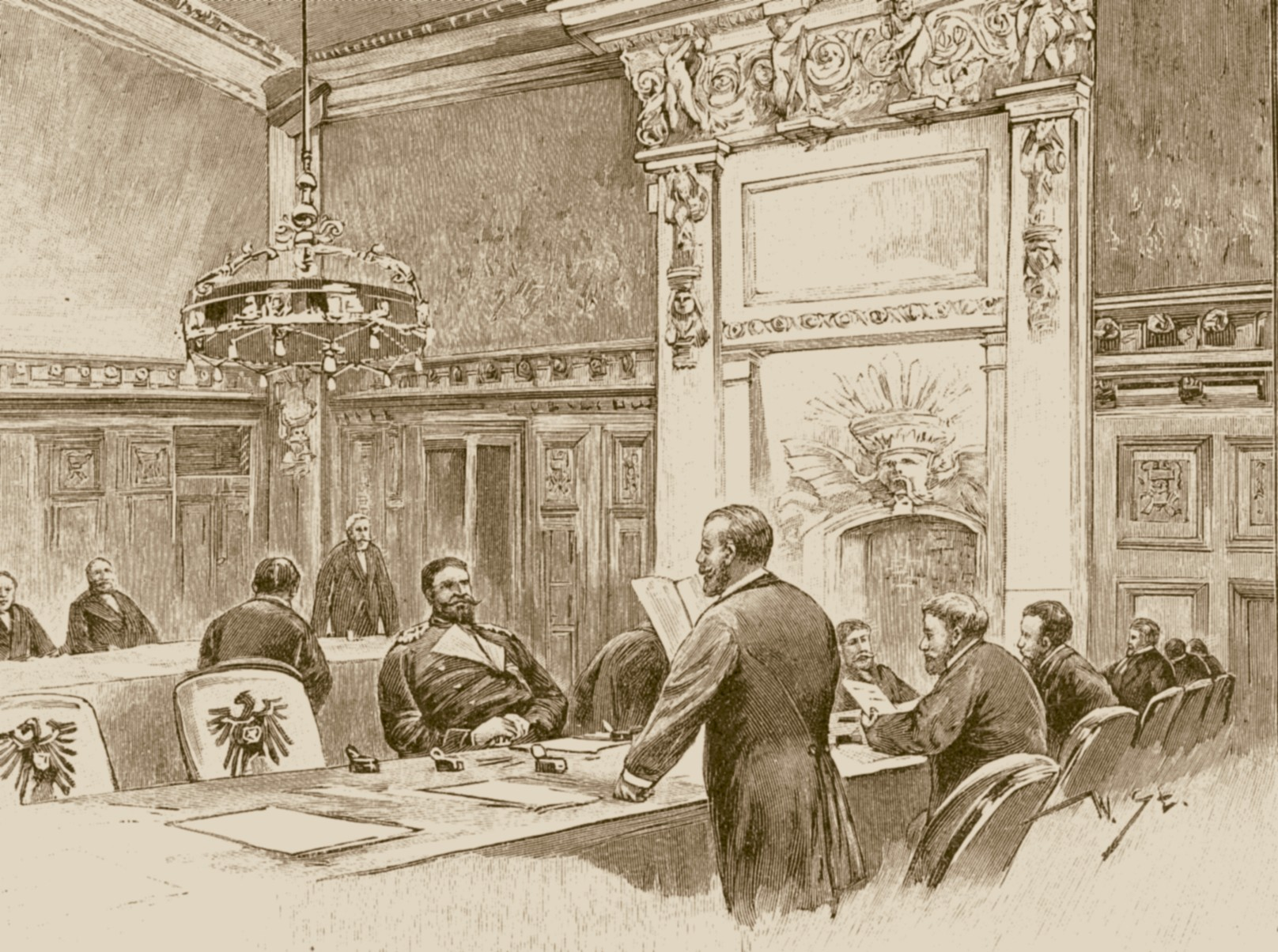
The chamber of the Bundesrat in the Reichstag Palace, around 1894

The Bundesrat, the upper chamber of parliament, initially had 58 members, increasing to 61 in 1911 when Alsace–Lorraine was granted three seats. Members of the Bundesrat were appointed by the state governments to represent their interests in parliament. If the state had more than one vote, they had to be cast uniformly and at the direction of the state government, since it was the state that voted, not an individual authorized representative voting as he wished. In contrast to the popularly elected Reichstag, seats were not apportioned to the states based on population. Prussia, which accounted for roughly two-thirds of Germany's population, had only 17 seats, although its dominant position in the Empire gave it enough authority to assert effective control over the Bundesrat.

The constitution required that both the Bundesrat and the Reichstag approve laws before they came into effect. The Bundesrat was responsible for the enactment of laws, administrative regulations and the judicial resolution of disputes between constituent states. Its approval was required for declarations of war and, with certain limitations, the conclusion of state treaties. Bismarck's original intent had been that the member states would be the bearers of sovereignty and would constitute the Empire's executive through the Bundesrat. That would have put the Bundesrat in the position that the chancellor and ministers (state secretaries) later occupied as the government of the Empire. Bismarck's attempt failed in part because the National Liberals, the largest party in the first Reichstag, wanted to make the chancellor responsible to parliament rather than the emperor. Bismarck changed course and made the chancellor the government in order to block the move towards full parliamentarism.

The Empire's federalism extended to justice, schools, churches, administration, state constitutions, election laws and finance. States were responsible for implementing national laws and did so through their own administrative bodies and regulations, which meant that implementation varied from state to state. The national government did not attempt to standardize state constitutions, although most were relatively similar, providing for a monarch (except in the three free cities) and a two-chamber parliament with an elected lower house and a hereditary upper house. Their voting rights were all more restrictive and unequal than the universal manhood suffrage used in Reichstag elections. Prussia, for example, used a three-class franchise that weighted votes depending on the amount of taxes the voter paid. States also regulated their own income and taxation and had in effect a monopoly on direct taxes. The Empire's main sources of income were tariffs and indirect taxes on such items as salt, tobacco and beer. If the central government needed additional revenue, the states were required to contribute based on population (matricular contributions).

=== Reserve rights ===
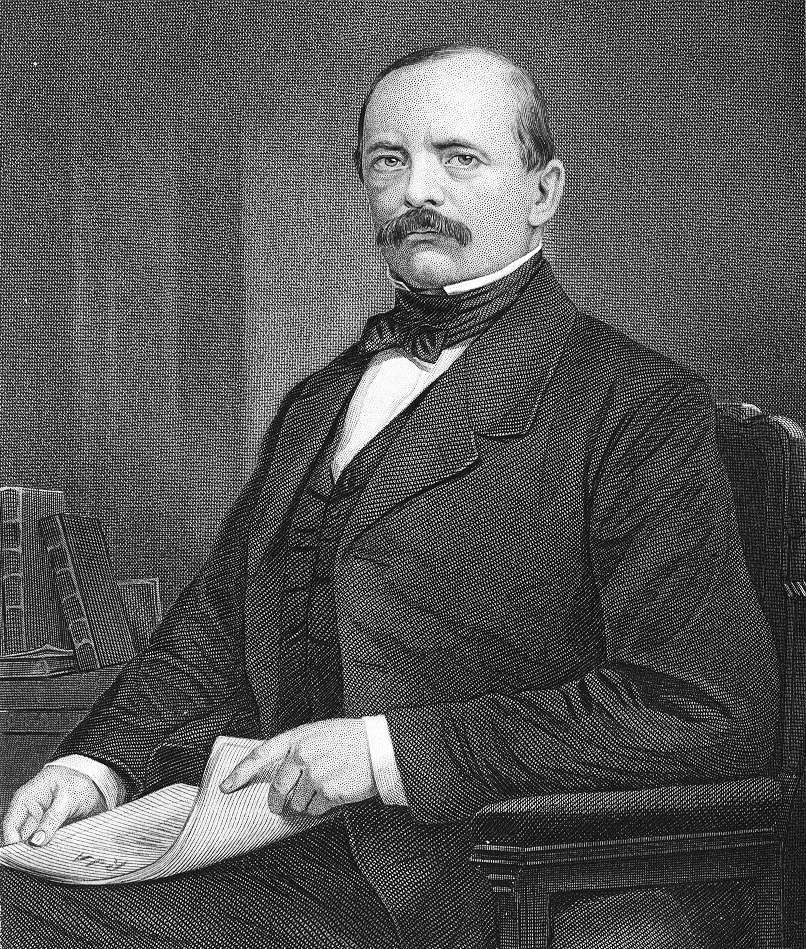
Otto von Bismarck in 1873. His efforts to bring the south German states into the German Empire led to the reserve rights granted to Bavaria and Württemberg.

Reserve rights were restrictions or modifications to the Empire's powers of legislation and legal supervision that applied only to certain states, primarily those south of the Main river that had not been part of the North German Confederation. The special rights were inducements for the states to overcome their reluctance to give up their sovereignty and become part of a new political entity dominated by Prussia. The majority of the reserve rights were spelled out in the November Treaties of 1870 and carried over to the imperial constitution.

One of the key reserve rights affected the armies of the kingdoms of Bavaria, Württemberg and Saxony. The Bavarian Army formed a self-contained part of the Imperial Army with an independent administration under the military authority of the king of Bavaria, although in wartime the army came under the command of the king of Prussia. The Royal Württemberg troops formed the Fourteenth German Imperial Army Corps with its own flags and standards and was commanded by the king of Prussia in both peace and war. In the constitution, the military reserve rights for Bavaria and Württemberg were referred to in the constitution's Final Stipulation to Section XI, which referenced the details in the two November Treaties. The constitution also gave Bavaria and Württemberg permanent seats on the Bundesrat's committee on foreign affairs and the committee on the army and fortifications. Saxony's special rights came from the military convention of 1867 with the North German Confederation. Saxony had limited special rights in the field of military administration in peacetime. The Saxon king was head (but not commander-in-chief) of the Saxon army and had the right to appoint officers below the rank of general.

In Baden, Bavaria and Württemberg, the state was allowed to regulate taxes on beer and spirits. Bavaria and Württemberg had their own postal and telegraph services and the revenues that derived from them. They also maintained their railway systems independently.

== Prussian provinces ==
Because of its size and historical growth through annexations, Prussia was divided into 14 provinces as of the end of the Empire in 1918. Each province had a capital city and parliament. The Kingdom of Prussia itself, with its capital at Berlin, had a two-chamber parliament with the popularly elected Landtag of Prussia as the lower house. Prussia included a Province of Saxony (capital Magdeburg) that was distinct from the Kingdom of Saxony, one of the constituent states of the Empire.

== List of states ==
Flag	State	Capital	Type	Area in km^{2}	Population in 1,000s (1871)	Population in 1,000s (1910)	Percent increase	Reichstag seats	Bundesrat seats
	Alsace–Lorraine	Strassburg	Imperial Territory	14,517	1,550	1,874	20.9	15 (Note: As of 1873)	3 (Note: As of 1911)
	Anhalt	Dessau	Duchy	2,299	203	331	63.1	2	1
	Baden	Karlsruhe	Grand Duchy	15,068	1,462	2,143	46.6	14	3
	Bavaria	Munich	Kingdom	75,870	4,863	6,887	41.6	48	6
	Bremen	Bremen	Free City	256	122	300	145.9	1	1
	Brunswick	Brunswick	Duchy	3,672	312	494	58.3	3	2
	Hamburg	Hamburg	Free City	414	339	1,015	199.4	3	1
	Hesse	Darmstadt	Grand Duchy	7,689	853	1,282	50.3	9	3
	Lippe	Detmold	Principality	1,215	111	151	36.0	1	1
Free City of Lübeck	Lübeck	Lübeck	Free City	298	52	117	125.0	1	1
	Mecklenburg-Schwerin	Schwerin	Grand Duchy	13,127	558	640	14.7	6	2
	Mecklenburg-Strelitz	Neustrelitz	Grand Duchy	2,930	97	106	9.3	1	1
	Oldenburg	Oldenburg	Grand Duchy	6,428	317	483	52.4	3	1
	Prussia (Note: Includes Saxe-Lauenburg)	Berlin	Kingdom	348,702	24,689	40,165	62.7	236	17
	Reuss-Gera (Junior line)	Gera	Principality	827	89	145	62.9	1	1
	Reuss-Greiz (Senior Line)	Greiz	Principality	316	45	73	62.2	1	1
	Saxe-Altenburg	Altenburg	Duchy	1,324	142	224	57.7	1	1
	Saxe-Coburg and Gotha	Coburg, Gotha	Duchy	1,977	174	257	47.7	2	1
	Saxe-Meiningen	Meiningen	Duchy	2,468	188	279	48.4	2	1
	Saxe-Weimar-Eisenach (Note: Officially the Grand Duchy of Saxony from 1903)	Weimar	Grand Duchy	3,611	286	417	45.8	3	1
	Saxony	Dresden	Kingdom	14,993	2,556	4,807	88.1	23	4
	Schaumburg-Lippe	Bückeburg	Principality	340	32	46	43.8	1	1
	Schwarzburg-Rudolstadt	Rudolstadt	Principality	940	76	101	32.9	1	1
Schwarzburg Sondershausen	Schwarzburg-Sondershausen	Sondershausen	Principality	862	67	90	34.3	1	1
Germany	Waldeck and Pyrmont	Arolsen	Principality	1,121	56	62	10.7	1	1
Kingdom of Württemberg	Württemberg	Stuttgart	Kingdom	19,512	1,819	2,438	34.0	17	4
Total				540,776	41,058	64,927	58.1	397	61

== Flags and cockades ==
Cockades of the German states

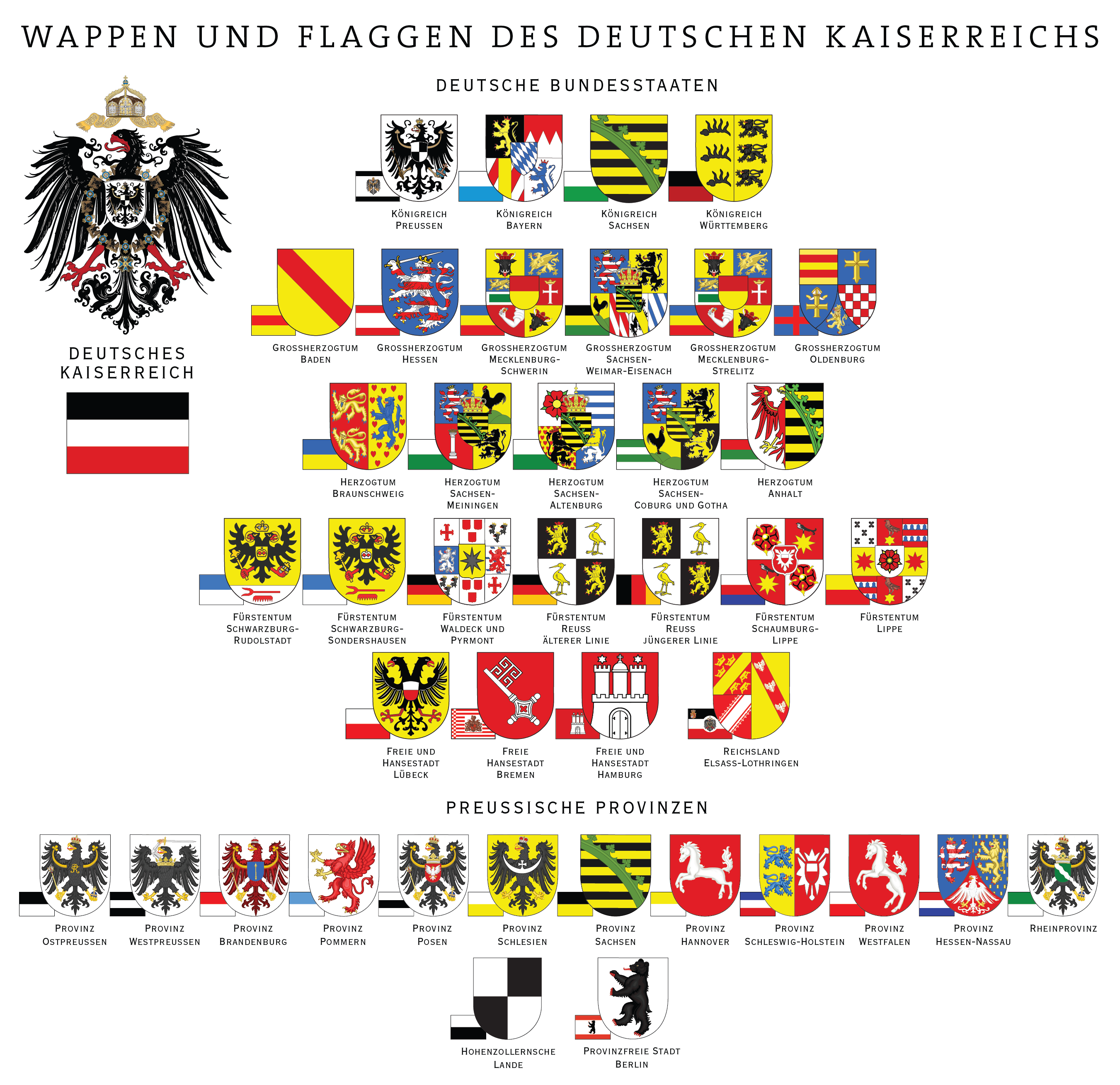
The flags and coat of arms of all states, the Imperial Territory of Alsace-Lorraine, and the Prussian provinces

== See also ==
- Provinces of Prussia
- States of the German Confederation
- List of German monarchs in 1918
- States of the Weimar Republic
- Administrative divisions of Nazi Germany
- Administrative divisions of East Germany
- States of Germany
