= Das große Lexikon des Dritten Reiches =

1985 two-volume encyclopedia of Nazi Germany

- Title page of the English first edition
- Author: Christian Zentner; Friedemann Bedürftig
- Original title: Das große Lexikon des Dritten Reiches
- Publication date: 1985
- ISBN: 978-3-517-00834-9

Das große Lexikon des Dritten Reiches (The Encyclopedia of the Third Reich) is a two-volume text edited by Christian Zentner and Friedemann Bedürftig, first published in German in 1985.

It is a leading source for information about Nazi Germany and the reign of Adolf Hitler and the Nazi Party between 1933 and 1945. The text covers nearly every major figure, organization, and event during the Nazi era. It does not, however, address the military history of World War II, only the role in which Nazi Germany participated through policies and national directives. The two-volume hardback edition and subsequent one-volume paperback edition include more than 3,000 specific subject entries and over 1,200 "well-chosen illustrations".

The work is considered to be a critical text and may be found at most major US and British universities. The Library Journal review stated it to be "the definitive reference source for basic data on events in National Socialist Germany. Contributors include some of the former Federal Republic's (West Germany) best young historians".
