= List of historic states of Germany =

Germany is traditionally a country organized as a federal state. The dissolution of the Holy Roman Empire in 1806 and the Napoleonic Wars led to an interregnum of federalized control. But after the Congress of Vienna in 1815, the German-speaking territories of the former Holy Roman Empire became allied in the German Confederation (1815–1866), a league of states with a shared army and some federal elements to regulate issues that affected multiple states. After the Austro-Prussian War, the Northern states joined into a federal state called the North German Confederation (1867–1870), led by Prussia. The Southern states joined the federal state in 1870/71, which was consequently renamed the German Empire (1871–1918). The state continued as the Weimar Republic (1919–1933).

Present-day Germany is a federal republic which combines the States of Germany.

== States of the German Confederation ==
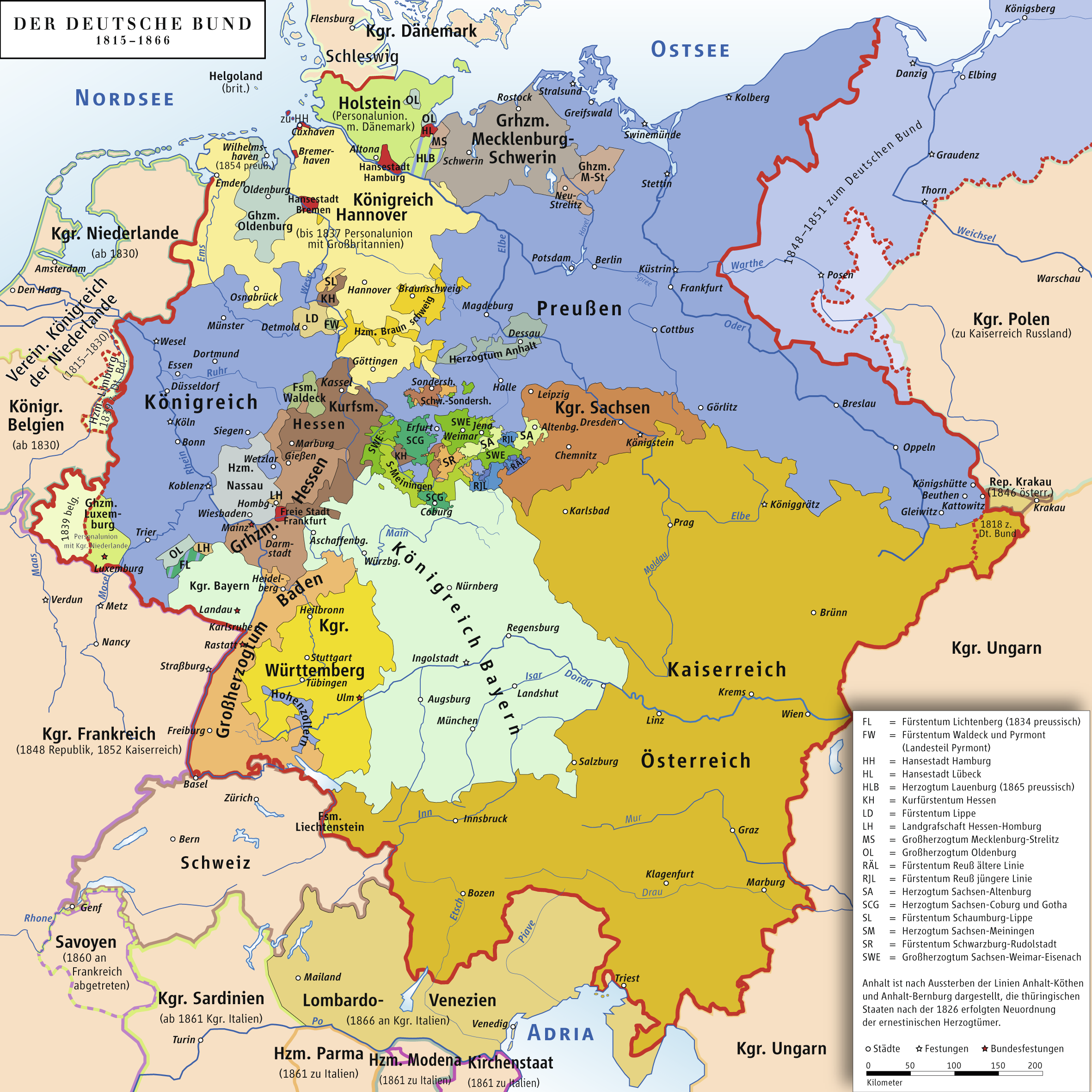
A map of the German Confederation

State	Capital
Empires (Kaisertümer)
Austria (Österreich) (only western Cisleithania)	Vienna
Kingdoms (Königreiche)
Bavaria (Bayern)	Munich
Hanover (Hannover)	Hanover
Prussia (Preußen) (excluding Posen, East Prussia and West Prussia)	Berlin
Saxony (Sachsen)	Dresden
Württemberg	Stuttgart
Electorates (Kurfürstentum)
Hesse-Kassel (Hessen-Kassel)	Kassel
Grand Duchies (Großherzogtümer)
Baden	Karlsruhe
Hesse-Darmstadt (Hessen-Darmstadt)	Darmstadt
Luxembourg (Luxemburg)	Luxembourg
Mecklenburg-Schwerin	Schwerin
Mecklenburg-Strelitz	Neustrelitz
Oldenburg	Oldenburg
Saxe-Weimar-Eisenach (Sachsen-Weimar-Eisenach)	Weimar
Duchies (Herzogtümer)
Anhalt – from 1863	Dessau
Brunswick (Braunschweig)	Braunschweig
Holstein	Glückstadt
Limburg – from 1839	N/A
Nassau	Wiesbaden
Saxe-Altenburg (Sachsen-Altenburg) – from 1826	Altenburg
Saxe-Coburg and Gotha (Sachsen-Coburg und Gotha) – from 1826	Coburg and Gotha
Saxe-Lauenburg	Ratzeburg
Saxe-Meiningen (Sachsen-Meiningen)	Meiningen
Principalities (Fürstentümer)
Hohenzollern-Hechingen – to Prussia in 1850	Hechingen
Hohenzollern-Sigmaringen – to Prussia in 1850	Sigmaringen
Liechtenstein	Vaduz
Lippe	Detmold
Reuss-Gera (Junior Line)	Gera
Reuss-Greiz (Elder Line)	Greiz
Schaumburg-Lippe	Bückeburg
Schwarzburg-Rudolstadt	Rudolstadt
Schwarzburg-Sondershausen	Sondershausen
Waldeck and Pyrmont (Waldeck und Pyrmont)	Arolsen
Landgraviates (Landgrafschaft)
Hesse-Homburg (Hessen-Homburg) – from 1817	Bad Homburg
Free Cities (Freie Städte)
Bremen
Frankfurt
Hamburg
Lübeck
States merged to form Anhalt
Anhalt-Dessau – merged with Anhalt-Bernburg in 1863	Dessau
Anhalt-Bernburg – merged with Anhalt-Dessau in 1863	Bernburg
Anhalt-Köthen – merged with Anhalt-Dessau in 1853	Köthen
States split between Saxe-Coburg-Gotha, Saxe-Meiningen, and Saxe-Altenburg in 1826
Saxe-Gotha-Altenburg (Sachsen-Gotha-Altenburg)	Gotha
Saxe-Coburg-Saalfeld (Sachsen-Coburg-Saalfeld)	Coburg
Saxe-Hildburghausen (Sachsen-Hildburghausen)	Hildburghausen

In 1864, Austria and Prussia together became the new sovereign of Holstein (a member of the confederation) and Schleswig (outside the confederation). After the Austro-Prussian War, Austria was forced to relinquish Schleswig and Holstein to Prussian control.

== States of the North German Confederation ==
A map of the North German Confederation

State	Capital
Kingdoms (Königreiche)
Prussia (Preußen) as a whole (including Lauenburg)	Berlin
Saxony (Sachsen)	Dresden
Grand Duchies (Großherzogtümer)
Hesse (Hessen) (Only Upper Hesse, the province north of the river Main)	Giessen
Mecklenburg-Schwerin	Schwerin
Mecklenburg-Strelitz	Neustrelitz
Oldenburg	Oldenburg
Saxe-Weimar-Eisenach (Sachsen-Weimar-Eisenach)	Weimar
Duchies (Herzogtümer)
Anhalt	Dessau
Brunswick (Braunschweig)	Braunschweig
Saxe-Altenburg (Sachsen-Altenburg)	Altenburg
Saxe-Coburg and Gotha (Sachsen-Coburg und Gotha)	Coburg
Saxe-Meiningen (Sachsen-Meiningen)	Meiningen
Principalities (Fürstentümer)
Lippe	Detmold
Reuss-Gera (Junior Line)	Gera
Reuss-Greiz (Elder Line)	Greiz
Schaumburg-Lippe	Bückeburg
Schwarzburg-Rudolstadt	Rudolstadt
Schwarzburg-Sondershausen	Sondershausen
Waldeck and Pyrmont (Waldeck und Pyrmont)	Arolsen
Free and Hanseatic Cities (Freie und Hansestädte)
Bremen
Hamburg
Lübeck

== States of the German Empire ==
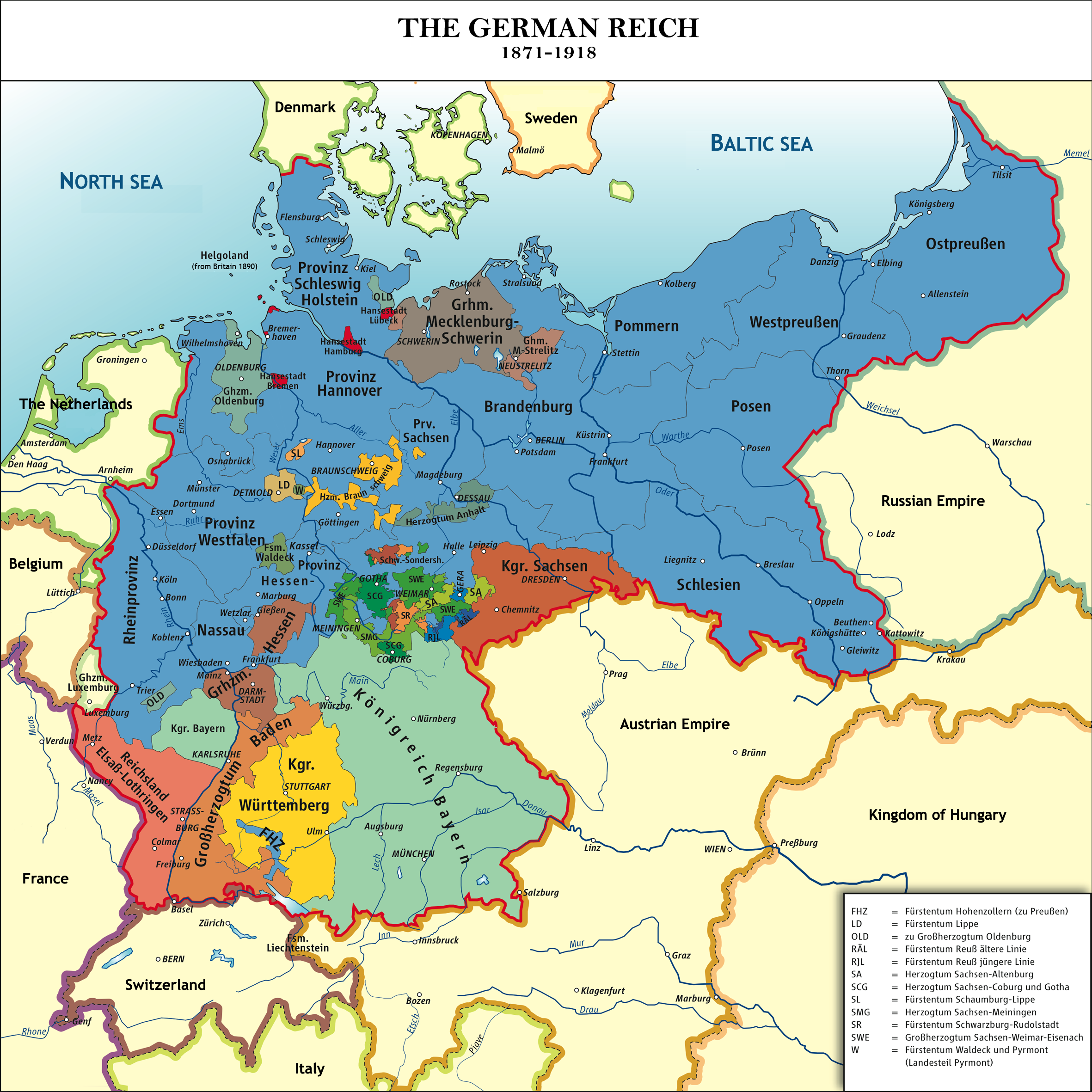
A map of the German Empire

State	Capital
Kingdoms (Königreiche)
Prussia (Preußen) as a whole	Berlin
Bavaria (Bayern)	Munich
Saxony (Sachsen)	Dresden
Württemberg	Stuttgart
Grand Duchies (Großherzogtümer)
Baden	Karlsruhe
Hesse (Hessen)	Darmstadt
Mecklenburg-Schwerin	Schwerin
Mecklenburg-Strelitz	Neustrelitz
Oldenburg	Oldenburg
Saxe-Weimar-Eisenach (Sachsen-Weimar-Eisenach)	Weimar
Duchies (Herzogtümer)
Anhalt	Dessau
Brunswick (Braunschweig)	Braunschweig
Saxe-Altenburg (Sachsen-Altenburg)	Altenburg
Saxe-Coburg and Gotha (Sachsen-Coburg und Gotha)	Coburg
Saxe-Meiningen (Sachsen-Meiningen)	Meiningen
Principalities (Fürstentümer)
Lippe	Detmold
Reuss-Gera (Junior Line)	Gera
Reuss-Greiz (Elder Line)	Greiz
Schaumburg-Lippe	Bückeburg
Schwarzburg-Rudolstadt	Rudolstadt
Schwarzburg-Sondershausen	Sondershausen
Waldeck and Pyrmont (Waldeck und Pyrmont)	Arolsen
Free and Hanseatic Cities (Freie und Hansestädte)
Bremen
Hamburg
Lübeck
Imperial Territories (Reichsländer)
Alsace–Lorraine (Elsass-Lothringen)	Straßburg

== States of the Weimar Republic ==
A map of the Weimar Republic

State	Capital
Free States (Freistaaten)
Anhalt	Dessau
Baden	Karlsruhe
Bavaria (Bayern)	Munich
Brunswick (Braunschweig)	Braunschweig
Coburg – to Bavaria in 1920	Coburg
Hesse (Hessen)	Darmstadt
Lippe	Detmold
Mecklenburg-Schwerin	Schwerin
Mecklenburg-Strelitz	Neustrelitz
Oldenburg	Oldenburg
Prussia (Preußen)	Berlin
Saxony (Sachsen)	Dresden
Schaumburg-Lippe	Bückeburg
Thuringia (Thüringen) – from 1920	Weimar
Waldeck-Pyrmont – to Prussia (Pyrmont joined Prussia in 1921, Waldeck followed in 1929)	Arolsen
Württemberg	Stuttgart
Free and Hanseatic Cities (Freie und Hansestädte)
Bremen
Hamburg
Lübeck
States merged to form Thuringia in 1920
Reuss	Gera
Saxe-Altenburg (Sachsen-Altenburg)	Altenburg
Saxe-Gotha (Sachsen-Gotha)	Gotha
Saxe-Meiningen (Sachsen-Meiningen)	Meiningen
Saxe-Weimar-Eisenach (Sachsen-Weimar-Eisenach)	Weimar
Schwarzburg-Rudolstadt	Rudolstadt
Schwarzburg-Sondershausen	Sondershausen

=== States of Special Status ===
- Territory of the Saar Basin
- Klaipėda Region
- Free City of Danzig

== See also ==
- List of former sovereign states
- List of states in the Holy Roman Empire (962–1806)
- States of Germany, about the modern states
