= Coat of arms of Thuringia =

Coat of arms of the German state of Thuringia

- Armiger: Free State of Thuringia
- Adopted: 1990
- Shield: Azure, a lion rampant barry of eight Gules and Argent, crowned and armed Or, surrounded by eight mullets Argent

The coat of arms of the German state of Thuringia was introduced in 1990. Like the 1949 coat of arms of Hesse it is based on the Ludovingian lion barry, also known as the "lion of Hesse", with the addition of eight mullets.

== Description ==
The coat of arms can be blazoned Azure, a lion rampant barry of eight Gules and Argent, crowned and armed Or, surrounded by eight mullets Argent. This can be interpreted as a blue field with a lion of eight horizontal red-and-white-stripes, with a gold crown and claws, with eight white/silver stars. Some people believe the stars represent eight historical divisions of the state.

== Legal position ==
It was included in the Gesetz über die Hoheitszeichen (Law on the Regional Emblems) of 30 January 1991, which came into law retrospectively to 3 October 1990. The current law, Verordnung zur Ausführung des Gesetzes über die Hoheitszeichen des Landes prescribed its use, including banning use by third parties, use of the coat of arms on the seal and use of the arms on the State flag.

== History ==
=== Coat of arms of the State of Thuringia (1920–1933) ===
The state of Thuringia was created in 1920 by uniting the seven Thuringian polities: Saxe-Weimar-Eisenach, Saxe-Meiningen, half of Saxe-Coburg and Gotha (where Saxe (Gotha) subsequently merged into Thuringia whereas Coburg merged into Bavaria), Saxe-Altenburg, Republic of Reuss (Reuss Elder Line, Reuss Younger Line), Schwarzburg-Sondershausen and Schwarzburg-Rudolstadt. The northern part of today's Thuringia was part of Prussia (Erfurt governorate) and therefore not represented in this coat of arms. Inspired by the American flag (by featuring one star for each of its counties), the shield is gules, seven mullets of six points argent - seven six-pointed stars on a red background. It was used on the state flag of that period. The coat of arms was used until 1933, when the NSDAP government created a new coat of arms.

=== Coat of arms of the Landgraviate of Thuringia ===
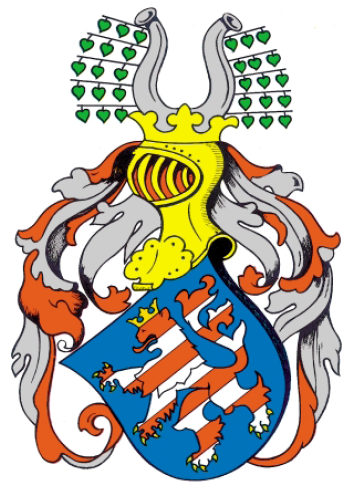
The arms of the landgraves of Thuringia

In 1040 the Ludovingians, a dynasty from Upper Franconia (then Upper East Franconia), gained various possessions in northern territories of modern Thuringia, which at that time were part of the Duchy of Saxony. Later generations of Ludovingians acquired control over additional possessions in Thuringia proper and parts of West Franconia around Hessengau (today northern Hesse). They also became the counts palatine of Saxony. In 1137, Ludovingians became Thuringian landgraves, a position comparable to that of a duke and which was an imperial immediacy (i.e. they were subject only to the emperor and not to any intermediate feudal lord). In 1247, the Ludowinger line died out with Henry Raspe, and their lands and titles were succeeded by the House of Wettin. In 1264, following the War of the Thuringian Succession, the eastern parts of the Thuringian landgraviate remained under Wettin rule, together with the neighboring Margraviate of Meissen and the Palatinate of Saxony, while the most western Thuringian regions were separated and later became the Landgraviate of Hesse.

Coat of arms of the Palatinate of Thuringia

Together with the Thuringian landgravian title, the Wettin princes continued to use the traditional Thuringian coat of arms. The Hessian landgraves also retained the Thuringian lion barry, and its use continued through the various Hessian states to this day, where it can be found in the coat of arms of the modern state Hesse, albeit in a slightly different form than modern Thuringia's.)

The arms, used by Landgrave Conrad in the 13th century, were azure, a crowned lion rampant barry of eight gules and argent, crowned and armed or.

=== Coat of arms of the Palatinate of Thuringia ===
During the 15th century, while holding the Landgraviate of Thuringia, the House of Wettin also claimed the Palatinate of Thuringia (German: Pfalzgrafschaft Thüringen). That was a newly coined designation, created in order to strengthen dynastic claims over various possessions in border regions between Thuringia and the Palatinate of Saxony. By the reign of Ernest I (in Thuringia: 1482-1486), symbols of the Thuringian palatinate (a golden eagle on the black shield) were included into the Wettin dynastic coats of arms, and the same heraldic representation was later used in various derivations (ducal and royal coats of arms).

== Gallery ==
Schwarzburg-Sondershausen 1599–1918

Schwarzburg-Rudolstadt 1599–1918

Duchy of Saxe-Altenburg 1602–1672 and 1826–1918

Duchy of Saxe-Meiningen 1680–1918

Duchy of Saxe-Gotha-Altenburg 1672–1826

Duchy of Saxe-Hildburghausen 1680–1826

Principality of Reuss-Greiz 1778–1918

Principality of Reuss-Gera 1806–1918

Saxe-Weimar-Eisenach 1809–1918

Saxe-Coburg and Gotha 1826–1918

People's State of Reuss 1919–1920

State of Thuringia 1921–1933

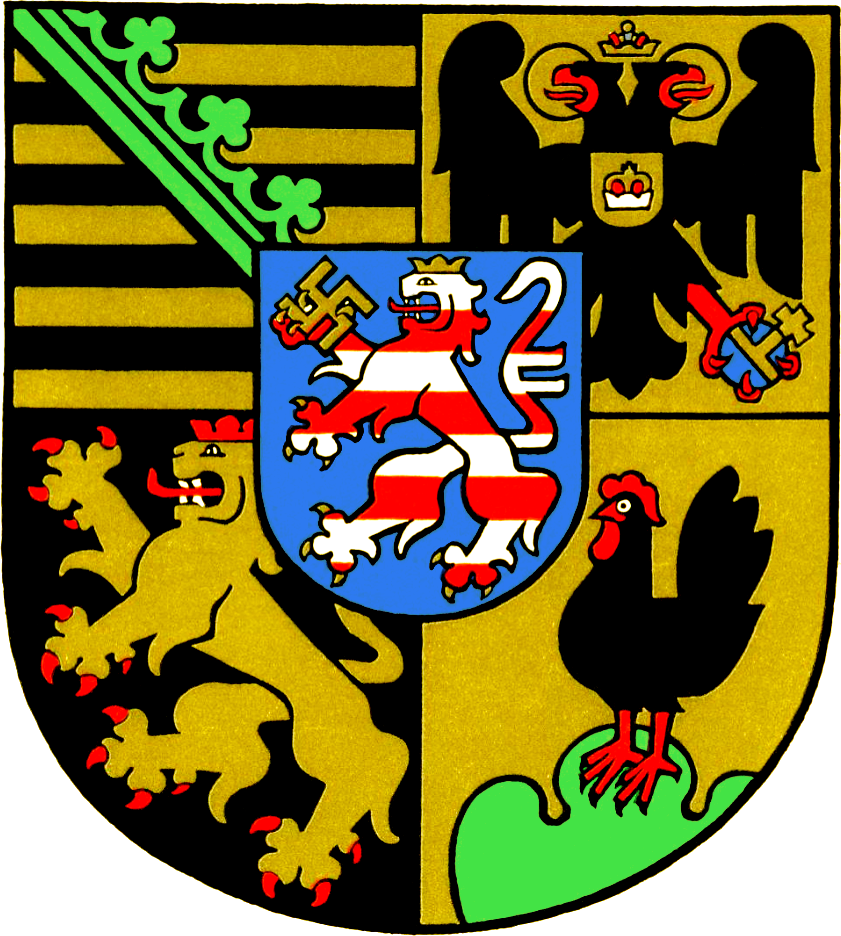
State of Thuringia 1933–1945

Coat of arms of Thuringia 1945–1952

== See also ==
- Origin of the coats of arms of German federal states
- Coat of arms of Saxony
- Coat of arms of Hesse
- Coat of arms of Germany

== Sources ==
- Heinze, Erich (1925). "Die Entwicklung der Pfalzgrafschaft Sachsen bis ins 14. Jahrhundert". Sachsen und Anhalt: Jahrbuch der Historischen Kommission für die Provinz Sachsen und für Anhalt. 1: 20–63.
- Wilson, Peter (2016). Heart of Europe: A History of the Holy Roman Empire. Cambridge: Harvard University Press.
