= Free State of Saxe-Meiningen =

German state (1918–1920)

Coordinates: 50°33′N 10°25′E

Free State of Saxe-Meiningen Freistaat Sachsen-Meiningen
- 1918–1920
- Flag

- Saxe-Meiningen within the German Empire

- Saxe-Meiningen (in yellow) within Thuringia
- Capital: Meiningen
- Government: Republic
- Historical era: Interwar period
  - German revolution of 1918–1919: 1918
  - Merged into Thuringia: 1920

Area
  - Total: 2,468 km^{2} (953 sq mi)

Population
  - 1919 census: 274,579
Preceded by	Succeeded by
Duchy of Saxe-Meiningen	Thuringia

The Free State of Saxe-Meiningen (German: Freistaat Sachsen-Meiningen) was a small, short-lived (1918–1920) central German state during the early years of the Weimar Republic. It was formed following the dissolution of the Duchy of Saxe-Meiningen during the German revolution of 1918–1919. After Duke Bernhard III abdicated, Saxe-Meiningen transitioned peacefully into a republic. It became part of Thuringia when it was created on 1 May 1920.

== History ==
The Free State's predecessor, the Duchy of Saxe-Meiningen (1680–1918), was part of the Ernestine line of the House of Wettin. It became a member state of the North German Confederation in 1866 and of the German Empire in 1871. The Duchy was a hereditary monarchy with a single-chamber Landtag (state parliament) and was ruled from 1914 to 1918 by Duke Bernhard III. It had two seats in the Empire's Reichstag and one in the Bundesrat.

The Duchy collapsed during the revolution of 1918–1919, which brought down the German Empire and all of Germany's royal houses at the end of World War I. The revolution began in late October 1918 when rebellious sailors at Kiel set up a workers' and soldiers' council and in early November spread the revolt across the rest of Germany. Emperor Wilhelm II fled to Holland on 10 November, and councils quickly took power from the existing military, royal and civil authorities with little resistance or bloodshed.

A workers' and soldiers' council was set up at Meiningen in early November. Under pressure from the council and from the rapidly changing political situation in Germany, Duke Bernhard III abdicated on 10 November. His half-brother and heir to the throne, Ernst Bernhard Viktor, renounced his claim two days later. Also on 12 November, Saxe-Meiningen's Landtag, which had been in place since the last election in 1909, appointed a new state ministry to be Saxe-Meiningen's interim government. It was headed by privy councillor Ludwig von Türcke, a political independent, and had two additional independents as state councillors. Three members of the moderate Social Democratic Party (SPD) and one from the liberal German Democratic Party (DDP) were elected from the ranks of Landtag deputies as honorary state councillors.

On 30 December 1918, the Landtag and Bernhard III concluded an agreement on the disposition of his property. It included an expropriation settlement of 11 million marks, from which the Duke was granted a monthly pension at 4.5% interest in lieu of a lump sum payment.

The Landtag passed a democratic constitution for Saxe-Meiningen on 15 November 1918 (the “Law on Legislation and Administration in Saxe-Meiningen”). On 9 March 1919, an election was held for a new Landtag to replace the 1909 body. The SPD won an absolute majority of the votes (52% and 13 of 24 seats). In spite of the results, the previous government under von Türcke was confirmed in office without any personnel changes. The two formerly unaffiliated state councillors did however join the DDP, which had finished second in the election with 18% of the vote.

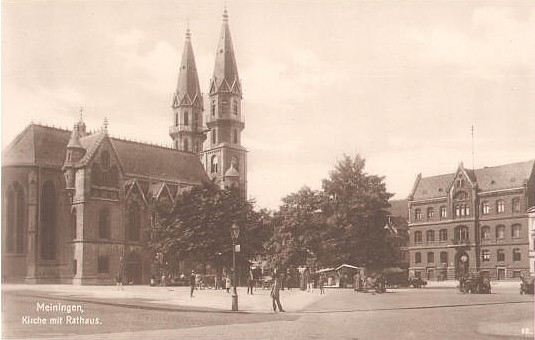
The city of Meiningen around 1900

The Free State of Saxe-Meiningen took a wait-and-see approach to merging with the other Thuringian states. The governing coalition wanted to join a "greater" Thuringia that would include the Thuringian regions that were part of Prussia, while the Thuringian Agricultural League preferred annexation to Prussia. Due to Meiningen's traditionally strong ties to Franconia, there were also efforts in some parts of the state to join Bavaria. After Prussia refused to cede any of its territory to a new state of Thuringia, a clear majority in the Landtag voted on 12 December 1919 to approve the Thuringian Community Treaty, an agreement among the Thuringian states (except Coburg, which merged into Bavaria) to form a unified state without the Prussian regions. The government of Meiningen insisted on a number of reservations and special requests, which were accepted by the Thuringian State Council. In particular, Meiningen did not want the debts of the other states to become the joint debts of the new state and called for all parts of Saxe-Meiningen to remain together.

With the founding of the state of Thuringia on 1 May 1920, the Free State of Saxe-Meiningen formally ceased to exist as a federal state. In the autumn, some of its former territory launched an ultimately unsuccessful campaign to break away from Thuringia. The "Law on the Administration of the Former Thuringian states during the Transition Period’" of 9 December 1920 transformed the Free State into a higher-level municipal association, the Saxe-Meiningen region, with regional representation and a regional government; it was abolished on 1 April 1923. The state parliament became the regional representation without new elections.
