= Free State of Schwarzburg-Sondershausen =

German state (1918–1920)

Coordinates: 51°22′N 10°52′E

Free State of Schwarzburg-Sondershausen Freistaat Schwarzburg-Sondershausen
- 1918–1920
- Flag

- Schwarzburg-Sondershausen within the German Empire

- Schwarzburg-Sondershausen (3 regions, in dark gray) within the Thuringian states
- Capital: Sondershausen
- Government: Republic
- Historical era: Interwar era
  - German revolution of 1918–1919: 1918
  - Merged into Thuringia: 1920

Area
- 1919: 862 km^{2} (333 sq mi)

Population
  - 1919: 92,692
Preceded by	Succeeded by
Principality of Schwarzburg-Sondershausen	Thuringia
- Today part of: Germany

The Free State of Schwarzburg-Sondershausen (German: Freistaat Schwarzburg-Sondershausen) was a small, short-lived (1918–1920) central German state in the early years of the Weimar Republic. It was formed following the dissolution of the Principality of Schwarzburg-Sondershausen during the German revolution of 1918–1919. After Prince Günther Victor abdicated, Schwarzburg-Sondershausen transitioned peacefully into a republic. It became part of Thuringia when it was created on 1 May 1920.

== History ==
The Free State's predecessor, the Principality of Schwarzburg-Sondershausen (1599–1918), became part of the North German Confederation in 1866 and of the German Empire in 1871. It was a hereditary monarchy with a single-chamber Landtag (state parliament). From 1909 to1918, Prince Günther Victor ruled Schwarzburg-Sondershausen and Schwarzburg-Rudolstadt in personal union. It had one seat each in the Empire's Reichstag and Bundesrat.

=== German revolution ===
The Principality of Schwarzburg-Sondershausen collapsed during the revolution of 1918–1919 which brought down the German Empire and all of Germany's royal houses at the end of World War I. The revolution began in late October 1918 when rebellious sailors at Kiel set up a workers' and soldiers' council and in early November spread the revolt across the rest of Germany. Emperor Wilhelm II fled to Holland on 10 November, and councils quickly took power from the existing military, royal and civil authorities with little resistance or bloodshed.

On 11 November a workers' council formed in Sondershausen, but it had little effect on the course of events in the Principality. Instead, a state council (Landesrat) made up of representatives of the radical left Independent Social Democratic Party (USPD) and members of Schwarzburg-Sondershausen's standing Landtag committee took control of the Principality. Prince Günther Victor, under pressure from the Rudolstadt workers' and soldiers' council, agreed to abdicate on 15 November.

=== The Free State ===
The Landtag in Sondershausen passed a law on 25 November amending the Principality's 1857 constitution to create the republican Free State of Schwarzburg-Sondershausen. Günther Victor abdicated for Schwarzburg-Sondershausen the same day. Unlike in many of the former Empire's other constituent states, the transition from principality to republic in Sondershausen took place peacefully and within the former principality's constitutional bounds.

The election for the Free State's new Landtag was held on 26 January 1919. A combined list of the USPD and the moderate Social Democratic Party (SPD) won 63% of the vote. The overwhelming majority of the voters for the list can be inferred to have been USPD supporters, given that in the election a week previously for the Weimar National Assembly (the body that served as Germany's interim parliament and drafted the Weimar Constitution), 55% of the Free State's vote went to the USPD and only 6% to the SPD.

Following the Landtag election, a government ministry for Schwarzburg-Sondershausen formed under lead minister Wilhelm Bärwinkel of the USPD. The new Landtag passed an updated basic law (constitution) for the Free State on 1 April 1919.

=== Merger into Thuringia ===
In late March 1919, representatives of the eight Thuringian states had met in Weimar to begin discussing plans to form a unified state. All except Coburg, which chose to become part of Bavaria, signed the “Community Agreement on the Merger of the Thuringian States” on 4 January 1920. Both houses of the Weimar Republic's parliament subsequently passed a federal law officially creating the State of Thuringia with its capital at Weimar.

With the founding of the state of Thuringia on 1 May 1920, the Free State of Schwarzburg-Sondershausen formally ceased to exist as a federal state. The "Law on the Administration of the Former Thuringian States During the Transition Period" of 9 December 1920 handled the long process of reshaping the internal configuration of Thuringia's local and regional government bodies.
