= Free State of Saxe-Altenburg =

German state (1918–1920)

Coordinates: 50°59′6″N 12°26′0″E

Free State of Saxe-Altenburg Freistaat Sachsen-Altenburg
- 1918–1920
- Flag

- Saxe-Altenburg within the German Empire

- Saxe-Altenburg (two regions, in orange) within the Thuringian states
- Capital: Altenburg
- Government: Republic
- Historical era: Interwar era
  - German revolution of 1918–1919: 1918
  - Merged into Thuringia: 1920

Area
- 1919: 1,323 km^{2} (511 sq mi)

Population
  - 1919: 209,904
Preceded by	Succeeded by
Saxe-Altenburg	Thuringia
- Today part of: Germany

The Free State of Saxe-Altenburg (German: Freistaat Sachsen-Altenburg) was a small, short-lived (1918–1920) central German state during the early years of the Weimar Republic. It was formed following the dissolution of the Duchy of Saxe-Altenburg during the German revolution of 1918–1919. After Duke Ernst II abdicated, Saxe-Altenburg transitioned peacefully into a republic. It became part of Thuringia when the state was created on 1 May 1920.

== History ==
The Duchy of Saxe-Altenburg, one of the Saxon duchies held by the Ernestine branch of the House of Wettin, was a member state of the Prussian-dominated North German Confederation (1866–1871) and of the German Empire (1871–1918). It was a hereditary monarchy with a single-chamber Landtag (state parliament) and was ruled from 1908 to 1918 by Duke Ernst II. It had two seats in the Empire's Reichstag and one in the Bundesrat.

The Duchy collapsed during the revolution of 1918–1919 which brought down the German Empire and all of Germany's royal houses at the end of World War I. The revolution began in late October 1918 when rebellious sailors at Kiel set up a workers' and soldiers' council and in early November spread the revolt across the rest of Germany. Emperor Wilhelm II fled to Holland on 10 November, and councils quickly took power from the existing military, royal and civil authorities with little resistance or bloodshed.

A soldiers' council was established in Altenburg on 8 November and joined forces the following day with a workers' group led by August Fröhlich of the moderate Social Democratic Party (SPD). The combined workers' and soldiers' council declared itself in control of the Duchy, and out of concern that the revolutionary movement might come into discredit if violence broke out, called on the Duchy's civil and military authorities to maintain quiet on the streets. There was to be no plundering, and the Duke and his family were not to be touched.

Local workers' and soldiers' councils formed in many towns across the Duchy, but overall control remained in Altenburg. On 10 November, the council had a flier distributed throughout the Duchy outlining the status of the revolution and stating its expectations for Saxe-Altenburg's residents:

As of today, a new order has come into effect in the Duchy of Saxe-Altenburg. The Workers' and Soldiers' Council has taken power and has the support of the people. The upheaval was necessary at this moment in time in order to steer developments in the right direction with a minimum of disruption and using the people's right to self-determination. We therefore appeal to the entire population to calmly submit to the new order. We have taken over military power.... The civil authorities will not be able to evade our demands. The task of the population is to calmly submit to the new order. The Workers' and Soldiers' Council will ensure strict order. Any disturbances will be ruthlessly suppressed. The safety of persons and property is guaranteed. The soldiers in the barracks will govern themselves through soldiers' councils and maintain discipline. Officers who submit to the demands of the changed times will remain in their posts. ... All civil servants will remain in their positions if they submit to the Workers' and Soldiers' Council. The exercise of state power in the Duchy will be controlled by the workers until further measures are decided by the national government. ... Equal and universal suffrage in elections to the state parliament is already secured, and the democratization of local elections is also guaranteed by the new developments.

Duke Ernst II immediately entered into negotiations with the workers' and soldiers' council, the political parties in the Landtag and the trade unions. No agreement was reached on the disposition of his property, but on 13 November he appointed a new ministry as his last official act and then abdicated. The new liberal ministry was made up of former ducal officials and Social Democrats, with Wilhelm Tell of the National Liberal Party as lead minister and August Frölich (SPD) as state councillor (Staatsrat).

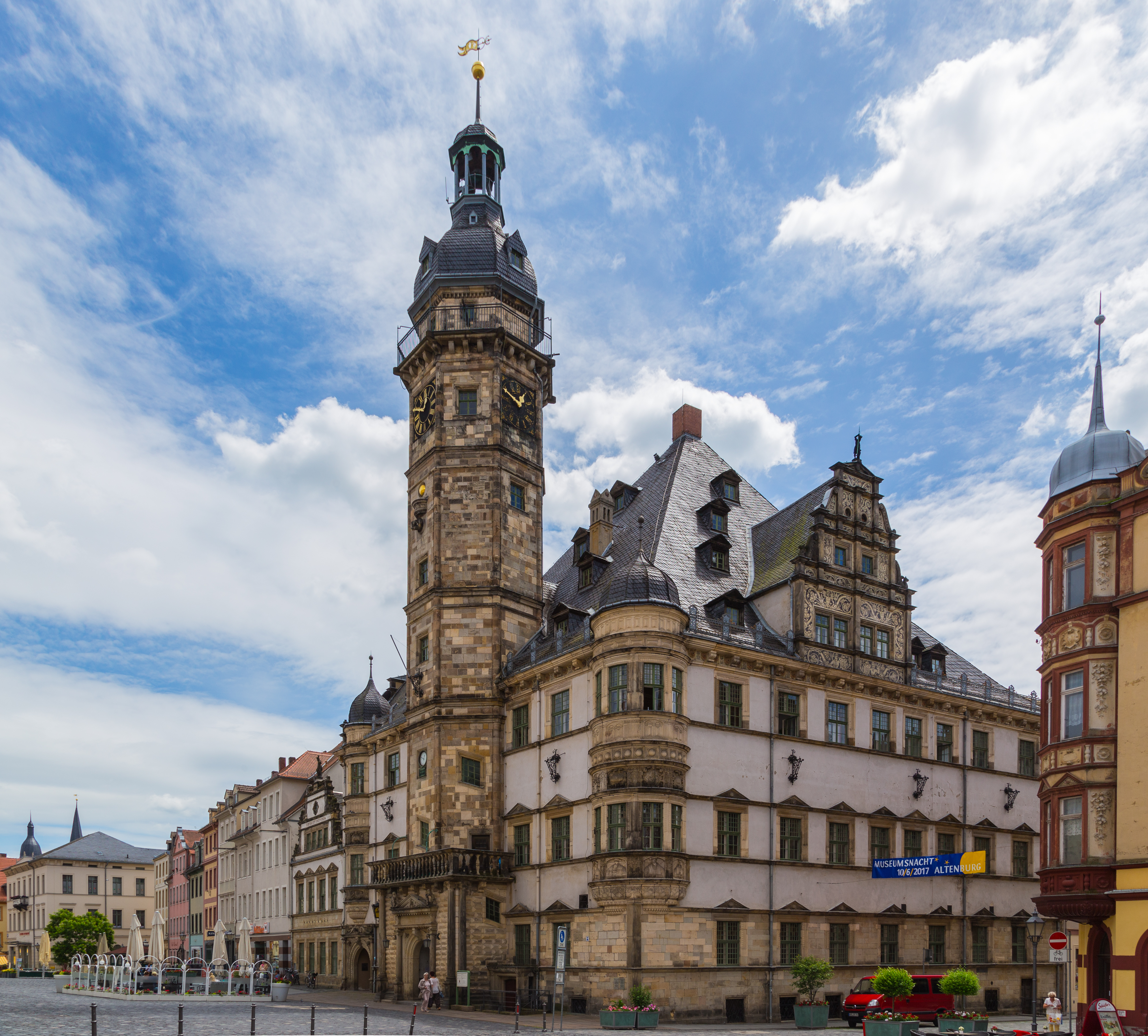
Town Hall (Rathaus) in Altenburg

The election for a new Landtag was held on 26 January 1919. Men and women 21 years of age and above had equal, secret and direct voting rights according to the principles of proportional representation. The Social Democrats won 59% of the votes and 24 seats, the liberal German Democratic Party followed with 25% and 10 seats, and the remaining votes and 6 seats went to the conservative German National People's Party (DNVP). The new government was formed from members of the SPD and DDP. It was the same as the interim government, with the exception that Wilhelm Tell was replaced by August Frölich of the SPD as lead minister.

The Free State's Landtag approved an interim constitution in April 1919. It was framed as a "stopgap measure for the hopefully short transition period to a unified state" and placed the regulation of the state's affairs in the hands of the people and their elected representatives. On 6 June the Landtag ratified the preliminary agreement on the unification of the Thuringian states by a vote of 27 to 8.

Also in June, the Landtag reached a financial settlement with Ernst II. He forfeited his lands and possessions to the state in return for a substantial monetary payment. Out of part of the settlement, he set up an endowment "to improve welfare, promote cultural and social endeavours and combat pulmonary tuberculosis". In exchange for it, he received back a large hunting lodge in Trokenborn-Wolfersdorf in today's Thuringia, where he lived for most of the rest of his life.

In late March 1919, representatives of the eight Thuringian states had met in Weimar to begin discussing plans to form a unified state. All except Coburg signed the “Community Agreement on the Merger of the Thuringian States” on 4 January 1920. Both houses of the Weimar Republic's parliament subsequently passed a federal law officially creating the State of Thuringia with its capital at Weimar. When the law became effective on 1 May 1920, the Free State of Saxe-Altenburg formally ceased to exist as a sovereign federal state. The "Law on the Administration of the Former Thuringian States During the Transition Period" of 9 December 1920 regulated the long process of reshaping the internal configuration of Thuringia's local and regional government bodies.
