= Saxe-Coburg and Gotha =

German duchy 1826–1918

Duchy of Saxe-Coburg and Gotha Herzogtum Sachsen-Coburg und Gotha (German)
- 1826–1918
- Top: Flag of Saxe-Coburg and Gotha (1826–1911); Bottom: Flag of Saxe-Coburg and Gotha (1911–1918) Coat of arms

- The Duchy of Saxe-Coburg and Gotha (red) within the German Empire
- Status: State of the German Confederation (1815–1866); Federal State of the German Empire (1867–1918)
- Capital: Gotha (northern part); Coburg (southern part)
- Common languages: German (Central Thuringian & East Franconian)
- Government: Constitutional monarchy
- Duke
  - 1826–1844: Ernest I
  - 1844–1893: Ernest II
  - 1893–1900: Alfred
  - 1900–1918: Charles Edward
- History
  - Established: 1826
  - German Revolution: 18 November 1918
- Currency: Conventionsthaler (to 1837); Saxon thaler (1837–57); Saxon Vereinsthaler (1841–76); German gold mark (1873–1914); Papiermark (1914–18)
Preceded by
Saxe-Coburg-Saalfeld
Saxe-Gotha-Altenburg
Succeeded by
Free State of Coburg
Free State of Saxe-Gotha
Free State of Gotha

Saxe-Coburg and Gotha (German: Sachsen-Coburg und Gotha), or Saxe-Coburg-Gotha (German: Sachsen-Coburg-Gotha [ˈzaksn̩ ˈkoːbʊʁk ˈɡoːta]), was an Ernestine duchy in Thuringia ruled by a branch of the House of Wettin, consisting of territories in the present-day states of Thuringia and Bavaria in Germany. It lasted from 1826 to 1918. In November 1918, Charles Edward, Duke of Saxe-Coburg and Gotha, was forced to abdicate. In 1920, the northern part of the duchy (since 1918 the Free State of Gotha; culturally and linguistically Thuringian) was merged with six other Thuringian free states to form the Free State of Thuringia: Saxe-Weimar-Eisenach (until 1918 a grand duchy), Saxe-Altenburg and Saxe-Meiningen (until 1918 duchies), Schwarzburg-Rudolstadt and Schwarzburg-Sondershausen (until 1918 principalities), as well as the People's State of Reuss (until 1918 the principalities of Reuss-Gera and Reuss-Greiz). The southern part of the duchy (since 1918 the Free State of Coburg; culturally and linguistically Franconian), as southernmost of the Thuringian states, was the only one which, after a referendum, became part of the Free State of Bavaria.

The name Saxe-Coburg-Gotha also refers to the family of the ruling House of Saxe-Coburg and Gotha, which played many varied roles in the dynastic and political history of Europe in the 19th and 20th centuries. In the early part of the 20th century, before the First World War, it was the family of the sovereigns of the United Kingdom, Belgium, Portugal, Bulgaria, and Saxe-Coburg-Gotha. In 1910, the Portuguese king was deposed, and the same thing occurred in Saxe-Coburg-Gotha in 1918 and in Bulgaria in 1946 (although effective control had already ceased two years prior due to a coup). As of 2026, a branch of the family still reigns in Belgium, and while the British line still technically exists up to the present day, it now uses the name Windsor due to a proclamation issued by King George V in 1917. The former Tsar of Bulgaria, Simeon II (reigned 1943–46), kept his surname while serving as the Prime Minister of Bulgaria from 2001 to 2005.

== History ==
Standard of the duke of Saxe-Coburg-Gotha as used by Charles Edward and his successors

The Duchy was born when the arbitration of the King of Saxony, Frederick Augustus, produced the Treaty of Hildburghausen on 12 November 1826 for the Gothaische Teilung (Gothan Division), the extensive rearrangement of the Ernestine duchies. After the extinction of the Saxe-Gotha-Altenburg line, the Duke of Saxe-Hildburghausen exchanged his Duchy for that of Saxe-Altenburg. The Saxe-Meiningen line became Saxe-Hildburghausen and got from Saxe-Coburg-Saalfeld the Saalfelder territories as well as the District of Themar and the places of Mupperg, Mogger, Liebau and Oerlsdorf. The Duchy of Saxe-Coburg-Saalfeld received for that the Duchy of Saxe-Coburg, Districts of Königsberg and Sonnefeld from Saxe-Hildburghausen, and the properties of Callenberg and Gauerstadt from Saxe-Meiningen.

By then, the Principality of Lichtenberg, on the Nahe River, had already been a part of the Duchy of Coburg for ten years. Ernest III, the sovereign of Saxe-Coburg-Saalfeld, had received it in 1816 from the Congress of Vienna for providing assistance to the Allies in their war against France. But, because of the great distance from Coburg and of the unrest caused by the Hambach Festival, the Duke sold the Principality in 1834 to Prussia.

The Thuringian states and their capitals until 1918 Free states 1918-1920; united as Thuringia since 1920 Ernestine duchies (Ernestines → House of Wettin) Duchy of Saxe-Coburg and Gotha (Gotha, Coburg) Grand Duchy of Saxe-Weimar-Eisenach (Weimar) Duchy of Saxe-Altenburg (Altenburg) Duchy of Saxe-Meiningen (Meiningen) Reussian principalities (House of Reuss → Vögte (advocates) of Weida, Gera and Plauen) Principality of Reuss-Gera (Gera) Principality of Reuss-Greiz (Greiz) United as People's State of Reuss (Gera) 1919-1920 Schwarzburgian principalities (House of Schwarzburg) Principality of Schwarzburg-Rudolstadt (Rudolstadt) Principality of Schwarzburg-Sondershausen (Sondershausen) Surrounding states and their capitals Kingdom of Prussia (Berlin), Province of Saxony (Magdeburg), Region of Erfurt (Erfurt) Kingdom of Prussia, Province of Hesse-Nassau (Kassel), Region of Kassel (Kassel) Kingdom of Prussia, Province of Saxony, Region of Merseburg (Merseburg) Kingdom of Bavaria (Munich) Kingdom of Saxony (Dresden) Not in the German Empire Austria-Hungary (Vienna), Cisleithania (Vienna), Kingdom of Bohemia (Prague)

The newly created Duchy of Saxe-Coburg and Gotha was initially a double duchy, ruled by Ernest III as Duke Ernest I in a personal union, but with only one vote in the Bundesrat. The opportunity to unify the two duchies in 1826 was missed. After the state constitution (Staatsgrundgesetz) of 1852, the duchies were bound in a political and real union. They were then a quasi-federal unitary state. Later attempts to merge the duchies failed in 1867 because the Landtag of Gotha did not want to assume the higher state debts of Coburg and in 1872 because of the questions about the administration of the whole union.

The Duchy of Saxe-Coburg and Gotha received on 3 May 1852 a national constitution, which had taken substantial parts of the fundamental rights from the Constitution of the National Assembly in Frankfurt. It also joined the German Zollverein in 1834, the North German Confederation in 1866 and the German Empire in 1871. At the Bundesrat in Berlin, where it had a seat, it kept its agents but, since 1913, like most of the other Thuringian states, it had to defer to the Grand Duchy of Saxe-Meiningen for the representation.

Ernest I died in 1844. His elder son and successor, Ernest II, ruled until his own death in 1893. Because he had died childless, the throne of the two duchies would have passed to his late brother Prince Albert's male descendants. But Prince Albert was the husband of Queen Victoria of the United Kingdom and his eldest son, Edward, the Prince of Wales, was already her heir apparent. Besides, he was prohibited by the constitutions of both duchies from inheriting the throne if there were other eligible male heirs. But he had already renounced his claim in favour of his next brother, Prince Alfred, Duke of Edinburgh. So Alfred became the next Duke of Saxe-Coburg and Gotha.

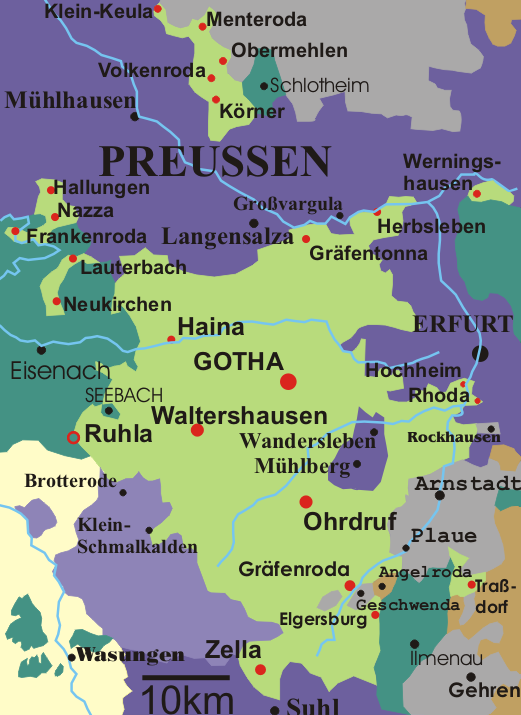
Republic of Saxe-Gotha then Free State of Saxe-Gotha

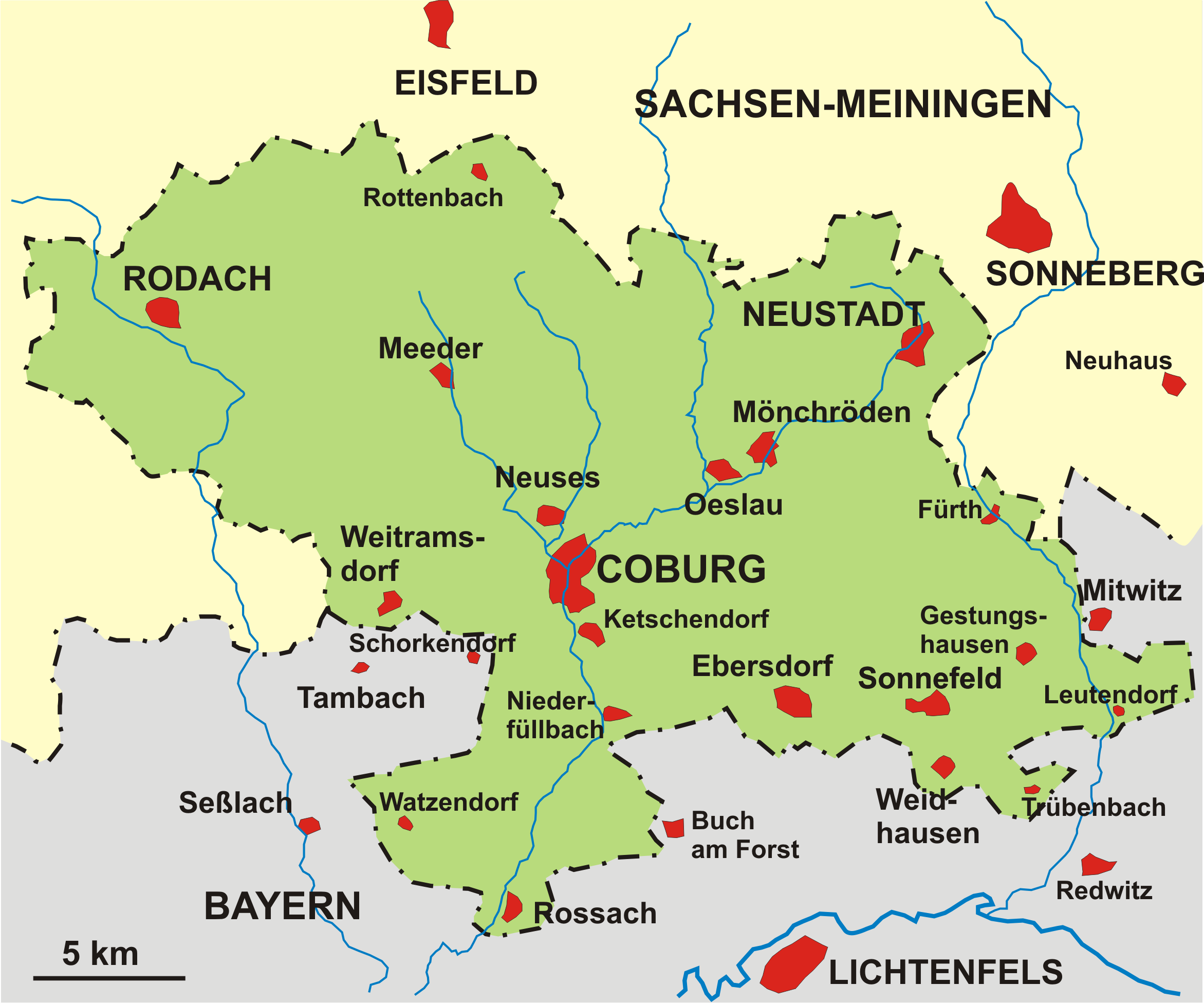
Free State of Coburg

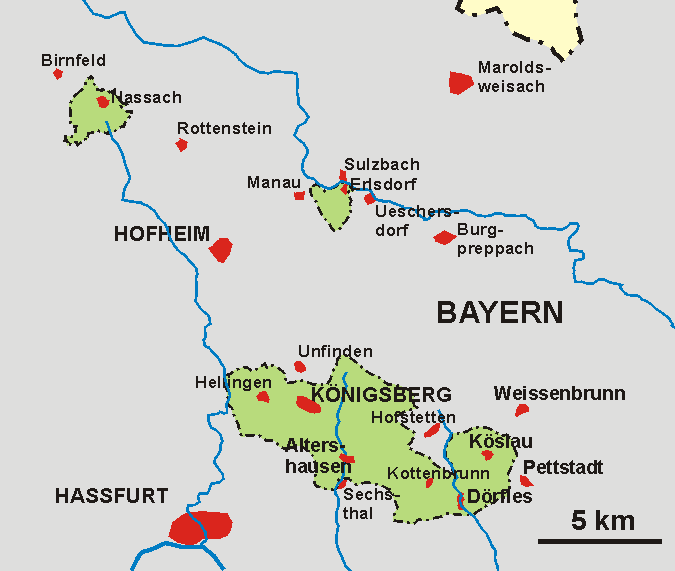
Enclave of the Free State of Saxe-Coburg, Königsberg in Bavaria

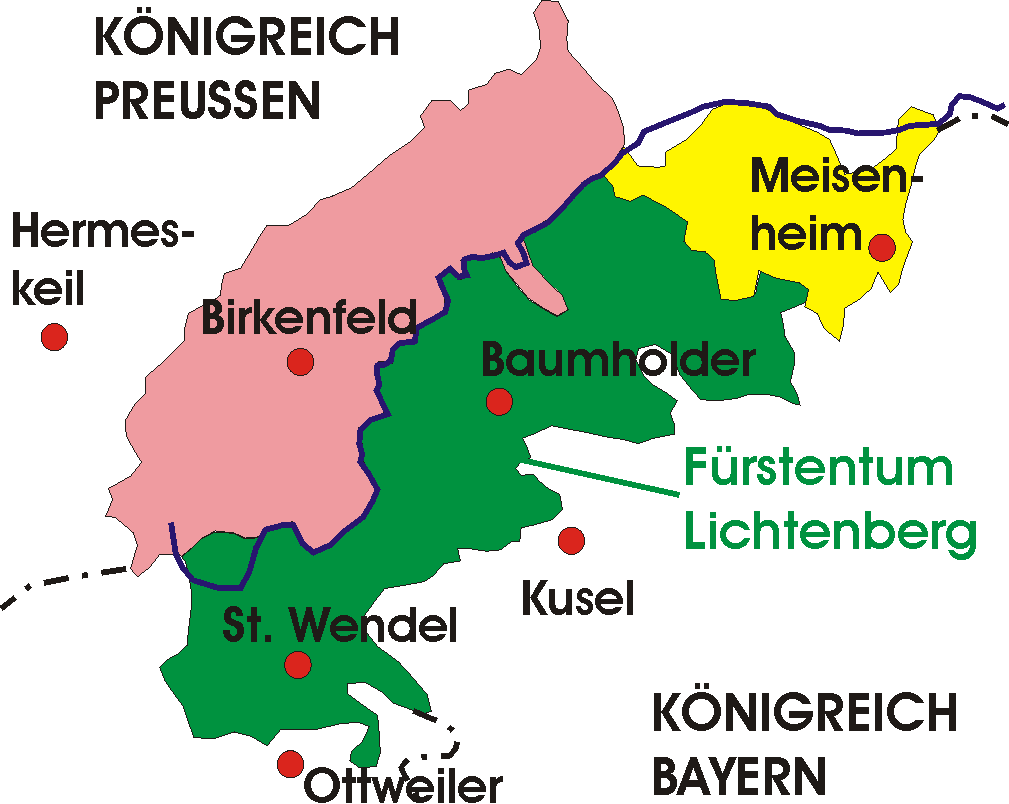
The Principality of Lichtenberg, (1816–1834)

Alfred's only son, also named Alfred, died in 1899, so when Duke Alfred died in 1900 he was succeeded by his nephew the Duke of Albany, the 16-year-old son of Queen Victoria's youngest son, Leopold (died 1884), as Duke Alfred's next brother Prince Arthur, Duke of Connaught and his son Prince Arthur of Connaught had renounced their own claims to the succession. Reigning as Duke Carl Eduard, Charles Edward, because of his age, began under the Regency of Prince Ernst von Hohenlohe-Langenburg until he came of age in 1905. The new duke also continued to use his British title, the Duke of Albany. But, because he chose to side with the Germans against the British in the First World War, he was stripped of his British titles in 1919.

After the November Revolution ended the monarchy in 1918, the duchy became two independent states, the Free State of Coburg and the Free State of Saxe-Gotha. Their leaders believed, however, that their new states were too small to be economically viable. On 1 May 1920, the Free State of Gotha became part of the new State of Thuringia. Following a referendum in the Free State of Coburg on 30 November 1919, it united with the Free State of Bavaria on 1 July 1920.

== Politics ==
In the German Empire, the Duchy had only one vote in the Bundesrat and two votes (for the two Duchies of Coburg and Gotha) in the Reichstag.

Each Duchy had its own Landtag, elected every four years by male taxpayers over 25 years of age. Only males 30 years or older were eligible to stand for the elections. The Coburger assembly had 11 members and its twin in Gotha had 19. The assemblies met every year but, every two years, they would combine, alternatively in Gotha and Coburg, for the matters and questions that involve both Duchies.

For both duchies, however, there was a Ministry of State in Gotha but Coburg and Gotha had their own subordinate and almost independent ministries. The Minister of State directed Gotha's Ducal ministry but, for both Duchies, he was responsible for the state affairs, the economical and commercials policies, the judiciary and the conduct of Imperial laws. In Coburg, for state matters as such as community services, police duties, support of the state church, and education, as well as management of assets and finances, and also, until 1891, court matters, the local authorities could not interfere with the decisions from Gotha.

The finances of both Duchies remained basically disconnected. But, in their management, a distinction was always made between the Crown revenue from the domains and the State revenue from taxes and duties. Every four years, a common budget, especially in the financial dealings with the German Empire, was made, even if it interfered with the local and national operations of the two Duchies. Grants from the state budgets of both Duchies were made in the ratio of 7 to 3 between Gotha and Coburg.

Because of its size and finances, the Duchy did not have ambassadors but it did have trade consuls. They were for trade with Austria-Hungary, Belgium, Argentina, Brazil, Chile, Cuba, Ecuador, France, Great Britain, Italy, Mexico, Peru, Portugal, Prussia, Russia, Spain, Switzerland, and Turkey. The United States had its own consul in Coburg from 1897 to 1918.

During the American Civil War, Ernst Raven was assigned to the position of consul in the state of Texas. He applied to the Confederate Government for a diplomatic exequatur on 30 July 1861 and was accepted.

== Military ==
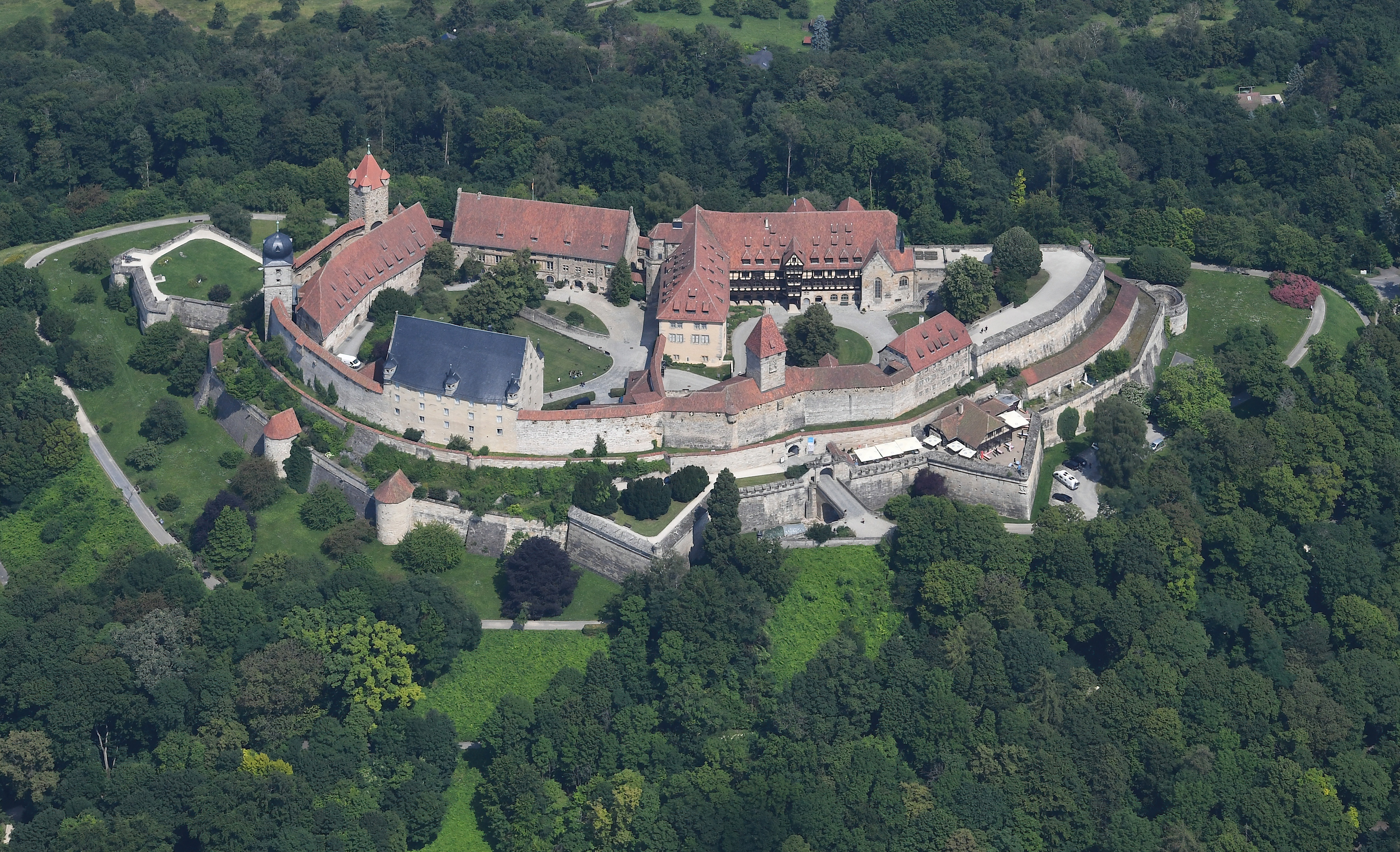
Coburg Fortress

Before 1867, the Duchy of Saxe-Coburg and Gotha had its own Army. But, on 26 June 1867, because of a treaty signed in 1866 with Prussia, its Army was added, for defending and recruiting purposes, to the 6th Thuringian Infantry Regiment No. 95 of the 22nd Division of the XIth Army Corps. Three battalions of the 6th Thuringian were assigned to Gotha (No. 1), Hildburghausen (No. 2) and Coburg (No. 3) but the Corps headquarters was in Kassel. Unlike Prussia, where military service was mandatory, Saxe-Coburg and Gotha filled its quota in the Imperial Army with the draft.

== Miscellaneous ==
The capitals of Saxe-Coburg and Gotha were Coburg and Gotha. By 1914 the area and populations of the two duchies were:

Duchy	Area		Population
Duchy	km^{2}	sq mi	Population
Saxe-Coburg	562	217	74,818
Saxe-Gotha	1,415	546	182,359
Total	1,977	763	257,177

There are two residences in Gotha and Coburg. Therefore, the whole ducal court, including the Court Theater, had to move twice a year: from Gotha to Coburg for the summer, from Coburg to Gotha for the winter. For the Court Theater, two almost identical buildings had to be built in 1840 in Gotha (destroyed in the Second World War) and Coburg (now the Coburg State Theater) and thereafter maintained at the same time. In addition to the residential castles, Friedenstein in Gotha and Ehrenburg in Coburg, the Ducal family also used the Schloss Reinhardsbrunn in Gotha as well as the Rosenau and Callenberg castles in Coburg and the hunting lodge Greinburg Castle, Grein, Austria (the latter two still today owned by the ducal branch of the House of Saxe-Coburg and Gotha).

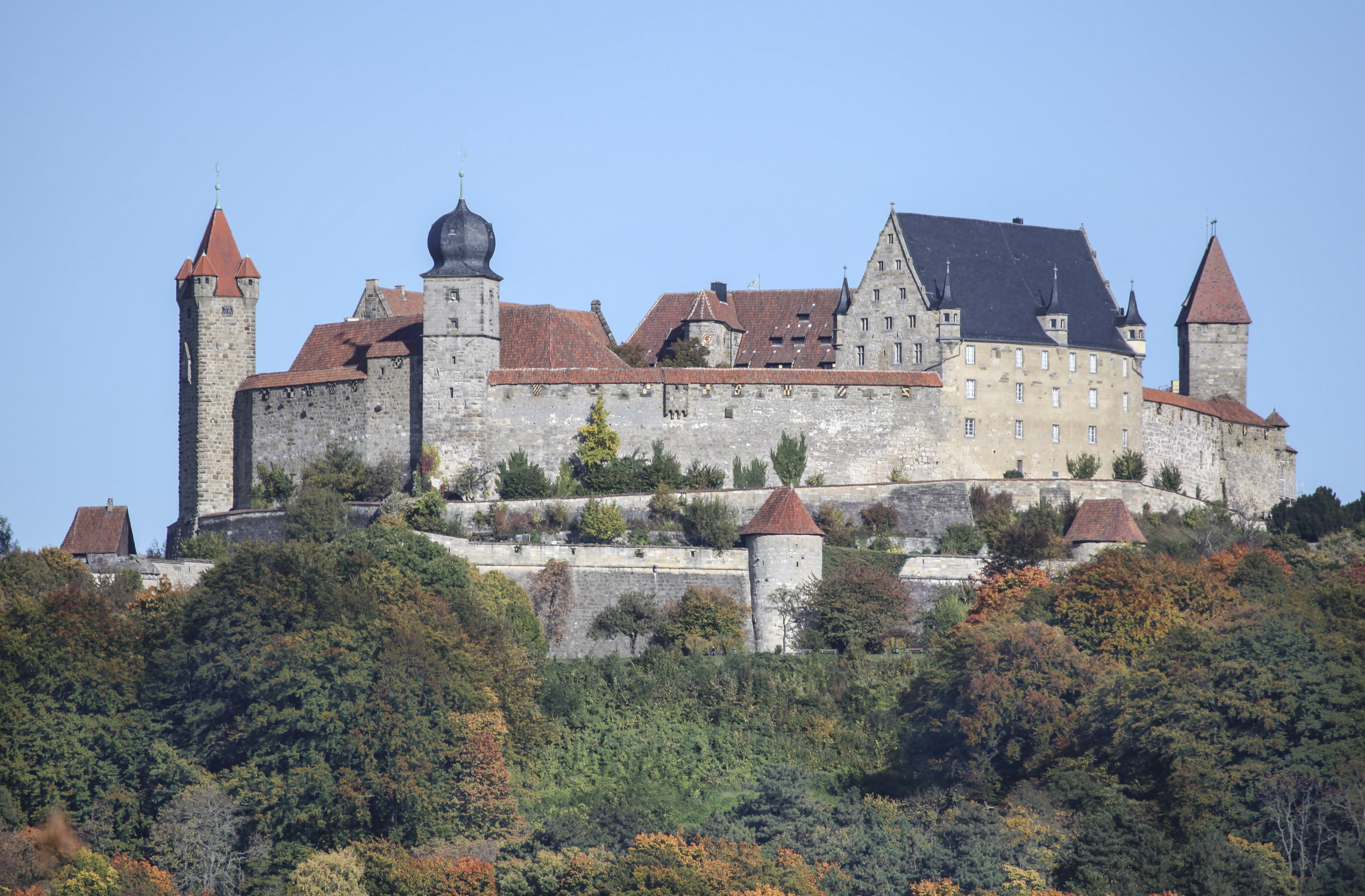
Veste Coburg

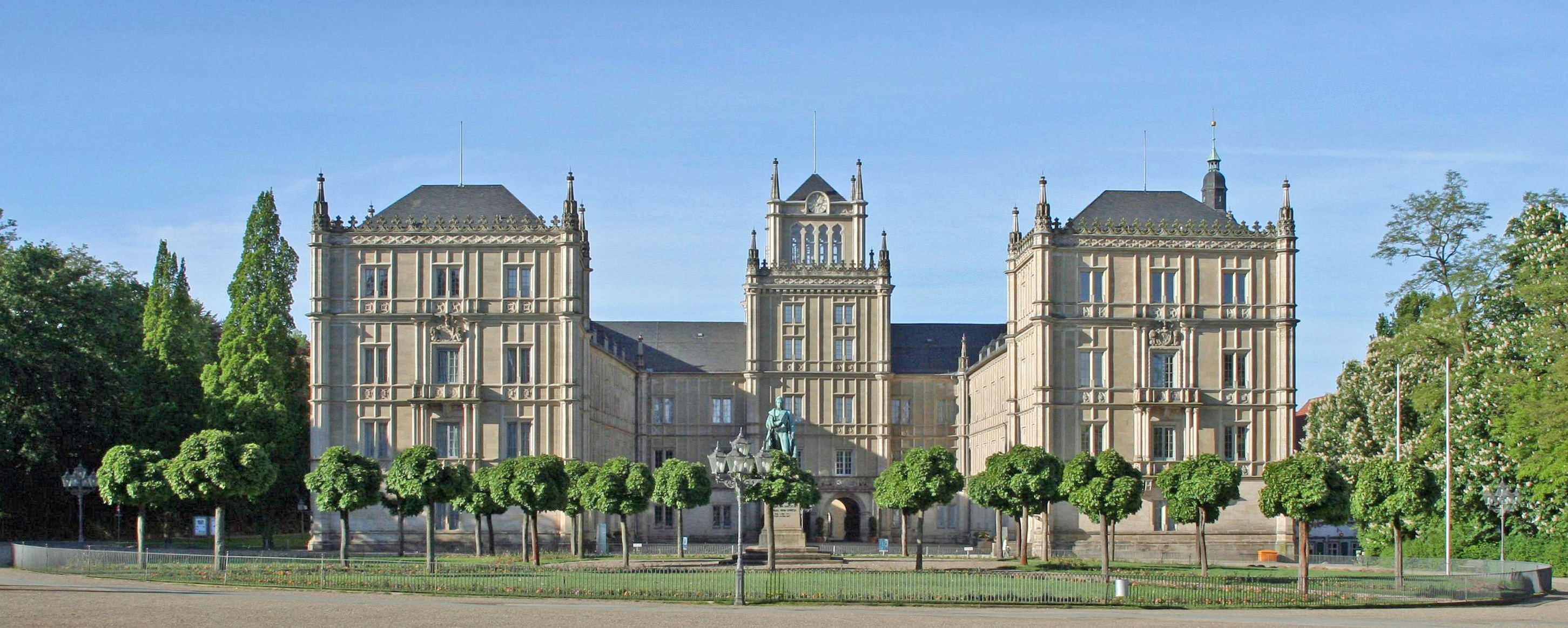
Ehrenburg Palace, Coburg

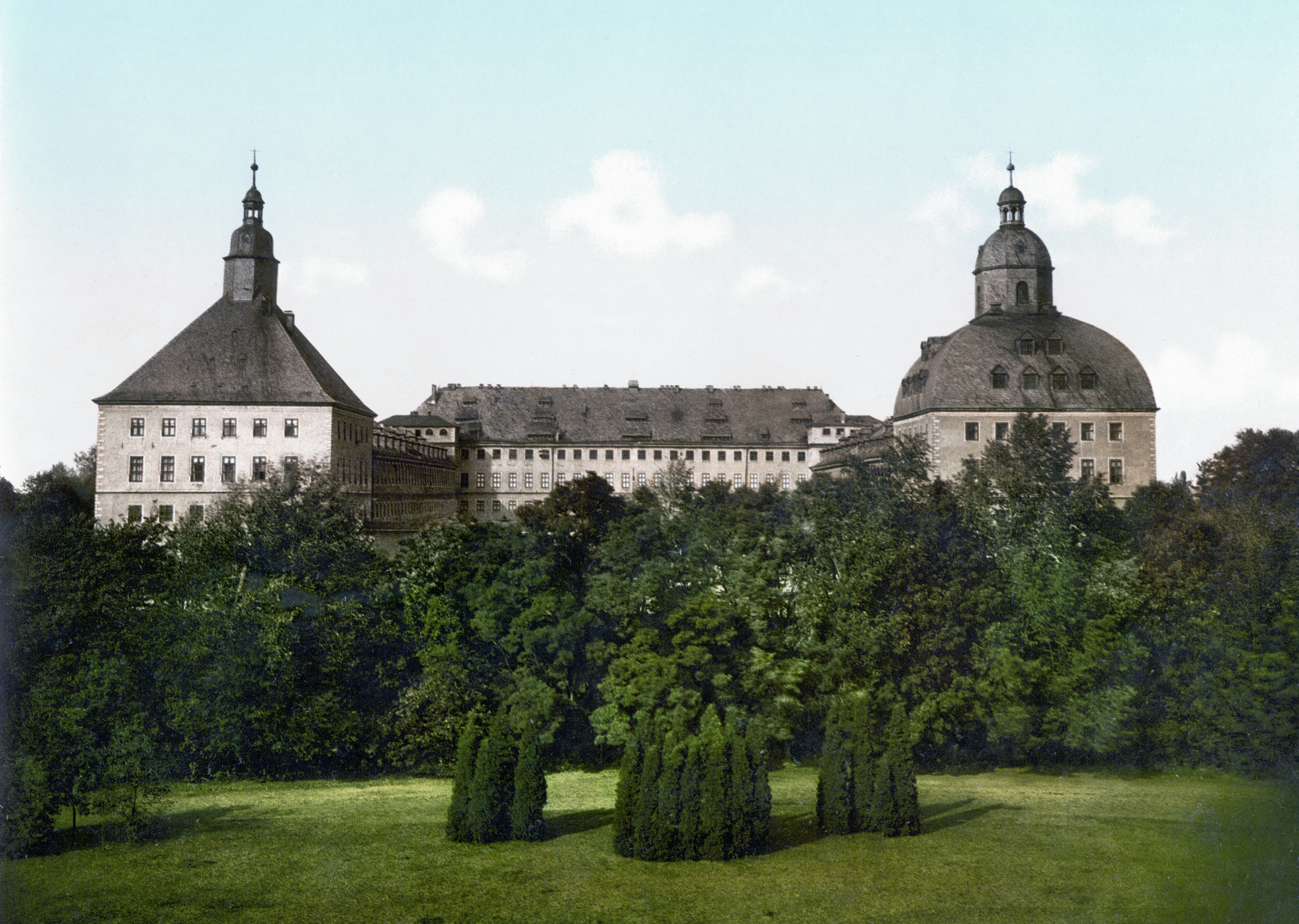
Friedenstein Palace, Gotha

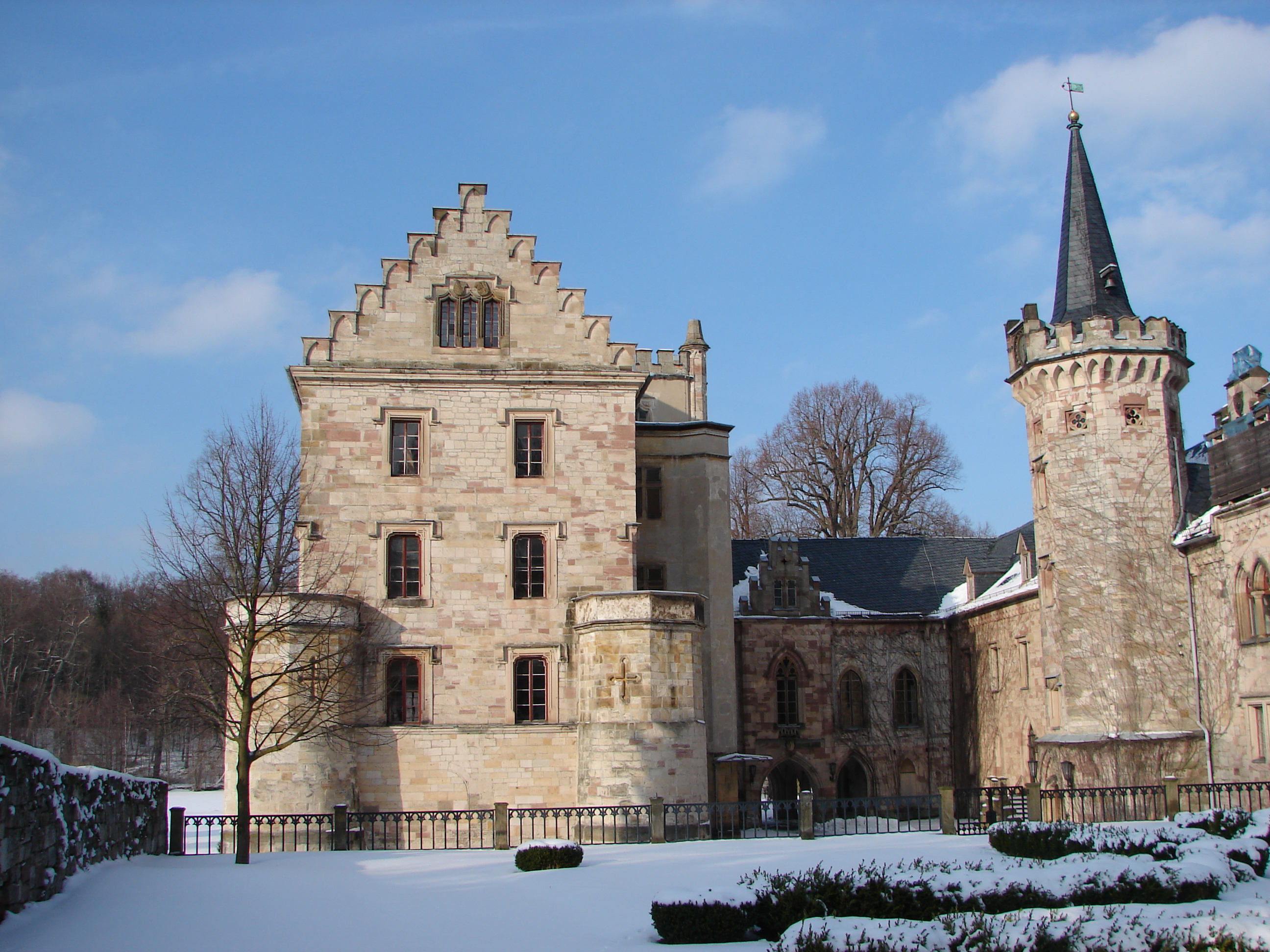
Reinhardsbrunn Castle, Gotha

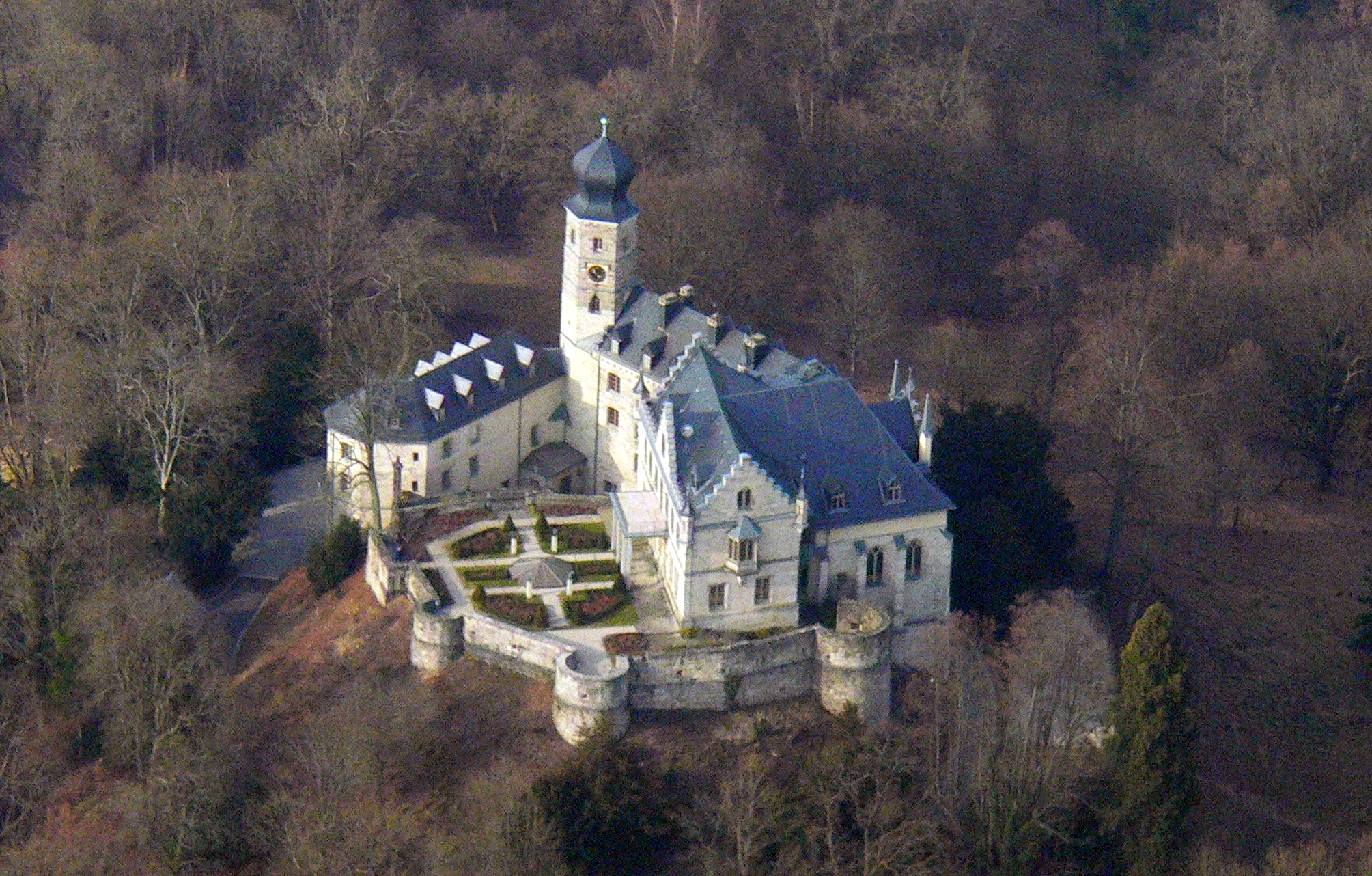
Callenberg Castle, Coburg

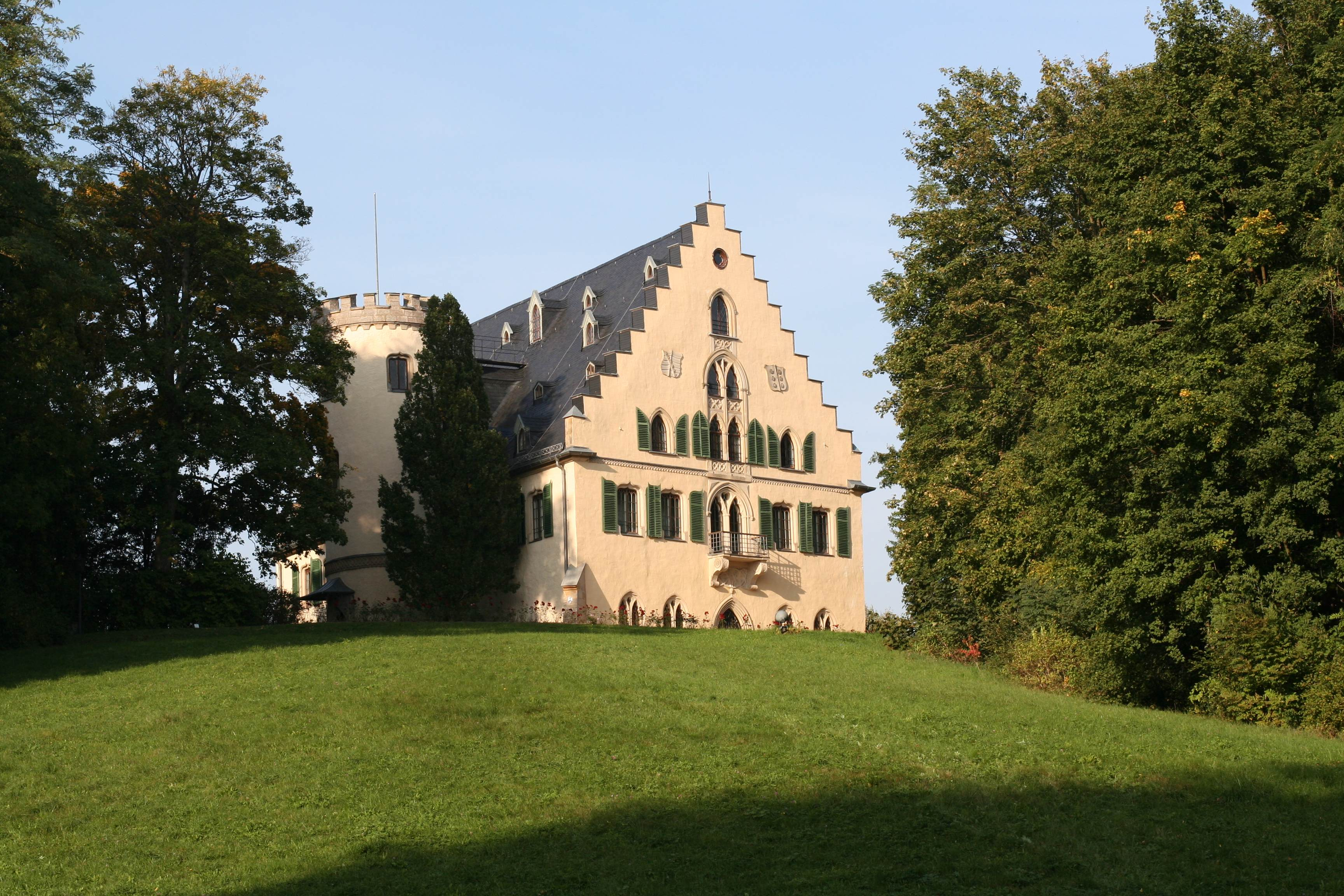
Rosenau Castle, Coburg

Only the Duchy of Gotha, along with nearby Duchies of Saxe-Meiningen and Saxe-Altenburg and especially the Grand Duchy of Saxe-Weimar-Eisenach – was able to be one of the sponsoring states of the University of Jena. Coburg did not have its own university. It did not have its court of law, either. Gotha had its own court of law while Coburg had to go to Meiningen for the legal administration.

== Ruler ==
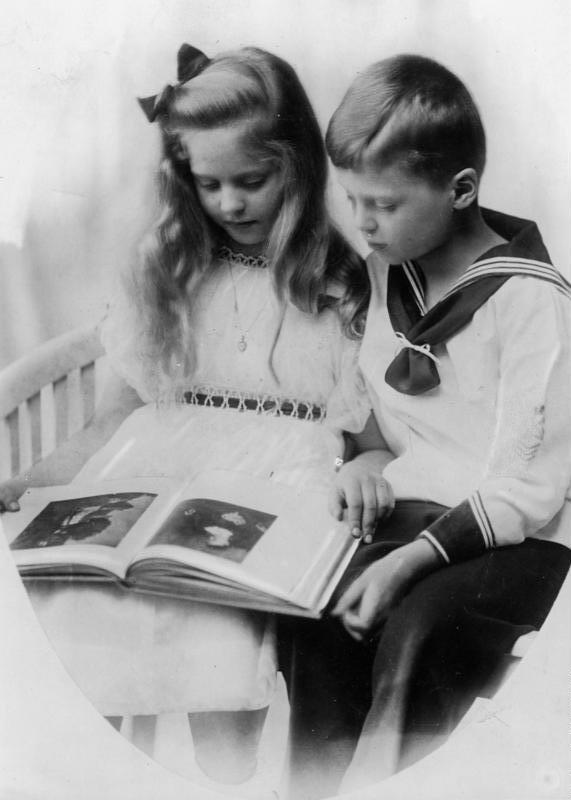
The children of the Duke of Saxe-Coburg and Gotha in 1917: Princess Sibylle and Prince Hubertus

=== Titles and styles of the Sovereign of the House ===
According to the Staatsgrundgesetz (House law) of the Duchy of Saxe-Coburg and Gotha, the full title of the Duke was:

Wir, Ernst, Herzog zu Sachsen-Coburg und Gotha, Jülich, Cleve und Berg, auch Engern und Westphalen, Landgraf in Thüringen, Markgraf zu Meißen, gefürsteter Graf zu Henneberg, Graf zu der Mark und Ravensberg, Herr zu Ravenstein und Tonna usw.

Translation: We, Ernest, Duke of Saxe-Coburg and Gotha, Jülich, Cleves and Berg, also Angria and Westphalia, Landgrave in Thuringia, Margrave of Meissen, Princely Count of Henneberg, Count of the Mark and Ravensberg, Lord of Ravenstein and Tonna, et cetera.

=== Titles and styles of other members of the House ===
The use of Ducal and Princely titles may be restricted if the marriage conflicts with the requirements of the Staatsgrundgesetz or if a member of the House renounces his claims for himself and his descendants.

== Dukes of Saxe-Coburg and Gotha (1826–1918) ==
Coat of arms of Saxe-Coburg and Gotha

Heraldic shield of Saxe-Coburg and Gotha

- Ernest I, Duke of Saxe-Coburg and Gotha (1784–1844) reigned 1826–1844
  - Ernest II, Duke of Saxe-Coburg and Gotha (1818–1893) reigned 1844–1893
  - Prince Albert of Saxe-Coburg and Gotha (1819–1861), Prince Consort of the United Kingdom of Great Britain and Ireland 1840–1861
    - King Edward VII of the United Kingdom (1841–1910), reigned as king 1901–1910;
    - Alfred, Duke of Saxe-Coburg and Gotha, Duke of Edinburgh (1844–1900), reigned 1893–1900
      - Alfred, Hereditary Prince of Saxe-Coburg and Gotha (1874–1899), predeceased father
    - Prince Arthur, Duke of Connaught and Strathearn (1850–1942)
      - Prince Arthur of Connaught (1883–1938)
        - Alastair Windsor, 2nd Duke of Connaught and Strathearn (1914–1943)
    - Prince Leopold, Duke of Albany (1853–1884)
      - Charles Edward, Duke of Saxe-Coburg and Gotha (1884–1954), reigned 1900–1918, abdicated 1918

== State Ministers of Saxe-Coburg and Gotha (1824–1919) ==
- 1824–1840 Christoph Anton Ferdinand von Carlowitz
- 1840–1840 Dietrich [Carl August] Freiherr von Stein (first time)
- 1840–1846 Georg Ferdinand von Lepel
- 1846–1849 Dietrich [Carl August] Freiherr von Stein (second time)
- 1849–1888 Camillo Freiherr von Seebach
- 1888–1891 Gisbert von Bonin
- 1891–1900 Office Vacant
- 1900–1905 [Philipp Hermann] Otto von Hentig
- 1905–1914 Ernst [Friedrich Hermann] von Richter
- 1914–1919 Hans Barthold von Bassewitz

== See also ==
- Ernestine duchies
- Palais Coburg in Vienna

== Bibliography ==
- Dressel, Carl-Christian H., Die Entwicklung von Verfassung und Verwaltung in Sachsen-Coburg 1800–1826 im Vergleich(The Development and Comparison of the Constitution and Administration of Saxe-Coburg 1880 – 1826) (Berlin: Duncker & Humblot, 2007), ISBN 978-3-428-12003-1, Subscription required. (in German)
- Erdmann, Jürgen, Coburg, Bayern und das Reich 1918–1923 (Coburg, Bavaria and the Empire 1918–1923), Coburg, Druckhaus und Vesteverlag A. Rossteutscher, 1969, (Coburger Heimatkunde und Landesgeschichte Reihe 2, 22 (Coburger Studies of State and Local History Series 2, Nr 22), ZDB-ID 1151614-8) (simultaneously: University of Würzburg, Dissertation, 1969: Coburg in den Anfangsjahren der Weimarer Republik 1918–1923 (Coburg in the Beginning of the Weimar Republic Years 1918–1923)) (in German)
- Homann, Johann B[aptist]., Die Herzogtümer Gotha, Coburg und Altenburg 1729. Historische Karte (The Duchies of Gotha, Coburg and Altenburg 1729. Historical Maps), Tabula Geographica Principatus Gotha, Coburg, Altenburg (Geographical Maps of the Principalities of Gotha, Coburg and Altenburg 1729), Bad Langensalza, Verlag Rockstuhl, 1999 (reprint), ISBN 3-929000-78-4. (in German)
- Niclas, Thomas, Das Haus Sachsen-Coburg – Europas späte Dynastie (The House of Saxe-Coburg – Europe's Last Dynasty), Stuttgart, Kohlhammer Verlag, 2003, ISBN 3-17-017243-3. (in German)
- Sandner, Harold, Das Haus von Sachsen-Coburg und Gotha 1826 bis 2001 (The House of Saxe-Coburg and Gotha 1826 to 2001), Coburg, Neue Presse GmbH, 2004. ISBN 3-00-008525-4. (in German)
