= Free State of Saxe-Gotha =

German state (1918–1920)

Free State of Saxe-Gotha Freistaat Sachsen-Gotha (German)
- 1918–1920
- Flag

- Location of Saxe-Gotha (north) and Coburg (south) within the German Empire

- Saxe-Gotha (northernmost of the 2 darker green areas) within the Thuringian states
- Capital: Gotha
- Area
  - Coordinates: 50°56′57″N 10°42′18″E
  - 1919: 1,415 km^{2} (546 sq mi)
- Population
  - 1919: 189,200
  - Type: Republic
- Historical era: Interwar period
  - Established: 1918
  - Disestablished: 1920
Preceded by	Succeeded by
Saxe-Coburg and Gotha	Thuringia
- Today part of: Germany

The Free State of Saxe-Gotha (German: Freistaat Sachsen-Gotha) was a small, short-lived (1918–1920) central German state during the early years of the Weimar Republic. It was formed following the dissolution of the Duchy of Saxe-Coburg and Gotha during the German revolution of 1918–1919. Saxe-Coburg split away and formed a separate state due in part to the more radical nature of the revolution in Saxe-Gotha. The federal government saw the strength of Saxe-Gotha's workers' movement as a potential threat and twice sent troops against them.

The Free State of Saxe-Gotha was formally established as a parliamentary republic shortly before it merged with six other small states to form Thuringia on 1 May 1920. Coburg became part of Bavaria two months later.

== Predecessor state ==
The predecessor of the Free State of Saxe-Gotha was the Duchy of Saxe-Coburg and Gotha. It was initially a double duchy ruled in personal union, but with the enactment of the Constitution of 1852 the tie became a real union. The duchy from that point shared state ministers and had a common Landtag (state assembly), nineteen of whose members represented Gotha and eleven Coburg. It became a constituent state of the German Empire in 1871, with two seats in the Reichstag and one in the Bundesrat. Its last ruler was Duke Charles Edward (1900–1918).

== Revolution of 1918 ==
The Duchy of Saxe-Coburg and Gotha broke apart during the revolution of 1918–1919, which brought down the German Empire and all of Germany's royal houses at the end of World War I. The revolution began at the end of October 1918 with a sailors' mutiny at Kiel. The rebellious sailors set up a workers' and soldiers' council and in early November spread the revolt across the rest of Germany. Emperor Wilhelm II fled to Holland on 10 November, and councils quickly took power from the existing military, royal and civil authorities with little resistance or bloodshed.

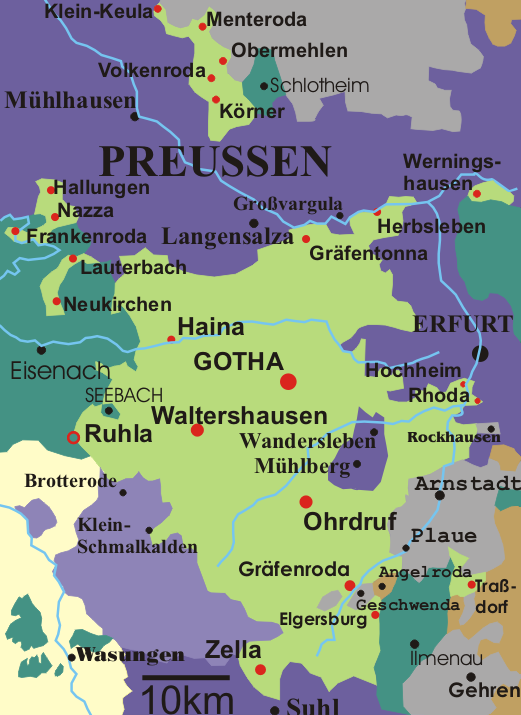
Saxe-Gotha is shown in light green. The state labeled 'Preussen' on the map is Prussia.

The revolution reached Saxe-Coburg and Gotha on 8 November 1918 when soldiers at Gotha's military airfield set up a workers' and soldiers' council with the support of Gotha Reichstag member Wilhelm Bock. The next day, on Gotha's main market square, Bock proclaimed the council to be the provisional government of the new Gotha Republic and declared Duke Charles Edward deposed. A council of the people's deputies, all of whose members belonged to the radical left Independent Social Democratic Party (USPD) – which had been founded in Gotha in 1917 – then took control in the city.

At a session of the joint parliament of Saxe-Coburg and Gotha on 14 November, a document signed by the Duke was read aloud. It stated that he would relinquish his government duties but did not say that he was abdicating. Members of the USPD and the workers' and soldiers' councils then tried unsuccessfully to abolish the Duchy's constitution and replace it with a soviet republic. Following the failure of the proposal, the combined parliament dissolved itself.

== First Landtag election and separation from Coburg ==
Saxe-Gotha's provisional revolutionary government set 25 February 1919 as the election date for its first Landtag. The campaign was overshadowed by the occupation of Gotha by Freikorps units under General Maercker on 18 February. Maercker had been charged with protecting the National Assembly, which was meeting in Coburg's capital of Weimar while serving as Germany's interim parliament and writing a constitution for the new German republic. The government in Berlin ordered Maercker into Gotha to disarm workers in the city. They responded with a general strike, which in turn triggered a citizens' strike. After eight days of street fighting between the Freikorps and workers, the troops withdrew.

Voting for the Landtag was universal (women and men), equal and direct. The USPD won an absolute majority with 52.6% of the votes and 10 of 19 seats. The Social Democrats, who had won the largest share of the votes for the Weimar National Assembly, took only one seat in Saxe-Gotha with just over 5% of the vote. The new Saxe-Gotha government differed little from the Council of the People's Deputies that had preceded it. All of its members belonged to the USPD, with Otto Geithner at its head.

The separation of Saxe-Gotha and Saxe-Coburg was finalized on 12 April in the “State Treaty on the Administration of the Common Affairs of the Free States of Coburg and Gotha”. Legal ties such as joint representation at the federal level and a shared judiciary made the separation difficult, and it was not completed until 1924. After Duke Charles Edward rejected a settlement offer of 15 million marks for the loss of his possessions in Saxe-Gotha, the Landtag approved the only expropriation of a prince's property in post-war Germany, although the law was overturned by the Reich Court on 18 June 1925. In the summer of 1919, a draft constitution incorporating a council system failed in the Landtag. The Free State's parliamentary-democratic constitution, based on a draft by Hermann Brill (USPD), was passed on 24 December 1919.

== Conflicts with the Reich ==
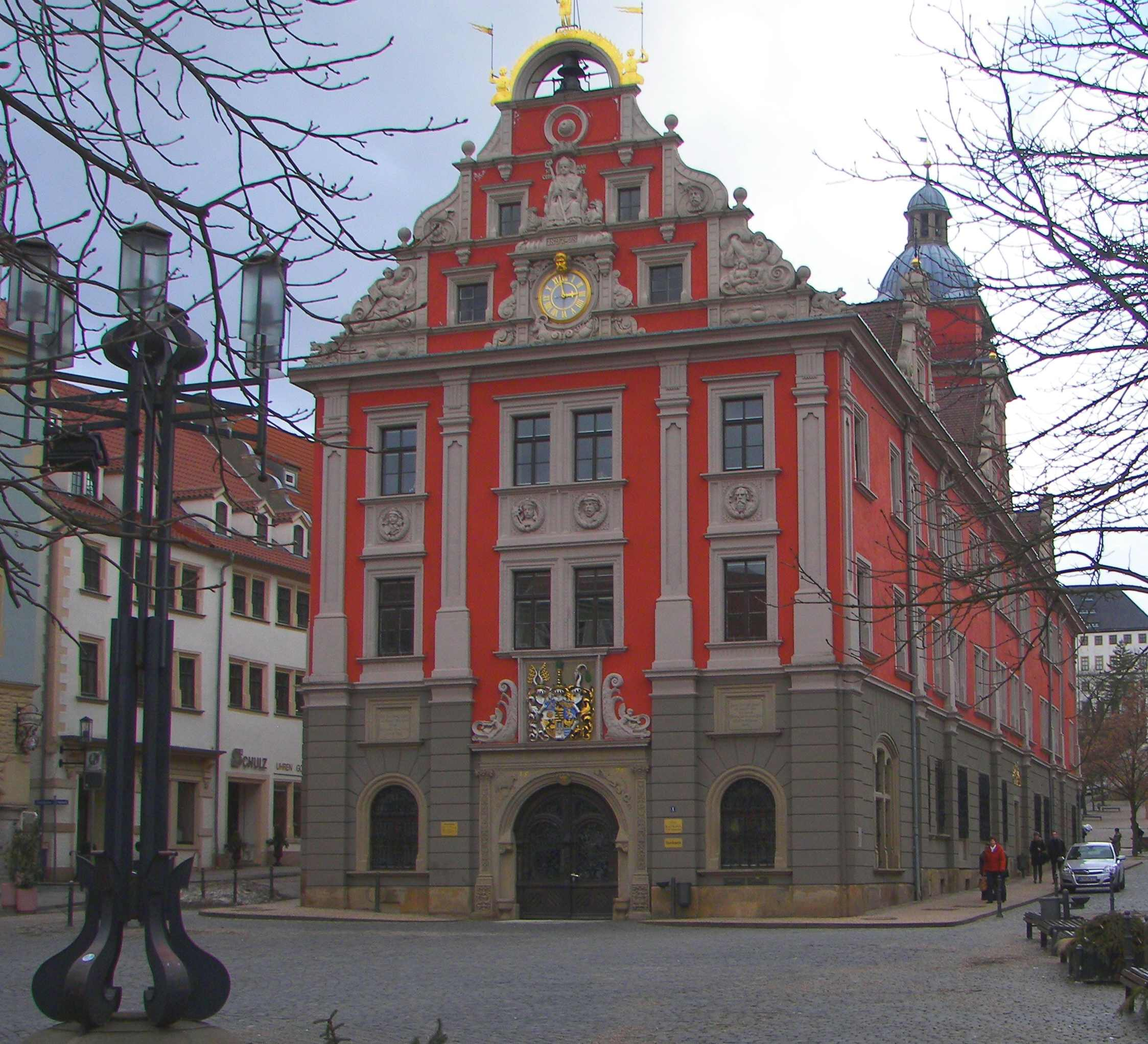
Gotha's historic city hall (Rathaus)

In response to the right-wing Kapp Putsch in Berlin in March 1920, Saxe-Gotha's USPD-led government called for a general strike. Workers armed themselves and set up a 40-member executive council (Vollzugsrat). A Reichswehr unit was sent from Erfurt to Gotha on 13 March and attempted to oust Saxe-Gotha's democratically elected government. Serious clashes then broke out, with 127 deaths counted before the fighting ended on 19 March. The following day, members of the armed volunteer Marburg Student Corps drove 15 workers from Gotha to the nearby village of Mechterstädt near Gotha and shot them.

On 29 March, the eight members of the middle-class parties in the Landtag called for the state government to resign, citing the way it had handled the events during the Kapp Putsch. When it refused, they resigned their seats in order to force new elections by making it impossible for the assembly to function. The ten USPD members continued to meet, leading the opposition to lodge a complaint with the federal minister of the Interior on 31 March, calling the situation unconstitutional. Their plea, together with the role of the workers' executive committee in Saxe-Gotha's government, triggered a Reichsexekution – a federal intervention against a member state – against Saxe-Gotha on 10 April. A state of emergency was imposed, a Reich commissioner (Wilhelm Holle) was appointed to take over control in the Free State, the Landtag was dissolved and a new election scheduled.

Since the USPD ministers would not cooperate with the Reich commissioner, he installed a government led by two high-ranking civil servants. In the election on 30 May 1920, the USPD dropped from 10 to 9 seats, enough for it to lose its majority in the Landtag. On 15 June, a government was formed with one member each from the right-of-center German People's Party (DVP), the liberal German Democratic Party (DDP) and the conservative Thuringian Agricultural League (Landbund).

== Transition to the State of Thuringia ==
In late March 1919, representatives of the eight Thuringian states had met in Weimar to begin discussing plans to form a unified state. All except Coburg signed the “Community Agreement on the Merger of the Thuringian States” on 4 January 1920. Both houses of the Weimar Republic's parliament subsequently passed a federal law officially creating the State of Thuringia. When the law became effective on 1 May 1920, the Free State of Saxe-Gotha formally ceased to exist as a sovereign federal state. The “Law on the Administration of the Former Thuringian states during the Transition Period” of 9 December 1920 transformed the Free State of Gotha into a higher-level municipal association with regional representation and a regional government. It lasted until 1 April 1923, when all of Thuringia's transition laws lapsed.
