= Thuringian states =

Several federal states within the German Reich

Data for 1910
Area:	12,325 km^{2}
Population:	1,585,356
Map
The Thuringian States in 1910

The Thuringian states (German: Thüringische Staaten) refers to the following eight German federal states within the German Empire:

- The Grand Duchy of Saxe-Weimar-Eisenach, officially the Grand Duchy of Saxony (Großherzogtum Sachsen) from 1903
- The duchies of Saxe-Altenburg, Saxe-Coburg and Gotha and Saxe-Meiningen (Herzogtum Sachsen-Altenburg, Herzogtum Sachsen-Coburg und Gotha, Herzogtum Sachsen-Meiningen)
- The principalities of Reuss Elder Line (Fürstentum Reuß Ältere Linie), Reuss Younger Line (Fürstentum Reuß Jüngere Linie), Schwarzburg-Rudolstadt (Fürstentum Schwarzburg-Rudolstadt) and Schwarzburg-Sondershausen (Fürstentum Schwarzburg-Sondershausen)

== Territory ==
These lands were bordered to the north and west by Prussian regions, especially the Regierungsbezirk of Erfurt, and also those of Kassel and Merseburg, in places as enclaves. In addition, numerous Prussian exclaves were mixed in among the Thuringian states. These were the county (Landkreis) of Schleusingen and town of Suhl, the county of Herrschaft Schmalkalden and Barchfeld, the region around Wandersleben and Mühlberg, the county of Ziegenrück and town of Ranis, and the villages of Kamsdorf, Blankenberg, Sparnberg, Blintendorf and Gefell, which belonged to the county of Ziegenrück but were separated from it. Other Prussian exclaves were the villages of Abtlöbnitz near Camburg and Kischlitz near Eisenberg.

To the east, the Kingdom of Saxony was the neighbouring state, which also had various exclaves. These were Liebschwitz near Gera with the municipalities and lands of Lengefeld, Liebschwitz, Lietzsch, Niebra, Pösneck, and Taubenpreskeln, as well as the neighbouring municipalities of Hilbersdorf, Loitzsch, Rückersdorf, Thonhausen and Grobsdorf. Also worth mentioning are the municipality of Bocka near Altenburg and Kauritz near Meerane.

The Kleinstaaterei (territorial fragmentation) was highly valued, but on the territory of the present Free State of Thuringia in the early 20th century there were eight small states, Prussian areas in several provinces, and several small Saxon exclaves. The fragmentation of the states was made particularly acute because the little states did not form single enclosed territories, but were scattered in a confusing melange. In 1913 there was an exchange of land between Saxe-Weimar-Eisenach and Saxe-Meiningen. The Meiningen village of Lichtenhain outside Jena was exchanged for parts of Kranichfeld that belonged to Weimar. It led to a tidying up of the boundaries in Kranichfeld, but the Meiningen exclave of Kranichfeld was not removed, but enlarged. Apparently Saxe-Weimar-Eisenach could not or would not offer other land for exchange.

== History ==
During the period of the German Empire, the Thuringian states each had a voice in the Bundesrat – in all eight votes. They thus formed a significant block, especially when one considers that the Kingdom of Saxony had only four votes. The Thuringian states, however, rarely agreed with one another. Until 1903, five states were represented by the Weimar delegate in the Bundesrat. Saxe-Coburg and Gotha had its own delegate, Saxe-Meiningen was represented by Bavaria and Reuss Elder Line by Mecklenburg-Schwerin.

The Higher Regional Court (Oberlandesgericht) of Jena was, according to the new Imperial Court Constitution Act (Reichsgerichtsverfassungsgesetz) of 1 October 1878, the only institution that was responsible for all the Thuringian states, except for Schwarzburg-Sondershausen, which fell under the jurisdiction of the Oberlandesgericht in Naumburg. A second common institution was the University of Jena with the Ernestine duchies as their sponsor states, although from 1817 the Duchy of Saxe-Coburg was no longer part of them.

In November 1918, as was the case in the whole of the German Empire, the reigning dukes and princes abdicated. The old Thuringian duchies and principalities became free states.

The two free states of Reuss E.L. and Reuss Y.L. formed an administrative union on 21 December 1918 and united as the Republic of Reuss on 4 April 1919; the union between Saxe-Gotha and Saxe-Coburg was dissolved on 12 April 1919, and they formed their own free states.

The governments of Saxe-Altenburg, Coburg, Saxe-Gotha, Saxe-Meiningen, Saxe-Weimar-Eisenach, Schwarzburg-Rudolstadt, Schwarzburg-Sondershausen and the Republic of Reuss took part in negotiations about a merger of all Thuringian states, if possible including the Prussian elements. But because Prussia was not prepared for any kind of land exchange, the founding of the state as a so-called "Little Thuringian Solution" was taken forward.

In the course of the foundation discussions, the state governments of Saxe-Meiningen and Coburg voiced misgivings as to whether joining the new state would be advantageous for them. On 30 November 1919, a plebiscite was held in Coburg in which the majority of the people voted against being merged into the state of Thuringia and hence for joining Bavaria. The misgivings of Saxe-Meiningen were resolved in part by a "guarantee of existence" (Bestandsgarantie) for Sonneberg and for the counties.

On 1 May 1920 the Free State of Thuringia was founded with its capital at Weimar. It did not include the Free State of Coburg, which was united with the Free State of Bavaria on 1 July 1920.

The region of the pre-2009 Evangelical-Lutheran Church in Thuringia corresponded, apart from a few small Prussian enclaves, to the boundaries of the State of Thuringia in 1920. Only the exclave of Ostheim, which used to belong to Saxe-Weimar-Eisenach, went to the Evangelical-Lutheran Church in Bavaria in 1972, in line with the political situation of the time.

== See also ==
- History of Thuringia
