= State of Thuringia (1920–1952) =

State in Germany

State of Thuringia Land Thüringen
- State of the Weimar Republic, Nazi Germany and East Germany
- Flag Coat of arms

- The State of Thuringia within the Weimar Republic
- Capital: Weimar (1920–1948); Erfurt (1948–1952)
- Demonym: Thuringian
- Area
  - Coordinates: 50°58′52″N 11°19′46″E
  - 1925: 11,763 km^{2} (4,542 sq mi)
- Population
  - 1925: 1,607,339
- Government
  - Type: Republic
- Minister-President
  - 1920–1921 (first): Arnold Paulssen
  - 1933 (last): Willy Marschler
- Reichsstatthalter
  - 1933–1945: Fritz Sauckel
- Legislature: Landtag
- Historical era: Interwar
  - Established: 1920
  - Constitution enacted: 26 October 1920
  - Abolition (de facto): 7 April 1933
Preceded by
Reuss
Saxe-Altenburg
Saxe-Gotha
Saxe-Meiningen
Saxe-Weimar-Eisenach
Schwarzburg-Rudolstadt
Schwarzburg-Sondershausen
Succeeded by
East Germany
- Today part of: Germany

The State of Thuringia (German: Land Thüringen, [lant ˈtyːʁɪŋən]) was a state of the Weimar Republic from 1920 to 1933, of Nazi Germany from 1933 to 1945 and of East Germany from 1949 to 1952. Following German reunification, the renamed Free State of Thuringia became a member state of the Federal Republic of Germany in 1990.

The State of Thuringia formed in the aftermath of World War I and the German revolution of 1918–1919. The eight small Thuringian states that had been part of the German Empire drove out their ruling royal houses and adopted republican constitutions in 1918–1919. On 1 May 1920, all except Coburg, which chose to become part of Bavaria, combined to create the State of Thuringia within the Weimar Republic.

From the beginning, Thuringia's Landtag (state assembly) was politically fractured, leading to a series of short-lived, unstable governments. When the Communist Party was brought into a coalition in 1923, the German government sent troops into Thuringia's major cities to force the communist ministers to withdraw. In 1929 Thuringia became the first German state to have members of the Nazi Party in its government. The year they were in office is seen as Adolf Hitler's trial run for his rise to power. The Nazis gained full control of the Thuringian government in August 1932, five months before Hitler became chancellor of Germany.

After World War II, Thuringia became part of the Soviet Occupation Zone and then of East Germany. It was enlarged by the addition of the Erfurt district, which had been part of Prussia, and in 1948 Erfurt replaced Weimar as the state's capital. In 1952, Thuringia was split into three regional districts and formally dissolved by the East German government in 1958.

== Historical background ==
The majority of the territory that became the Weimar Republic in 1918 had been part of the highly fragmented Holy Roman Empire (800–1806). At the outbreak of the Napoleonic Wars of 1803–1815, the Empire was made up of over 300 individual states. The consolidations under Napoleon that set the stage for the post-war establishment of the 39-state German Confederation (1815–1866) largely bypassed the Thuringian region, as did the changes that brought about the North German Confederation (1866–1871) with its 22 member states, and the German Empire with 25.

Thuringia's splintered political makeup dates back to at least the 15th century and involved three noble houses, the Wettins, Reusses and Schwarzburgs. In the Treaty of Leipzig (1485), Albert and Ernest, the two sons of the Saxon Elector Frederick II, divided the territory belonging to the House of Wettin between themselves. The Albertine lands remained largely intact and eventually became the Kingdom of Saxony, while the territory Ernest received branched into numerous small duchies as inheritances were split over a period of many generations. After the Saxe-Gotha-Altenburg line died out in 1825, the six extant Ernestine duchies were reorganized under an arbitration ruling by King Frederick Augustus I of Saxony. It created the four duchies of Saxe-Coburg and Gotha, Saxe-Altenburg, Saxe-Meiningen and Saxe-Weimar-Eisenach.

The House of Reuss can be traced back to the early 14th century. In 1586 it divided its possessions into the Elder (Lower Greiz), Middle (Upper Greiz) and Junior Lines (Gera). The Middle Line died out in 1616; the other two, after periods of splitting and recombining, became principalities in 1778 (Elder Line) and 1848 (Junior Line).

Into the 15th century, the part of the Schwarzburg lands that became Schwarzburg-Rudolstadt was held by the Albertine line of the House of Wettin and the part that became Schwarzburg-Sondershausen by the Ernestine line. After Saxon sovereignty over the area ended, the head of the Sondershausen branch was elevated to the rank of imperial prince in 1697; Rudolstadt followed in 1710.

All of the Thuringian states became members of the North German Confederation in 1866 and were constitutional monarchies in the German Empire (1871–1918). Their parliaments were single-chamber Landtags and had franchises that were more restrictive than that of the German Empire's Reichstag, which gave the vote to all men over the age of 25 with the exception of active members of the military and recipients of poor relief. In some but not all of the Thuringian states, voting was limited to men who paid direct taxes. Some also used indirect elections, in which the voters chose electors who then voted for the individual candidates. The most distinctive feature of Thuringian voting rights under the Empire was that all of their Landtags were composed of some combination of members appointed by the monarch, elected by the men who paid the highest taxes (or by manorial lords and the largest landowners), by cities, rural districts and/or clergy, and by members elected by the remainder of the eligible populace. In Schwarzburg-Sondershausen, for example, six members were appointed for life by the prince, six were elected by the male taxpayers who paid the most in taxes and six by the rest of the eligible voters.

== German revolution and the free states ==
The Thuringian states in 1910

In the final days of World War I, when it became clear that Germany was facing defeat, the revolution of 1918–1919 broke out and brought down the German Empire and all of Germany's royal houses. The revolution began in late October 1918 when rebellious sailors at Kiel set up a workers' and soldiers' council and in early November spread the revolt across the rest of Germany. Emperor Wilhelm II fled to Holland on 10 November, and councils quickly took power from the existing military, royal and civil authorities with little resistance or bloodshed.

The revolution followed the same pattern when it reached the Thuringian states on 8 November. Workers' and soldiers' councils took control in all seven states, and by 23 November the last of the ruling monarchs (Prince Günther Victor, for Schwarzburg-Sondershausen) had abdicated. The revolution in the Thuringian states unfolded for the most part without violence and often within the framework of the states' existing constitutions. Typical of the sequence of events is the Free State of Saxe-Altenburg, where a workers' and soldiers' council took control on 9 November. Four days later, Duke Ernst II abdicated under pressure from both the council in Altenburg and the events in Germany as a whole. The state ministry (government) was then expanded to include a representative of the moderate left Social Democratic Party (SPD), and it scheduled an election for a new Landtag (state parliament) under universal and equal voting rights. The SPD won an absolute majority of the seats, and the Landtag went on to pass an interim republican constitution for the new Free State of Saxe-Altenburg in April 1919. The following month it ratified the preliminary agreement on the unification of the Thuringian states that it had helped work out with the other states, and on 1 May 1920 Saxe-Altenburg ceased to exist when it became part of the new State of Thuringia.

In Saxe-Coburg and Gotha, the revolution led to the Duchy breaking apart. In the Coburg region, the revolution played out quietly, much as it did in Saxe-Altenburg and the other Thuringian states, but in Gotha events were more turbulent. It was the only region within the Thuringian states where the radical left Independent Social Democratic Party (USPD) won a majority of the seats when it elected a new Landtag. The USPD favored the establishment of a council (soviet) republic, whereas the SPD, which dominated in Coburg, wanted a parliamentary republic. The election campaign in Gotha was overshadowed by the occupation of the city by Freikorps units that supported the SPD-led government in Berlin. They were sent in to disarm workers in Gotha who were seen as a potential threat to the Weimar National Assembly, which was meeting nearby. The occupation led to eight days of street fighting between the Freikorps and workers before the troops withdrew.

In spite of the USPD's dominance, Gotha's Landtag rejected a draft constitution that established a council republic and instead opted for a parliamentary republic. During the right-wing Kapp Putsch in Berlin in March 1920, striking workers in Gotha armed themselves and set up a 40-member executive council (Vollzugsrat). The government sent a Reichswehr unit to the city and serious clashes broke out, with 127 deaths counted before the fighting ended on 19 March. On 10 April the Berlin government implemented a Reichsexekution against Saxe-Gotha to resolve its government crisis. A state of emergency was imposed, a Reich commissioner took control in the Free State, the Landtag was dissolved and a new election held in which the USPD, although still the largest party, lost its absolute majority.

Gotha went on to become part of the new state of Thuringia when it was formed on 1 May 1920. In Coburg, the people voted in a referendum against joining Thuringia and instead merged into Bavaria on 1 July 1920.

The two former Reuss principalities merged into the People's State of Reuss in April 1919 before joining Thuringia in 1920.

== Founding ==
Calls to consolidate the numerous small monarchies of the Thuringian region and create a unified state began at least as far back as the Revolution of 1848. Many saw advantages in a larger economic and administrative community, along with the potential for improvements in the small states' financial situations. No substantive progress was made, however, until after the end of World War I and the fall of the German Empire. Representatives of Thuringia's workers' and soldiers' councils, the states and industrial trade associations met in Erfurt (then part of Prussia) on 10 December 1918. They voted to work towards the establishment of a 'greater' Thuringia that would include not only the eight small states of the former Empire but also the Thuringian areas of Prussia such as the Erfurt region. Few additional steps were taken in the short term amid the post-war problems of food shortages, political unrest and, crucially, the question of whether the successor state to the Empire would be federal or unitary.

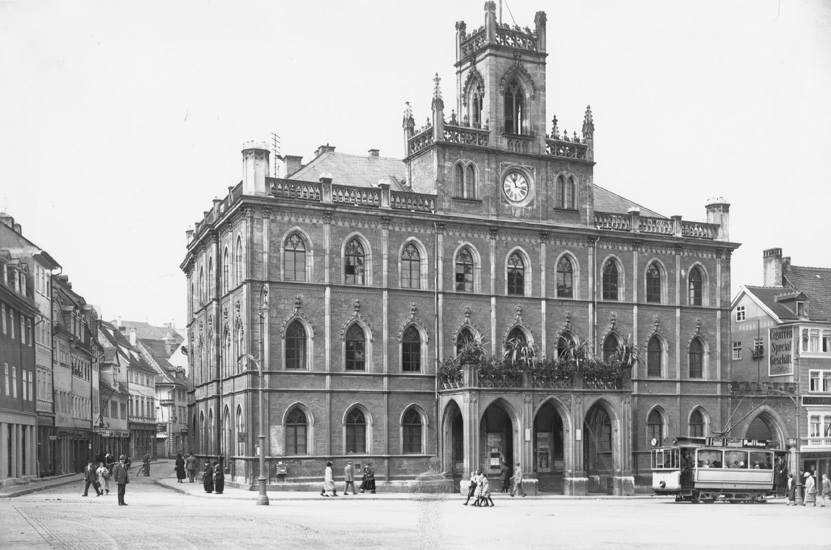
Weimar's City Hall in 1925

In late March 1919, when it had become clear that the new Germany would remain federally structured and after all of the Thuringian states had elected parliaments, their representatives met in Weimar to begin discussing plans to form a unified state that would include the Thuringian regions of Prussia. On 29 April, Reuss's leading minister, Carl von Brandenstein, presented a draft “Community Agreement on the Merger of the Thuringian States” (the Gemeinschaftsvertrag). It proposed establishing a 12-member State Council (Staatsrat) made up of representatives of the states and a 42-member People's Council (Volksrat) to be elected by the state parliaments. The State Council, acting as Thuringia's transitional government, met for the first time on 14 July 1919 in Weimar under the leadership of Saxe-Weimar-Eisenach's state minister Arnold Paulssen of the liberal German Democratic Party (DDP).

Discussions with Prussia regarding Erfurt and other Thuringian regions within Prussia failed due to its resistance to ceding any of its territory and to the desire of the majority of the regions' residents to remain in Prussia. In a referendum held on 30 November 1919, voters in Coburg chose not to join the new Thuringia, clearing the way for it to become part of Bavaria. The slightly reduced Thuringian People's Council met in mid-December, and the Community Agreement officially came into force on 4 January 1920. It marked the abandonment of the hopes for a 'greater Thuringia'. The 'lesser' Thuringia they had to accept included numerous exclaves that were surrounded by Prussia, Saxony or Bavaria, and a number of enclaves within it that belonged to either Prussia or Saxony.

The final step towards official statehood, the "Law Concerning the State of Thuringia", was passed by both houses of the Weimar Republic's parliament and became effective on 1 May 1920. In creating the State of Thuringia, the law required that it elect a state assembly within five months. The existing People's Council was to adopt a constitution; until the new assembly and state government were in place, the provisions of the Community Agreement were to remain in force.

The People's Council adopted a provisional constitution on 12 May 1920 and dissolved itself on 11 June. The election for the first Thuringian Landtag (state assembly) on 20 June drew 82% of eligible voters (all men and women over 20 years old who had full civic rights). The results splintered among six parties. The far left Independent Social Democrats (USPD) won the most seats (15 of 53), followed by the national-conservative Thuringian Agricultural League (11 seats) and the moderate left Social Democratic Party (SPD), also with 11 seats. The new Landtag met for the first time on 20 July in Thuringia's capital, Weimar.

=== Constitution ===
The Thuringian constitution was modeled on the interim constitution of the Free State of Saxe-Weimar-Eisenach written by Eduard Rosenthal and was adopted by the Landtag on 11 March 1921. It established a single-chamber parliament (the Landtag) with three-year terms of office. All residents of the state (both women and men) above the age of 20 were eligible to vote. The Landtag was responsible for passing laws, supervising the administration and electing from among its ranks the members of the government ministry, which was dependent on its confidence. If a former Thuringian state was not represented in the state ministry, a state councilor (minister without portfolio) with full ministerial rights was chosen to represent its interests in the government. The ministers elected a president from among their number to lead the ministry. It could introduce laws and veto any passed by the Landtag; if the Landtag passed it again, it could call for a popular referendum on the matter. The ministry could also pass emergency laws as long as they did not violate the constitution. The constitution included a section of transitional regulations and established a state court at Jena. The state's official name was "State of Thuringia" (Land Thüringen).

== Unstable governments and federal intervention ==
The splintered results of the 1920 election made it impossible for the parties to form a stable majority coalition. After a motion by the USPD to dissolve the Landtag failed and four of its members left to join the Communist Party (KPD), the SPD and DDP formed a minority government on 10 November – almost four months after the election – that the USPD agreed to tolerate. Arnold Paulssen of the DDP became minister-president. He formed a cabinet made up of members of the DDP, SPD and independents.

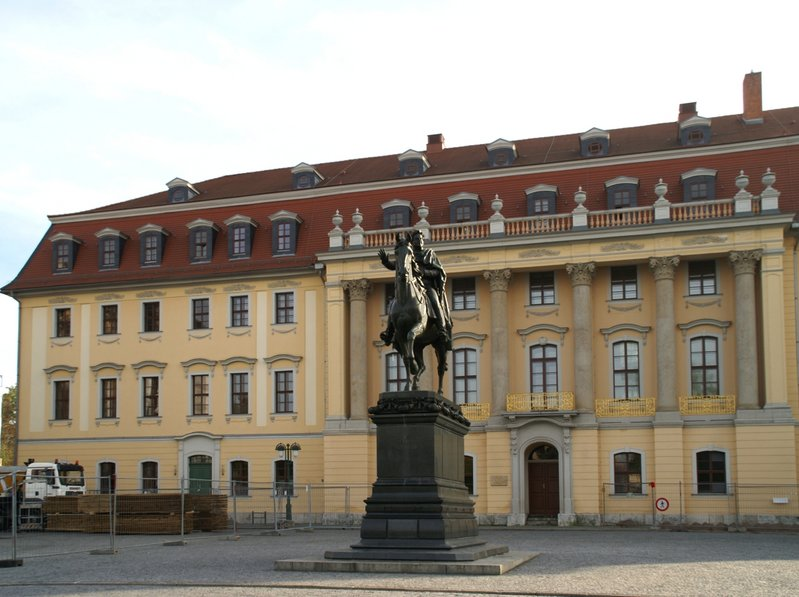
The former Thuringian Landtag building in Weimar

Paulssen's government fell after barely six months in office. At the end of July 1921, the Landtag voted to dissolve itself, and an early election was scheduled for 7 October. It altered the fragmented makeup of the Landtag very little; the most significant change was the loss of six USPD seats to the KPD. The new government under August Frölich (SPD) was a coalition of the SPD and USPD that was tolerated by the KPD. It worked to reorganize the counties (Kreise) and municipalities of the newly formed state and to modernize the civil service and the school and university systems. After the assassination of German Foreign Minister Walther Rathenau by right-wing extremists in June 1922, Thuringia banned the National Socialist (Nazi) Party and other far-right organizations. The reform efforts of Frölich's government met strong opposition from the political right, including the Bildungsbürgertum (educated middle class), the majority of liberal arts professors at the University of Jena and opponents of the modernist Bauhaus design movement which had been founded at Weimar in 1919.

In September 1922, the USPD merged into the SPD at the national level. The middle-class parties in the Thuringian Landtag, supported by the KPD, submitted a vote of no confidence against Frölich's now SPD-only minority ministry in August 1923. A month later, the ministry resigned but remained in office while Frölich conducted coalition discussions with the KPD. The two parties reached an agreement, and on 16 October Frölich formed a majority government with five SPD and three KPD ministers. The government's program included strengthening republican defense forces (the Proletarian Hundreds) to defend against potential right-wing threats from Bavaria.

The entry of the Communist Party into Thuringia's government came six days after a similar cabinet change in Saxony, Thuringia's neighbor to the east. The moves aroused fears in the German government that a left-wing coup in the region was imminent. In response, Reichswehr troops were sent into both Saxony and Thuringia. When the Saxon minister-president refused to remove the KPD members from his government, Berlin invoked Article 48 of the Weimar Constitution to use a Reichsexekution, a formal federal intervention against a rebellious state, to remove the Saxon government. On 6 November it withdrew executive power from the Frölich ministry, and government troops occupied Thuringia's major cities over the following two days. Frölich bowed to the pressure and convinced his KPD ministers to resign on 12 November, thus removing the threat of a formal Reichsexekution. The Landtag dissolved itself on 14 December, and an election was scheduled for 10 February 1924.

Without the knowledge of the leaders of Saxony and Thuringia or of the federal authorities in Berlin, the Communist International in Moscow had made plans to use the KPD's entry into the two state governments as a signal for a nationwide communist uprising, the so-called German October. They significantly overestimated the revolutionary mood among German workers, however, and the attempt was called off.

== 1924 Landtag election ==
The February 1924 Landtag election caused a major shift in the direction of Thuringian politics. It took place under the ongoing state of emergency that Berlin had imposed the preceding fall. Parties of the center and right – the German Democratic Party (DDP), German People's Party (DVP), German National People's Party (DNVP), Thuringian Agricultural League and several smaller parties – came together as the League of Order (Ordnungsbund) in an attempt to improve their chances of ousting the Frölich government. They fell just short of a majority, winning 48% of the vote against 41.5% for the SPD and KPD. The extreme right-wing United Völkisch List (Vereinigte völkische Liste), which included members of the banned National Socialist Party, took 9% of the vote.

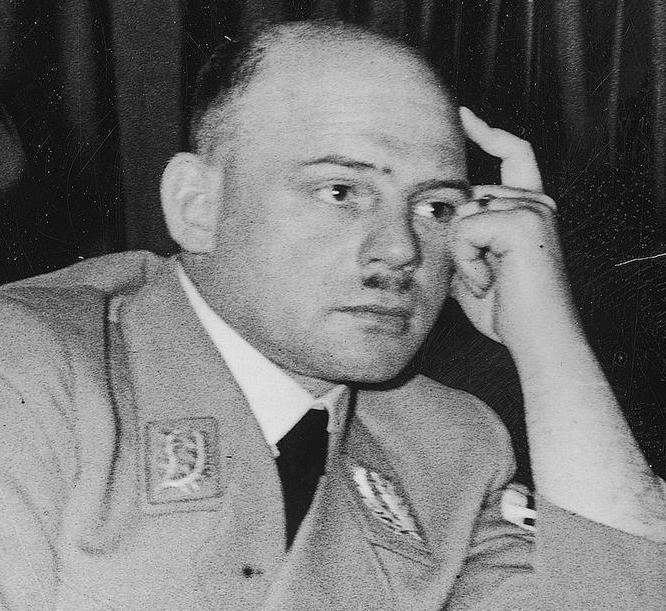
Fritz Sauckel (shown here in 1937), was Thuringia's first Nazi Gauleiter. He later became minister-president (1932–1933) and was Reichsstatthalter (governor) from 1933 to 1945.

The Ordnungsbund formed a new government with the toleration of the Völkisch List. Its lead minister, Richard Leutheusser of the DVP, formed a cabinet consisting of members from the DVP and DNVP only. The DDP chose not to join the ministry because of the Völkisch List's toleration. The government immediately set about reversing many of Frölich's reforms. Social democrats and pro-republic officials were released from the civil service, and the Bauhaus school was forced out of Weimar. When Leutheusser could not get the cooperation of the Landtag, he made extensive use of emergency orders, which were allowed, with conditions, under the constitution.

One of the Ordnungsbund's first actions was to lift the ban on the National Socialists. The Gau (Nazi administrative region) of Thuringia was formed in March 1925 under the leadership of Artur Dinter and Fritz Sauckel. Even though the Weimar Republic had prohibited Adolf Hitler from speaking in public, Thuringia allowed him to hold open rallies beginning in the autumn of 1925. Thuringia became such a favorable field of activity for the National Socialists that they chose Weimar for its first Reich Party Congress (July 1926) after it was re-founded following Hitler's release from prison in December 1924.

The 1927 election – Thuringia's only Landtag election during the Weimar era that was not held early following the dissolution of the Landtag – marked the end of the Ordnungsbund. A reduced "unity list" of the DVP, DNVP and Agricultural League won 34% of the vote, down 12% from the Ordnungsbund's 48% three years earlier. The SPD was the second largest party with 32% of the vote; the National Socialist Party, running under its own name, took two seats. The government remained initially under Richard Leutheusser, followed by two changes of lead minister before the Landtag dissolved itself in 1929. The majority of the ministerial posts were held by the DVP, DDP, Agricultural League and Economic Party.

== Rise of the National Socialists: Thuringia as Hitler's trial run ==
In the December 1929 election, the DVP, DNVP, DDP and KPD all lost seats. The SPD regained its place as the strongest party, with the Agricultural League and the National Socialists coming in second and third. Since the parties of the middle and moderate right, with 23 of 53 seats, refused to form a coalition with the SPD, they had no choice but to turn to the Nazi Party, which had 6 mandates. Adolf Hitler personally took part in the coalition discussions and argued successfully for the Nazis to be given the two ministries that he considered to be the most important: interior and education. Wilhelm Frick was chosen to head both, and the new government led by Erwin Baum of the Agricultural League became the first in the Weimar Republic to include National Socialists.

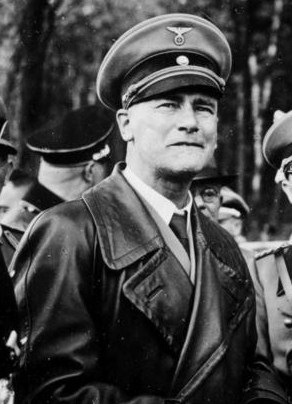
Wilhelm Frick in 1938. He was the Nazi Party minister of the interior and education in Thuringia in 1930.

In March, Frick introduced an enabling act that the Landtag passed by a vote of 28 to 25. It gave the government extensive powers to reorganize state institutions independently of the legislature. In addition to banning left-leaning newspapers and Erich Maria Remarque's anti-war novel All Quiet on the Western Front, Frick removed social democratic and republican officials from the state administration and the police force. He required the use of a National Socialist school prayer that included the Nazi slogan "Germany, awake!" (Deutschland, erwache!) and established a faculty of racial studies at the University of Jena. In response to the school prayer dictate, German interior secretary Joseph Wirth brought charges against Thuringia in the State Court for the German Reich, Germany's constitutional court.

Initially the other parties in the Baum coalition went along with the Nazi's policies out of fear that opposing them would rupture the coalition and benefit the parties of the Left. During the period that the Nazi Party was in the government, Hitler spoke at 14 rallies in Thuringia, and membership of both the SA (Sturmabteilung) and the Nazi Party doubled. In the end Frick's tenure lasted barely over a year. He stepped down on 1 April 1931 after the Landtag passed a motion of no confidence against him. The National Socialist state councilor for Weimar resigned at the same time. Both he and Frick were replaced by members of the Agricultural League.

Historian Alexander Gallus wrote that Thuringia played a key part in Hitler's rise to power:

From the start of his participation in government, Hitler had prepared a master plan for the restructuring of Thuringia – the state became a test case for the rise of the National Socialists. ... Even though the NSDAP's first participation in government at the state level ended prematurely, the party gained important insights such as how to enter and dominate a coalition with middle-right parties and use an enabling act to bypass parliament.

== End of the republican state ==
The Nazis took 42.5% of the vote in the 31 July 1932 election and became the largest party in the Thuringian Landtag. The SDP came in second with 24.3%, followed by the KPD with 16.1% and the Agricultural League with 8.4%. The new government under lead minister Fritz Sauckel of the NSDAP had one minister from the Agricultural League; the rest were from the Nazi Party. The Sauckel government made Thuringia one of just four states of the Weimar Republic to elect a Nazi Party government before Hitler became chancellor of Germany on 30 January 1933. The others were Anhalt, Oldenburg and Mecklenburg-Schwerin.

Thuringia's Landtag adjourned indefinitely on 14 February 1933. In the election for the national Reichstag held on 5 March 1933, 47.6% of Thuringians voted for the Nazi Party, 21.4% for the SPD, 15.3% for the KPD and 12.4% for the Battle Front Black-Red-White (Kampffront Schwarz-Weiss-Rot), an electoral alliance of the DNVP, Agricultural League and the paramilitary Stahlhelm. Immediately after the election, the first Synchronization (Gleichschaltung) Law reconstituted all state Landtags based on the 5 March Reichstag results. In Thuringia, the law gave 29 of 60 seats to the Nazis, with 13, 10 and 8 seats going to the SPD, KPD and Battle Front respectively. The Landtag met on 1 May 1933 and elected an all-Nazi ministry headed by Willy Marschler. On 16 May it passed an enabling act which gave the Marschler ministry the power to enact legislation without the Landtag. The only no votes came from the 11 SPD members who were present; the KPD had already been banned and was not permitted to vote. The Landtag was officially disbanded on 14 October 1933.

== Landtag election results ==
	1920	1921	1924	1927	1929	1932	1933
Social Democratic Party (SPD)	11	13	17	18	18	15	13
Independent Social Democratic Party (USPD)	15	9	–	.	.	.	.
Thuringian Agricultural League	11	10			9	6	.
Economic Party (WP)	.	–		5	6	–	.
People's Justice Party (VRP)	.	.	.	1	–	.	.
German National People's Party (DNVP)	4	4	35 (Note: League of Order (see 1924 Landtag election, below))	19 (Note: Unity List)	2	2	8
German People's Party (DVP)	8	9	35	19	5	1	–
German Democratic Party (DDP)	4	3	35	2	1	1	–
Communist Party (KPD)	–	6	13	8	6	10	[10] (Note: Prohibited from voting)
Nazi Party (NSDAP)	.	.	7	2	6	26	29
German Völkisch Freedom Party (DFVP)	.	.	7	1	.	.	.
Total seats	53	54	72	56	53	61	[60]
source: State of Thuringia. Landtag Elections 1920–1933

== Territorial changes ==
In 1928 an exchange of territory took place between Thuringia and Saxony. Thuringia gained a Saxon exclave within its territory, and a Thuringian exclave within Saxony went to Saxony. The exchange affected a total of about 7,800 people.

On 1 April 1944, the Landkreis Herrschaft Schmalkalden, which belonged to the Prussian Province of Hesse-Nassau, was reorganized into the administrative district of Erfurt in the Prussian Province of Saxony. On the same day, a second order divided the province of Saxony into the Province of Magdeburg and the Province of Halle-Merseburg, and incorporated the district of Erfurt into the State of Thuringia. The administrative district was placed under the control of the Reich Governor in Thuringia in his capacity as Oberpräsident. Constitutional law did not change the administrative district's affiliation to Prussia. The eighth star in the current coat of arms of Thuringia, a lion on a blue background, symbolizes the Prussian territories, which were legally annexed at the end of 1945.

== Soviet occupation and German Democratic Republic ==
At the end of March 1945, as the Western armies approached Thuringia, Nazi officers ordered Thuringia to be defended to the last man. The fighting on 1 April between Treffurt and Gerstungen, in which Volkssturm, Hitler Youth and front-line soldiers opposed the advancing US troops, claimed about 350 lives and destroyed approximately 85% of the small town of Creuzburg. Within two weeks, the entire state was occupied by American troops.

On 6 April, there had been heavy bombing raids on Gera.

Thuringia in the German Democratic Republic.

Under the terms of the Allied Agreements of Yalta, the state of Thuringia was occupied by Soviet troops between 2 and 6 July 1945 and became part of the Soviet Occupation Zone. Thuringia was enlarged to 15,585 km^{2} by the addition of the former Prussian Erfurt administrative district. The Thuringian exclave of Ostheim vor der Rhön was incorporated into Bavaria in 1945 by order of the American military government.

The Thuringian State Parliament was elected in 1946 in semi-free state elections. Thuringia received a new constitution on 20 December 1946, and in 1948 the capital was moved from Weimar to Erfurt. After the establishment of the German Democratic Republic (East Germany) in 1949, political parties were brought into line with bloc parties, and the state parliament was elected in non-free elections according to unity lists. With the reorganization of East Germany into districts (Bezirke) in July 1952, the state of Thuringia transferred its administrative functions to three new districts, Erfurt, Gera and Suhl. In December 1958, the state of Thuringia was formally dissolved.

The state presidents of Thuringia (from 1947 prime ministers) were:

- Hermann Brill (SPD, June to July 1945, under American occupation)
- Rudolf Paul (DDP/SED, 1945–1947, fled to the West)
- Werner Eggerath (KPD/SED, 1947–1952)

== See also ==
- Thuringian Landtag elections in the Weimar Republic
- Flag of Thuringia
- Coat of Arms of Thuringia

== Literature ==
- Joachim Bergmann: The domestic political development of Thuringia from 1918 to 1932 (= Culture and History of Thuringia, Volume 16). Europaforum-Verlag, Lauf a.d.Pegnitz 2001, ISBN 3-931070-27-1.
- Christian Faludi, Marc Bartuschka (ed.): "Closer Homeland". The founding of the state of Thuringia in 1920. Weimarer Verlagsgesellschaft / Verlagshaus Römerweg, Wiesbaden 2020, ISBN 978-3-7374-0281-1.
