= People's State of Reuss =

German state (1919–1920)

Coordinates: 50°52′50″N 12°05′00″E

People's State of Reuss Volksstaat Reuß (German)
- 1919–1920
- Flag Coat of arms

- Thuringia within the Weimar Republic

- People's State of Reuss (in dark and light pink) within Thuringia
- Capital: Gera
- Government: Republic
- Historical era: Interwar period
  - Established: 4 April 1919
  - Merged into Thuringia: 1 May 1920

Area
- 1919: 1,143 km^{2} (441 sq mi)

Population
  - 1919: 211,324
Preceded by	Succeeded by
Principality of Reuss-Greiz; Principality of Reuss-Gera	Thuringia
- Today part of: Germany

The People's State of Reuss (German: Volksstaat Reuß) was a small, short-lived (1919–1920) central German state during the early years of the Weimar Republic. It was formed following the dissolution of the principalities of Reuss-Gera and Reuss-Greiz during the German revolution of 1918–1919. After Prince Heinrich XXVII abdicated for both principalities, they joined to form the People's State of Reuss. It became part of the new state of Thuringia when it was created on 1 May 1920.

== Predecessor states ==
The People's State of Reuss was formed from the merger of two former principalities of the House of Reuss: Reuss-Greiz (also known as Reuss Elder Line) and Reuss-Gera (the Junior Line). Both had been member states of the German Empire from 1871 until its fall in 1918 at the end of World War I. Due to the incapacity of Prince Heinrich XXIV of Reuss-Greiz, the two principalities were ruled in a personal union by Prince Heinrich XXVII of the Junior Line from 1908 to 1918. Each principality had one seat in the Empire's Reichstag and one in the Bundesrat.

== Revolution of 1918 ==
The two principalities collapsed during the revolution of 1918–1919, which brought down the German Empire and all of Germany's royal houses at the end of World War I. The revolution began in late October 1918 when rebellious sailors at Kiel set up a workers' and soldiers' council and in early November spread the revolt across the rest of Germany. Emperor Wilhelm II fled to Holland on 10 November, and councils quickly took power from the existing military, royal and civil authorities with little resistance or bloodshed.

The revolution reached the Reuss principalities on 10 November. At Gera, a workers' and soldiers' council was formed following a public assembly that had demanded Prince Heinrich's abdication and the resignation of his ministers and of the mayor of Gera. Shortly afterwards, the Prince formally abdicated for both principalities. A demonstration at Greiz the same day also called for Heinrich to abdicate and for the principality to become a socialist republic. A workers' and soldiers' council was set up the next day, and the Prince's abdication was announced.

== Elections and the Kapp Putsch ==
The principalities set up separate transitional governments under the leadership of their respective workers' and soldiers' councils. Reuss-Gera's state minister was the independent Karl Freiherr von Brandenstein and Reuss-Greitz's was William Oberländer of the liberal German Democratic Party (DDP). Each government had a single state councilor (Staatsrat) from the radical left Independent Social Democratic Party (USPD). An administrative union of the two states was formed on 21 December 1918.

On 2 February 1919 both states held elections for their still separate state parliaments (Landtag in the singular). In Reuss-Gera, a combined list of the USPD and the moderate Social Democratic Party (SPD) won 62% of the vote; in Greitz 45% went to the USPD and 16% to the SPD. Two months later, on 4 April, the combined Landtags passed the "Law on the Unification of the Two Free States of Reuss into One People's State of Reuss and on the Provisional Constitution and Administration". Brandenstein and Oberländer became joint state ministers of the new government. All of the state councilors were from the USPD. The capital was Gera.

During the March 1920 Kapp Putsch, a right-wing attempt to overthrow the government of the Weimar Republic, about 1,500 Freikorps and volunteer troops sympathetic to the putschists occupied Gera's town hall and other key buildings. A strike was called in protest, and on the 15th a demonstration led to a street battle in which two soldiers and 15 protesters were killed. At the end of eight hours of fighting, the putschists had been disarmed and the city retaken.

Another violent clash took place near the Reuss village of Naitschau on 21 March, when a hastily mustered workers' militia confronted two Reichswehr battalions marching towards Leipzig to help put down a workers' uprising there. The militia succeeded in stopping the Reichswehr units at a total cost of 13 to 15 lives.

== Transition to the State of Thuringia ==
In late March 1919, representatives of the eight Thuringian states had met in Weimar to begin discussing plans to form a unified state. All except Coburg signed the “Community Agreement on the Merger of the Thuringian States” on 4 January 1920. Both houses of the Weimar Republic's parliament subsequently passed a federal law officially creating the State of Thuringia. When the law became effective on 1 May 1920, the People's State of Reuss formally ceased to exist as a sovereign federal state. The Reuss region continued to exist as a higher-level municipal association with its own state government and state assembly until March 1923. Over that period its powers were gradually transferred to the state. In addition, for the first 15 years after the Thuringian state constitution of 1921 came into force, one member of the state government had to come from Reuss.
