= Götz Kubitschek =

German journalist (born 1970)

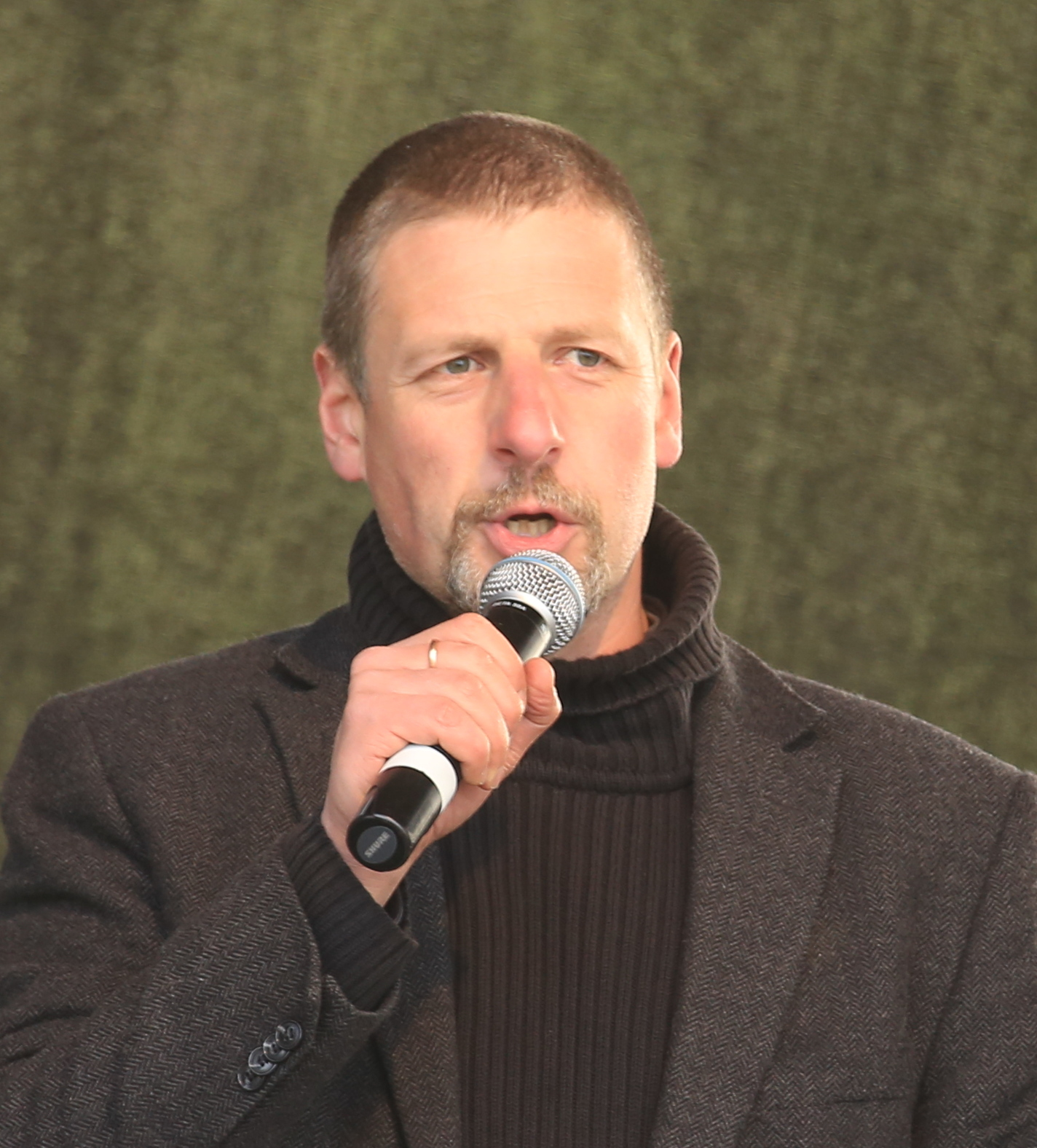
- Kubitschek at a PEGIDA rally in April 2015
- Born: 17 August 1970 (age 56); Ravensburg, Baden-Württemberg, West Germany
- Occupations: Publisher, journalist, political activist

Götz Kubitschek (German pronunciation: [gœt͡s 'kuːbit͡ʃɛk]; born 17 August 1970) is a German publisher, journalist and political activist. He espouses ethnocentric positions and is one of the most important protagonists of the Neue Rechte (New Right) in Germany. Hailing from the staff of right-wing newspaper Junge Freiheit, Kubitschek is one of the founders of the Neue Rechte think tank Institut für Staatspolitik (Institute for State Policy; IfS). Since 2002, he is the manager of his self-founded publishing house Antaios, since 2003 chief editor of the journal Sezession, as well as editor of the corresponding blog Sezession im Netz.

He initiated several small-scale rightist political campaigns like the Konservativ-Subversive Aktion (KSA) and Ein Prozent für unser Land (One Percent For Our Country). According to observers, he was also instrumental in the conceptual consolidation of the German branch of the Identitarian movement, commonly viewed as far-right. In 2015, he appeared several times as the main speaker at rallies of the anti-Islamic PEGIDA movement in the German state of Saxony. Furthermore, he is in contact with East German members of the right-wing populist Alternative for Germany (AfD) party.

== Personal life and early activities ==
Kubitschek was born in Ravensburg (German town in Baden-Württemberg). After leaving school in 1990 with Abitur, he did his military service with a reconnaissance unit in nearby Weingarten. From 1992 to 1999, he studied in Hanover and Heidelberg to become a teacher in German, geography and philosophy, recording a CD with Goethe poems and songs during this time. Kubitschek joined the Deutsche Gildenschaft, a völkisch-oriented association of student fraternities, like his later colleagues Dieter Stein (founder of the newspaper Junge Freiheit) and Karlheinz Weißmann. He was the Gildenschaft's vice-president and spokesman for its active members. As of 2003, he states to have resigned from his membership.

=== Editor of Junge Freiheit ===
In 1993, he was speaker at a Junge Freiheit summer school in Ravensburg, headed by the far-right publisher Hans-Ulrich Kopp and organised clandestinely by a FPÖ university students' association among others. His talk was about the Weimar-era national-revolutionary writer and right-wing activist Ernst von Salomon. In early 1995, he was responsible for a special edition of Junge Freiheit about the writer Ernst Jünger, viewed by some as a mental precursor of the New Right. From June 1995 to January 1997, he was the JF's editor for security and military matters. He stayed close to the newspaper afterwards, writing many articles for JF's front page and cooperating with chief editor Stein for a special publication for JF's 20th anniversary in 2006.

In 1996, Kubitschek, as part of an organisation founded by himself, participated in protests against the Hamburg Institute for Social Research's exhibition about the war crimes of the German Wehrmacht. In 2010, he took part in a memorial march for the victims of the Allied bombing of Dresden, dominated by neo-Nazis.

=== Deployment Abroad ===
From December 1997 to March 1998, Kubitschek, a reserve officer in the Army, served voluntarily with the Bundeswehr as part of SFOR in Bosnia. He was stationed in Sarajevo as second lieutenant and led a platoon in "Operative Communications". After Ernst Jünger died in February 1998, he organised a reading of his works. Having returned to Germany, he published a book about his experiences in Bosnia together with a first lieutenant who was classified as a right-wing extremist by military intelligence.

=== Family ===
Kubitschek is married to Ellen Kositza, his second wife, who also wrote for the JF. The couple has seven children and lives in Schnellroda Manor in the village of Steigra (Saxony-Anhalt).

== Founding political platforms ==
In 2000, Kubitschek and the gymnasium teacher Karlheinz Weißmann, another main protagonist of the Neue Rechte, founded the Institut für Staatspolitik (IfS; Institute for State Policy) to promote neo-rightist ideas and persons in material and non-material ways. Since 2003, the Institute publishes the bi-monthly journal 'Sezession', with Kubitschek as chief editor. Within the Neue Rechte, the institution competes with the firmly Neo-Nazi Deutsches Kolleg (German College) and the more Christian-conservative Studienzentrum Weikersheim (Weikersheim Centre of Studies).

The IfS's style was linked to the "fascist [rather cold] style" of Armin Mohler, a Swiss writer and publisher known for his work on the Conservative Revolution. Kubitschek and Weißmann made the laudatory speech for Mohler's 80th birthday in 2000, and he was among the signatories for Mohler's obituary by his "friends and students" after his death in 2003, also making one of the speeches at his funeral. He resigned from managing the IfS in September 2008 in favour of Erik Lehnert, a philosopher. Since 2002, he has been managing the Antaios publishing house linked to the IfS.

=== Conflict with the Bundeswehr ===
On 16 August 2001, one day before his 31st birthday, Kubitschek, by then reserve first lieutenant, was dismissed from a training exercise in progress as he was charged with being "involved in right-wing extremist endeavours" according to the Bundeswehr's Office of Personnel and as his "remaining in the Bundeswehr [would] seriously endanger military order and security among the troops." He had frequently written articles for Junge Freiheit which was at that time under observation by federal security agencies.

As a response, the JF started a campaign in September 2001, appealing to the Bundeswehr to revoke its decision and protesting against categorising their activity as right-wing extremist. The Bundeswehr repealed its decision in the first half of 2002. The communication historian Lutz Hachmeister claimed that this was not due to the JF's appeal but due to possible legal problems. Kubitschek received no further promotions. He commented in 2008: "To be a soldier, you don't have to wear epaulettes; to serve the state, you don't have to be a state [i.e. public] servant."

== Political position ==
=== Neo-rightist metapolitics ===
Kubitschek is seen as a spokesman for the Neue Rechte. While his companion Dieter Stein, the JF's chief editor, has rejected the label Neue Rechte (New Right) as impractical, Kubitschek has actively used the term. Whereas Stein is said to favour developing the JF along the lines of a pragmatic national-conservatism, Kubitschek is closer to traditionally metapolitical views, supported by his colleagues Martin Lichtmesz and Manfred Kleine-Hartlage. His former companion Weißmann criticised him politically and personally in 2015. Helmut Kellershohn sees in his thinking an overlap of Conservatism, the Conservative Revolution and Fascism. Kellershohn cites Filippo Marinetti, Gottfried Benn, Ernst Jünger and Primo de Rivera as influences.

=== Relationship with NPD ===
Members of the National Democratic Party (traditionally the most important of Germany's post-war far-right parties, usually categorised as neo-Nazi) accused him of indulging in "intellectual self-gratification" and that he was part of the "system". Kubitschek had spoken dismissively about the NPD and its aim to "overcome the system": "What I got to know here in my region [in Saxony-Anhalt state] regarding NPD structures or proto-political structures, like Kameradschaften etc. [i.e. loosely-organised neo-Nazi gangs], this is – with due respect – beneath contempt and does not live up to their self-imposed aspirations of advancing Germany. It starts with manners, continues with their political models and their dangerous semi-knowledge, and ends with their outline of how to organise things after taking power. This competition about who may frame the most radical solution and the most radical view, is alien to me." His and the NPD's overlap are "pretty small", he said. Kubitschek's activities were deemed by Endstation Rechts (a Young Social Democrat watchdog of the far-right) to be "non-extremist" in 2010, but explicitly without excluding historical revisionism.

Nonetheless, Kubitschek gave an interview in the NPD paper Deutsche Stimme (German Voice) in 2008. In a talk at IfS, he stressed: "The way our state is composed now, it can hardly be stabilised. In its foundations, there are many inclusions that are corrupting the Nation. And through its current policies, it is destroying the substance of the German people, which is without ifs or buts the foundation of a German future." Uwe Backes, a researcher of extremism, called the relationship with the NPD "elitist distance" in 2012. Likewise, Armin Pfahl-Traughber, another German scholar of extremism, said in 2008 that "the differences are less in their animosity towards the norms of the democratic constitutional state but more in regard to methods and target groups."

=== Relationship with AfD and German Republicans ===
Kubitschek said he worked for a short time in the early 2000s as an advisor for the Baden-Württemberg section of the Republicans, a German far-right fringe party. In 2005, he accepted an invitation to the summer convention of their youth chapter at Mainz-Kostheim where he gave a talk amongst other members of European rightist parties like the Austrian FPÖ and the Belgian Vlaams Belang.

Both Kubitschek and his wife applied for membership in the Saxony-Anhalt section of the newly formed AfD party (variously termed national-conservative or right-wing populist). This was approved on 27 January 2015 and their ID cards were issued on 5 February, but on 17 February, they were told by the party's federal secretary that their applications had been rejected.

Kubitschek responded positively to the Erfurt Resolution by party right-wingers and state-level party chairmen Björn Höcke (Thuringia) and André Poggenburg (Saxony-Anhalt) in March 2015, stating his support for this "neo-rightist [...] assembly movement" within the party. Poggenburg approved Kubitschek's joining and criticised its revocation by the federal party board around Bernd Lucke.

In November 2015, Kubitschek allowed Höcke to give a talk in Schnellroda that was available online for a short time and that was widely seen as racist. According to Pfahl-Traughber, Kubitschek is part of Höcke's "political friends", whose state party chapter facilitated "German-nationalist voices with clear orientations in a far-right direction."

After the AfD's huge success at the Saxony-Anhalt state elections in 2016, Kubitschek was a guest at their election night event and was quoted as saying: "I can assure you that these pragmatists, now represented with 27 members in the Saxony-Anhalt state parliament and with big groups in Rhineland-Palatinate and [Baden-] Württemberg, would very, very much like to adapt and politically realise some of the concepts, some of the topics, some of the expertise from our projects." In June 2016, he and his wife were guests at the so-called Kyffhäuser Meeting of the AfD's right wing around Höcke and Poggenburg.

== Initiatives and events ==
Researcher Volker Weiss claimed Kubitschek had been "always more an activist than an intellectual." According to the sociologist Alexander Häusler, he is "one of the authoritative actors of the action-oriented Right which tries to draw attention to right-wing politics with actions in the streets and provocations of völkisch content." He has been characterised as a "movement entrepreneur" and a "demagogue".

=== Conservative-Subversive Action ===
Kubitschek is known to adapt traditionally leftist strategies and terminology. In 2007, he initiated the Konservativ-Subversive Aktion with only a few companions, its name being reminiscent of the 1960s West German far-left group Subversive Aktion. Their tactics were aimed to spread its positions by offensive and spectacular actions. Well-publicised, provocant actions of KSA have been the disruption of a Berlin convention of a socialist students' association in May 2008; of a speech by Egon Krenz, a former GDR apparatchik, in June 2008; of a reading by Nobel Prize-winning writer Günter Grass in August 2008; of a discussion forum with Green politician Daniel 'Red Danny' Cohn-Bendit and moderate conservative Armin Laschet in November 2009; and a demonstration in black shirts against chancellor Merkel's participation in a memorial service for the end of World War I in France.

According to political scientist Gideon Botsch (2012), Kubitschek's fascination with the "activism and voluntarism of radical left-wing currents" exerted a strong influence on the KSA. Karin Priester summed up in 2015 that the KSA's activities consisted of an "ineffective thirst for action reminiscent of student happenings". They are "far from the subcultural, national-revolutionary activism of the neo-fascist Casa Pound network in Italy."

=== Organising the zwischentag fair ===
For the 50th edition of his journal Sezession, Kubitschek and Felix Menzel, chief editor of the right-wing youth magazine Blaue Narzisse (Blue Narcissus), organised the zwischentag (roughly: between-day, inter-day) fair that took place on 6 October 2012 in Berlin, attracting more than 700 visitors and many organisations, artists and businesses from the Neue Rechte orbit, including right-wing extremists. He continued the event in 2013, although the JF declined to have a stall there because of the inclusion of the Italian neo-fascist Gabriele Adinolfi.

=== Promoting the Identitarians ===
In 2012, Kubitschek and Martin Lichtmesz, another Sezession author, attended the Convent international of the Bloc identitaire in Orange, France. In one of the first academic publications on the Identitarian movement in 2014, many of Kubitschek's projects, like the Sezession journal, the Antaios publishing house, the IfS think tank, the KSA activist group and the zwischentag fair, were mentioned as part of the wider Identitarian political and journalistic milieu. Another publication called him, Lichtmesz, and Menzel the central protagonists of the movement's German branch. The Lower Saxon Ministry of the Interior stated that Kubitschek "had campaigned for the Identitarians' goals in writing as well as on public events in the past". Volker Weiß claims that he was instrumental in spreading the concept in Germany.

=== Speaking at PEGIDA rallies ===
Kubitschek appeared in 2015 together with his family as the main speaker at three rallies of LEGIDA, PEGIDA's Leipzig offshoot. The first time together with Jürgen Elsässer, responsible for the conspiracist, Third Positionist magazine Compact. Both activists stated that the rallies were also about "criticism of the [political] system". In January, he presented a position paper on "Immigration and Identity", using 'integration' as a combat term after the sociologist Annette Treibel-Illian had proposed that, for integration in a multi-cultural society, native people should also make an effort.

Kubitschek also spoke as the main orator at PEGIDA rallies in Dresden, e.g. next to the Dutch right-wing populist Geert Wilders. He stated to see himself as a kind of "middleman" between the PEGIDA movement's local branches. He also tried to find common ground with Elsässer at a Compact event.

The scholar of far-right extremism Olaf Sundermeyer concluded from his call for "civil disobedience" at a Dresden rally in autumn 2015 that he would elevate the "violent protest at Heidenau to an example for others". Although he distanced himself from violence, Pfahl-Traughber states that his "political rigorism" was obvious. Kubitschek, among others, is supposed to have provided PEGIDA supporters "with arguments for islamophobic and xenophobic discourse". Dresden-based political scientist Hans Vorländer claimed that he advocated "völkisch positions", making the Identitarians compatible with the political mainstream. Other experts called him a "mentor of PEGIDA" and that he "contributed massively to radicalise the racist PEGIDA movement". His appearances with PEGIDA have boosted his prominence significantly.

In February 2015, Kubitschek appeared in Italy as a guest of Matteo Salvini at a mass rally of his party, the right-wing populist, regionalist and xenophobic Lega Nord, where he was introduced as a PEGIDA representative.

=== Initiating the EinProzent ===
In 2015, he was among the founders of the association Ein Prozent für unser Land (One Percent For Our Country), together with Compact chief editor Jürgen Elsässer and constitutional lawyer and activist Karl Albrecht Schachtschneider. The organisation, proclaimed as a rightist resistance movement, is in close contact with the Identitarians around Martin Sellner and is seen as part of the Neue Rechte. Being financed mainly through donations, it deals in publicity campaigns in online media. While the exterior seems respectable and mainstream-compatible, says sociologist Anna-Lena Lerkenhoff, there is often an "idealising and downplaying representation of racist protest". A well-publicised constitutional complaint "against the policy of mass immigration" (Kubitschek) was rejected by the Constitutional Court in 2016.

After the terrorist attack in Berlin shortly before Christmas 2016, Kubitschek was present during a silent vigil with EinProzent in front of the seat of government on 21 December. Identitarians and various AfD heads also attended. Several media commentators accused the participants of abusing post-terror mourning for political purposes.

=== Other appearances ===
Kubitschek frequently serves as a speaker at various events, e.g. in 2006 at the Preußische Akademie (Prussian Academy) of the Junge Landsmannschaft Ostpreußen (originally the youth branch of the association of Germans expelled from East Prussia, now classified as right-wing extremist), or with Burschenschaften (traditionalist student fraternities), esp. those of the ultra-conservative Burschenschaftliche Gemeinschaft. In 2015, he spoke at the Burschentag, a traditional fraternity convention in Eisenach, Thuringia, together with Wilhelm Brauneder, FPÖ member and former president of the National Council of Austria.

Furthermore, in 2011, Kubitschek appeared as a speaker at a readers' meeting of the Lesen & Schenken publishing house, owned by far-right extremist Dietmar Munier.

In November 2016, Kubitschek was invited to a political panel discussion on 19 January 2017 at Municipal Theatre Magdeburg, a decision which drew heavy criticism for legitimising him in the political arena. This would have been Kubitschek's first invitation to a discussion forum outside the far-right milieu and has been called an "accolade for such a muddled far-right ideologue" by Saxony-Anhalt Minister-President Haseloff. After another invited participant, that State's Minister of the Interior Holger Stahlknecht (Conservative), bowed down to political pressure and retreated from the event, the discussion was cancelled due to the political "imbalance" thus created.

== Reception ==
Roland Eckert, a Trier-based sociologist, stated in 2011 in a talk given at the Stiftung Demokratie Saarland (Foundation Democracy Saarland) that Kubitschek combines Alain de Benoist's ethnopluralism with ideas of Weimar- and Nazi-era legal philosopher Carl Schmitt and the contemporaneous biologist Konrad Lorenz. Eckert concluded that Kubitschek's publications regarding immigration aim at an "offensive against Muslim immigrants". It is to be expected, he said, that Kubitschek's strategy would "inflame conflicts".

Most of Kubitschek's books are published by Antaios, e.g. Deutsche Opfer, fremde Täter (German victims, foreign offenders) about crime and ethnicity, a collaboration with Michael Paulwitz, deemed to be close to the Idenititarians. The book's political ideas (among them Deutschfeindlichkeit, i.e. Germanophobia, associated with the far-right) are said to be close to the nationally liberated zone (a concept by the NPD's youth wing) and to the Italian CasaPound movement. The book project is viewed as an example how "a combination of national-conservative and far-right discourses is attempted".

Kellershohn claimed that Kubitschek's book Provokation (2007) would develop the "ideological background" for the IfS's envisioned "strategy of seizing [mental] territory" by imagining a 'proto-civil war' in a progressing multicultural society. Kellershohn sees the text as one of the foundational ones for the Identitarians.

Some of Kubitschek's articles were published in other rightist media like the quarterly journal Neue Ordnung (New Order), published by Wolfgang Dvorak-Stocker, once a co-editor of Sezession. The Documentary Archive of the Austrian Resistance views them as right-wing extremist.

In an op-ed for Christ und Welt (Christ and World), a Christian supplement for the Zeit newspaper, political scientist Christiane Florin judges Kubitschek's and his wife's publications to be far-right.

The Munich-based sociologist Armin Nassehi published a correspondence of him and Kubitschek in 2015, in which he called him a "right-wing intellectual" and his publishing house national-conservative. Volker Weiß criticised this categorisation as misconceiving his position as being close to classical conservativism which is far from what "Kubitschek's set" espouses. Kubitschek just wants so become socially acceptable through "'conservative' interview partners" and Nassehi facilitated this strategy.

== Selected works ==
Monographs

- with Peter Felser (1999): Raki am Igman. Texte und Reportagen aus dem Bosnien-Einsatz der Bundeswehr [Raki at the Igman. Texts and reports from the Bundeswehr mission in Bosnia]. Stuttgart: Edition die Lanze. (Reprint (2001): Bad Vilbel: Edition Antaios.)
- (2006): 20 Jahre Junge Freiheit. Idee und Geschichte einer Zeitung [20 Years of Junge Freiheit. Idea and history of a newspaper]. Schnellroda: Edition Antaios.
- (2007): Provokation [Provocation]. Schnellroda: Edition Antaios.
- with Michael Paulwitz (2011): Deutsche Opfer, fremde Täter. Ausländergewalt in Deutschland. Hintergrund – Chronik – Prognose [German Victims, Foreign Offenders. Immigrant Violence in Germany. Background – Chronology – Forecast]. Schnellroda: Edition Antaios.
- (2016): Die Spurbreite des schmalen Grats. Texte 2000-2016 [The width of the fine line. Texts 2000-2016]. Schnellroda: Verlag Antaios.

Editorship

- with Karlheinz Weißmann, Ellen Kositza (eds.) (2000): Lauter dritte Wege. Armin Mohler zum Achtzigsten [Nothing but Third Ways. For Armin Mohler's Eightieth birthday. Bad Vilbel: Edition Antaios.
- with Erik Lehnert (2009): Joachim Fernau. Leben und Werk in Texten und Bildern [Joachim Fernau. Life and Work in Texts and Pictures]. Schnellroda: Edition Antaios.
- with Ellen Kositza (eds.) (2015): Tristesse Droite. Die Abende von Schnellroda [Tristesse Droite. The Schnellroda Evenings]. Schnellroda: Verlag Antaios.

Conversations

- (2004): Und plötzlich ist alles politisch. Im Gespräch mit Brigadegeneral Reinhard Günzel [And suddenly everything is political. In conversation with brigadier-general Reinhard Günzel]. Schnellroda: Edition Antaios.
- (2006): Unsere Zeit kommt. Im Gespräch mit Karlheinz Weißmann [Our Time Is Coming. In conversation with Karlheinz Weißmann]. Schnellroda: Edition Antaios.
- (2007): Deutschland auf Augenhöhe. Im Gespräch mit Gerd Schultze-Rhonhof [Germany at eye level. In conversation with Gerd Schultze-Rhonhof]. Schnellroda: Edition Antaios.

Contributions

- (1994): "Ernst von Salomon". In: Michael Hageböck (ed.): JF-Sommeruniversität 1993 in Ravensburg [JF summer school, Ravensburg 1993]. Potsdam: Junge Freiheit, pp. 209 ff.
- (2008): "Preußen! Und nun?" [Prussia! And now?]. In: Heiko Luge (ed.): Grenzgänge. Liber amicorum für den nationalen Dissidenten Hans-Dietrich Sander zum 80. Geburtstag [Border crossings. Liber amicorum for the 80th birthday of national dissident Hans-Dietrich Sander]. Graz: Ares-Verlag, pp. 242 ff.

== See also ==
- Neue Rechte
- PEGIDA
- German far-right
- Junge Freiheit
- Armin Mohler

== Bibliography ==
- Anna-Lena Herkenhoff (2016): "Neurechte Netzwerke und die Initiative 'Ein Prozent für unser Land'" [Neo-rightist Networks and the Initiative »One Percent For Our Country«]. In: Alexander Häusler, Fabian Virchow (eds.): Neue soziale Bewegung von rechts? Zukunftsängste. Abstieg der Mitte. Ressentiments – Eine Flugschrift [New Social Movement From the Right? Anxieties about the Future. Social Decline. Resentment – A Pamphlet]. Hamburg: VSA, pp. 73–83.
- Helmut Kellershohn: "Provokationselite von rechts: Die Konservativ-subversive Aktion" [Provocatory Elite From the Right: The 'Konservativ-Subversive Aktion'] (2010). In: Regina Wamper, Helmut Kellershohn, Martin Dietzsch (eds.): Rechte Diskurspiraterien. Strategien der Aneignung linker Codes, Symbole und Aktionsformen [Rightist Discourse Piracies. Strategies of Appropriating Leftist Codes, Symbols and Forms of Action]. Münster: Unrast, pp. 224–240.
- Marc Felix Serrao: "Der kalte Blick von rechts: Götz Kubitschek will der Anführer einer neuen konservativen Bewegung sein – seine Gegner nennen ihn einen Salonfaschisten und fürchten seine aggressiven Aktionen" [The Cold Look From the Right. Götz Kubitschek Wants to Be the Leader of a New Conservative Movement – His Enemies Call Him a Drawing-Room Fascist and Fear His Aggressive Actions] (2008), ProjektArbeit 7/2, pp. 50–55.
