= Reinhard Günzel =

German general

Reinhard Günzel (born April 5, 1944, in The Hague) is a former German general. He joined the Bundeswehr in 1963. He commanded the parachute battalion in Merzig, a Jägerregiment in Trier and the Jägerbrigade in Frankenberg. He also studied history and philosophy in Tübingen. He was the commander of the Kommando Spezialkräfte (KSK) from November 2000 until November 2003.

Günzel was dismissed in 2003 because he expressed his solidarity with antisemitic statements by Christian Democratic Union member of the federal parliament Martin Hohmann. Günzel send a letter supporting Hohmann, and his speech that compared "the actions of Jews in the 1917 Russian revolution with those of the Nazis". Günzel was fired from his position as General by Defence Minister Peter Struck. Hohmann became a member of the far-right Alternative for Germany.

Günzel is the author of Secret Warriors, a book in which, according to a 2020 article in The New York Times, "he placed the KSK in the tradition of a notorious special forces unit under the Nazis that committed numerous war crimes [(Brandenburgers)], including massacres of Jews. He has been a popular speaker at far-right events".

== Publications ==
- Götz Kubitschek, Reinhard Günzel: Und plötzlich ist alles politisch. Im Gespräch mit Brigadegeneral Reinhard Günzel. 2., durchgesehene Auflage. Edition Antaios, Schnellroda 2004, ISBN 3-935063-60-1.
- Reinhard Günzel, Ulrich K. Wegener, Wilhelm Walther: Geheime Krieger. Drei deutsche Kommandoverbände im Bild. Pour le Mérite, Selent 2005, ISBN 3-932381-29-7.
- Reinhard Günzel: Vorwort. In: H. Hoffmann: Die Flinte. Waffe, Werkzeug, Sportgerät. DWJ, Blaufelden 2005, ISBN 3-936632-51-0.
- Dokumentation: Der Fall Hohmann-Günzel. VHS-Video oder DVD. Berlin 2004.
