= The System (Nazism) =

Term used in Nazi Germany to refer to the Weimar Republic (1920s Germany)

"The System" (German: Das System) was a derogatory term used by the Nazis to denote contemptuously the Weimar Republic, whose official name was German Reich (Deutsches Reich), and its institutions. In Nazi propaganda, the word was used in a number of compounds: for example, the period from the German Revolution of 1918–1919 to the Machtergreifung in 1933 was called "The time of the System" (German: Systemzeit) and political opponents of the Nazis from this period were called "System parties", "System politicians" or the "System press". After 1933, the term was quickly adopted to everyday use.

Another Nazi phrase used for the republic and its politicians was "the November criminals" or "the regime of the November criminals" (German: November-Verbrecher), referring to the month the republic was founded in (November 1918). This term was used also by other nationalistic groups.
