= Weimar Republic =

German state from 1918 to 1933

German Reich Deutsches Reich
- 1918–1933^{(a)}
- Flag (1919–1933) Coat of arms (1919–1928)^{(b)}
- Anthem: Das Lied der Deutschen "The Song of the Germans" (from 1922)
- Capital and largest city: Berlin; 52°31′N 13°23′E
- Official languages: German
- Common languages: Unofficial: Low German, Polish, Limburgish, Frisian, Yiddish, Danish, Sorbian, Sinte Romani, Lithuanian
- Religion: 1925 census: 63.5% Protestant (Lutheran, Reformed, United); 32.4% Catholic; 0.9% Jewish; 4.1% Other
- Demonym: German
- Government: Federal semi-presidential republic: under an interim government (1918–1919); under presidential rule by decree (1930–1933)
- President
  - 1919–1925: Friedrich Ebert
  - 1925–1934: Paul von Hindenburg
- Chancellor
  - 1918-1919 (first): Friedrich Ebert
  - 1933 (last): Adolf Hitler
- Legislature: Reichstag; Reichsrat
- Historical era: Interwar period
  - Proclaimed: 9 November 1918
  - Provisional government: 10 November 1918
  - Constitution: 11 August 1919
  - Admitted to the League of Nations: 8 September 1926
  - Rule by decree begins: 29 March 1930
  - Hitler inaugurated: 30 January 1933
  - Reichstag Fire Decree: 28 February 1933
  - Enabling Act: 23 March 1933
  - Formally abolished: 5 June 1945

Area
- 1925: 468,787 km^{2} (181,000 sq mi)

Population
  - 1925: 62,411,000
  - Density: 133.129/km^{2} (344.8/sq mi)
- Currency: 1919–23 "Papiermark" (ℳ); 1923–24 Rentenmark (RM); 1924–33 Reichsmark (ℛℳ)
Preceded by	Succeeded by
German Empire	1933: Nazi Germany; 1945: Allied-occupied Germany
- Today part of: Germany; Poland; Russia (Note: Kaliningrad Oblast); Lithuania (Note: Parts of Klaipėda County and Tauragė County); Netherlands (Note: Duivelsberg)
- 1. Although the Weimar Republic was effectively dissolved in 1933, its constitution was not formally abolished, meaning the Weimar Republic de jure lasted until 1945, when the Berlin Declaration formally abolished it.; 2. The coat of arms of the Weimar Republic shown above is the version used before 1928; after 1928, it was changed to the model by Karl-Tobias Schwab, which is the same model that was readopted in 1950.
- The flag of Nazi Germany shown above is the version introduced after the fall of the Weimar Republic in 1933 and used until 1935, when it was replaced by the swastika flag, similar, but not the same as the flag of the Nazi Party that had already been used since 1933 as a mandatory party flag along with the tricolour national flag (see also: Flag of Nazi Germany).

The Weimar Republic (Note: German: Weimarer Republik, [ˈvaɪmaʁɐ ʁepuˈbliːk]) was a historical period of the German state from 9 November 1918 to 23 March 1933, during which it was a constitutional republic for the first time in history. The state was officially named the German Reich, (Note: German: Deutsches Reich, lit. 'German Realm') but was more commonly referred to, and unofficially proclaimed itself, as the German Republic. (Note: German: Deutsche Republik) The period's informal name is derived from the city of Weimar, where the republic's constituent assembly took place. During the interwar period in the Anglophone world, the republic was usually simply called "Germany", with "Weimar Republic" (a term introduced by Adolf Hitler in 1929) not commonly used until the 1930s. The Weimar Republic had a semi-presidential system.

At the end of the First World War (1914–1918), the German Empire was economically and militarily exhausted and sued the Allies for peace. Awareness of an imminent defeat sparked the German revolution, the abdication of Kaiser Wilhelm II, the collapse of the Empire and the proclamation of the Weimar Republic. Hostilities in the war formally ceased with the Armistice of 11 November 1918.

In its initial years, grave problems beset the Republic, such as hyperinflation and political extremism, including political murders and two attempted coups d'état by contending paramilitaries; internationally, it suffered isolation, reduced diplomatic standing and contentious relationships with the great powers. By 1924, a great deal of monetary and political stability was restored, and the republic enjoyed relative prosperity for the next five years; this period, sometimes known as the Golden Twenties, was characterized by significant cultural flourishing, social progress, and gradual improvement in foreign relations. Under the Locarno Treaties of 1925, Germany moved toward normalizing relations with its neighbors, recognizing most territorial changes under the 1919 Treaty of Versailles and committing never to go to war. The following year, it joined the League of Nations, which marked its reintegration into the international community. (Note: While Germany fulfilled most of its treaty obligations, it never completely disarmed, and paid only a small portion of war reparations (by twice restructuring its debt through the Dawes Plan and the Young Plan).) Nevertheless, especially on the political far-right, there remained strong and widespread resentment against the treaty and those who had signed and supported it.

The Great Depression of October 1929 severely affected Germany's tenuous progress; high unemployment and subsequent social and political unrest led to the collapse of Chancellor Hermann Müller's grand coalition and the beginning of the presidential cabinets. From March 1930 onwards, President Paul von Hindenburg used emergency powers to back chancellors Heinrich Brüning, Franz von Papen, and Kurt von Schleicher. The Great Depression, exacerbated by Brüning's policy of deflation, led to a surge in unemployment. On 30 January 1933, Hindenburg appointed Adolf Hitler as chancellor to head a coalition government; his Nazi Party held two out of ten cabinet seats. Von Papen, as vice-chancellor and Hindenburg's confidant, was to serve as the éminence grise who would keep Hitler under control; these intentions severely underestimated Hitler's political ambitions. By the end of March 1933, the Reichstag Fire Decree and the Enabling Act of 1933 were used in the perceived state of emergency to effectively grant the new chancellor broad power to act outside parliamentary control. Hitler promptly used these powers to thwart constitutional governance and suspend civil liberties, which brought about the swift collapse of democracy at the federal and state level, and the creation of a one-party dictatorship under his leadership.

Until the end of World War II in Europe in 1945, the Nazis governed Germany under the pretense that all the extraordinary measures and laws they implemented were constitutional; notably, there was never an attempt to replace or substantially amend the Weimar Constitution. Nevertheless, Hitler's seizure of power (Machtergreifung) had effectively ended the republic, replacing its constitutional framework with Führerprinzip, the principle that "the Führer's word is above all written law".

== Name and symbols ==
The Weimar Republic is so called because the Weimar National Assembly that adopted its constitution met in Weimar from 6 February to 11 August 1919.

=== Terminology ===
Even though the National Assembly chose to retain the old name Deutsches Reich (Art. 1 of the Constitution), hardly anyone used it during the Weimar period, and no single name for the new state gained widespread acceptance. To the right of the spectrum, the politically engaged rejected the new democratic model and were appalled to see the honor of the traditional word Reich associated with it. The Catholic Centre Party favored the term Deutscher Volksstaat (German People's State), (Note: During the time of the Weimar Republic, terms such as People's Republic and People's State were used by republican movements across the political spectrum. It was only during and after World War II that such terminology became more specifically associated with socialist and Communist regimes.) while on the moderate left, Chancellor Friedrich Ebert's Social Democratic Party of Germany preferred Deutsche Republik (German Republic). By the mid-1920s, most Germans referred to their government informally as the Deutsche Republik, but for many, especially on the right, the word "Republik" was a painful reminder of a government structure that they believed had been imposed by foreign statesmen and of the expulsion of Emperor Wilhelm II in the wake of a massive national humiliation.

The first recorded mention of the term Republik von Weimar (Republic of Weimar) came during a speech delivered by Adolf Hitler at a Nazi Party rally in Munich on 24 February 1929. A few weeks later, the term Weimarer Republik was first used, again by Hitler in a newspaper article. Only during the 1950s did the term become mainstream, both within and outside Germany.

According to historian Richard J. Evans:

The continued use of the term 'German Empire', Deutsches Reich, by the Weimar Republic ... conjured up an image among educated Germans that resonated far beyond the institutional structures Bismarck created: the successor to the Roman Empire; the vision of God's Empire here on earth; the universality of its claim to suzerainty; and a more prosaic but no less powerful sense, the concept of a German state that would include all German speakers in Central Europe – 'one People, one Reich, one Leader', as the Nazi slogan was to put it.

=== Flag and coat of arms ===
The black-red-gold tricolour of the 1848 German revolutions was named as the national flag in the Weimar Constitution of 1919. It was abolished after the entry into force of the Enabling Act of 1933 when the Nazi Party gained total power, in favour of two co-official national flags: the old black-white-red imperial tricolour and the flag of the Nazi Party. From 1935, the Nazi flag with the symbol offset became the sole national flag of the Third Reich, and after World War II, both the Federal Republic of Germany and the German Democratic Republic readopted the black-red-gold flag. The coat of arms was initially based on the Reichsadler ("imperial eagle") introduced by the Paulskirche Constitution of 1849, and announced in November 1919. In 1928, a new design by Karl-Tobias Schwab was adopted as national coat of arms, which was used until being replaced by the Nazi Reichsadler in 1935, and readopted by the Federal Republic of Germany in 1950.

== Armed forces ==
War ensign of Germany (Reichskriegsflagge) during the Weimar period (1921–1933)

Following Germany's defeat in World War I, several million soldiers of the Imperial German Army either simply dispersed on their own or were formally demobilized. The provisional civilian government and the Supreme Army Command (OHL) planned to transfer the remaining units to a peacetime army. Under the terms of the Treaty of Versailles, the new army, the Reichswehr, was limited to 100,000 men and the Reichsmarine (navy), to 15,000. The treaty prohibited an air force, submarines, large warships and armored vehicles.

The official formation of the Reichswehr took place on 1 January 1921, after the limitations had been met. The soldiers of the Reichswehr took their oath to the Weimar Constitution. The commander-in-chief was the Reich president, while the Reich minister of the armed forces exercised command authority. Military right of command (Kommandogewalt) was in the hands of the OHL. The resulting dualism between civilian power and military command was to become a heavy burden on the Republic. Whereas Reichswehr Minister Otto Gessler was content with limited political and administrative duties during his tenure (1920–1928), Colonel General Hans von Seeckt, Chief of Army Command from 1920 to 1926, succeeded in largely removing the Reichswehr from the control of the Reichstag. Under Seeckt the Reichswehr developed into what many historians consider a "state within the state".

During the 1920 Kapp Putsch, Seeckt refused to deploy the Reichswehr against the Freikorps involved in the putsch, but immediately afterwards had the Ruhr Red Army brutally suppressed during the Ruhr uprising. In 1921, the Reichswehr organized the Black Reichswehr, a secret reserve networked within the Reichswehr and organized as labor battalions (Arbeitskommandos) to circumvent the Treaty of Versailles' 100,000 man limit on the German army. The Black Reichswehr was never involved in direct military action and was dissolved in 1923 after a group of its members attempted to overthrow the government in the Küstrin Putsch. The Reichswehr also developed far-reaching cooperation with the Soviet Red Army, leading among other things to the secret training of German military pilots in clear violation of the Treaty of Versailles.

With Seeckt's fall in 1926, the Reichswehr made a change in course for which Colonel (later General) Kurt von Schleicher was primarily responsible. The goal was to arouse broad social support for rearmament and to militarize society itself for the purpose of future warfare. Under Paul von Hindenburg's Reich presidency, Reichswehr leadership gained increasing political influence and eventually helped determine the composition of the Reich governments. As a result, the Reichswehr contributed significantly to the development of an authoritarian presidential system during the final phase of the Weimar Republic.

After Adolf Hitler announced the "regaining of military sovereignty" (reintroduction of conscription and other acts) in 1935, two years after his rise to power, the Reichswehr was absorbed into the new Wehrmacht. It was the unified armed forces of the Nazi regime.

== History ==
=== Background ===
Germany and the Central Powers fought the Allies of WWI between 28 July 1914 and 11 November 1918. The war ended with 20 million military and civilian deaths, including 2,037,000 German soldiers and from 424,000 to 763,000 civilians, many of them from disease and starvation as a result of the Allied blockade of Germany.

After four years of war on multiple fronts in Europe and around the world, the final Allied offensive began in August 1918, and the position of Germany and the Central Powers deteriorated, leading them to sue for peace. After initial offers were rejected by the Allied Powers, the hunger and privation of the war years came together with the awareness of an impending military defeat to help spark the German Revolution. On 9 November 1918, a republic was proclaimed, and the abdication of Kaiser Wilhelm II was announced, marking the end of Imperial Germany and the beginning of the Weimar Republic. The armistice that ended the fighting was signed on 11 November.

Germany lost the war because its allies were facing defeat and its economic resources were running out, while by late summer 1918 fresh American troops were arriving in France at the rate of 10,000 per day. Support among the population had begun to crumble in 1916, and by mid-1918, many Germans wanted an end to the war. Increasing numbers of them began to associate with the political left, such as the Social Democratic Party and the more radical Independent Social Democratic Party, which demanded an end to the war. When it became obvious to the generals that defeat was at hand, General Erich Ludendorff convinced the Kaiser that Germany needed to pursue an armistice and that the majority parties in the Reichstag, not the OHL, had to take responsibility for it. Although in retreat, the German armies were still on French and Belgian territory when the war ended on 11 November. Ludendorff and Paul von Hindenburg then began proclaiming that it was the defeatism of the civilian population – especially the socialists – that had made defeat inevitable. The stab-in-the-back myth was spread by the Right throughout the 1920s and ensured that many monarchists and conservatives would refuse to support the government of what they called the "November criminals". The destabilizing effect of the stab-in-the-back myth on the Weimar democracy was an important factor in the rise of National Socialism.

=== November Revolution (1918–1919) ===
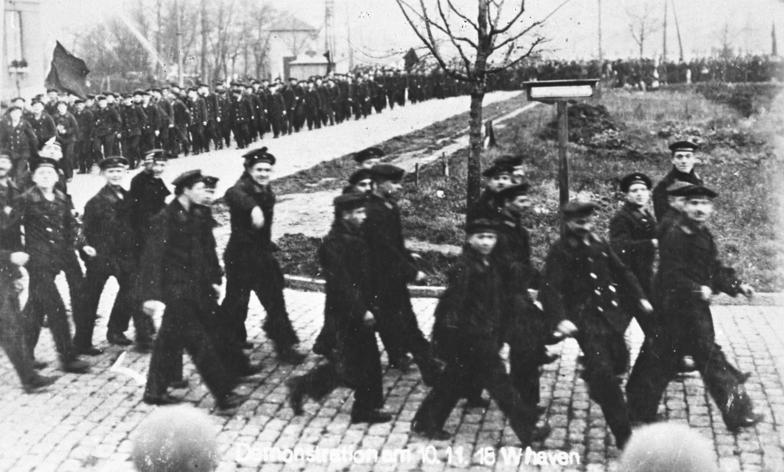
Sailors during the mutiny in Kiel, November 1918

On 29 October 1918, a rebellion broke out among sailors at Wilhelmshaven; similar unrest then spread to become the Kiel mutiny on 3 November. Sailors, soldiers and workers began electing workers' and soldiers' councils (Arbeiter- und Soldatenräte) modelled after the soviets of the 1917 Russian Revolution. The revolution spread throughout Germany, and participants seized military and civil power in individual cities. The power takeovers were achieved everywhere with little or no violence.

At the time, the socialist movement, which represented mostly laborers, was split among two major left-wing parties: the Independent Social Democratic Party of Germany (USPD), which called for immediate peace negotiations and favored a soviet-style command economy, and the Social Democratic Party of Germany (SPD), also known as the Majority Social Democratic Party of Germany (MSPD), which had supported the war and favoured a parliamentary system. The rebellion caused great fear among supporters of the monarchy and in the middle classes because of the soviet-style aspirations of the councils. To centrist and conservative citizens, the country looked to be on the verge of a communist revolution.

By 7 November, the revolution had reached Munich, resulting in the flight of King Ludwig III of Bavaria. The MSPD decided to make use of their support at the grassroots level and put themselves at the front of the movement. They joined the calls for Kaiser Wilhelm II to abdicate, and when he refused, Chancellor Maximilian of Baden made a public announcement that the Kaiser and Crown Prince Wilhelm had already done so. Gustav Noske (MSPD) was sent to Kiel to prevent any further unrest and took on the task of controlling the mutinous sailors and their supporters in the Kiel barracks. The sailors and soldiers welcomed him, and he was able to defuse the situation.

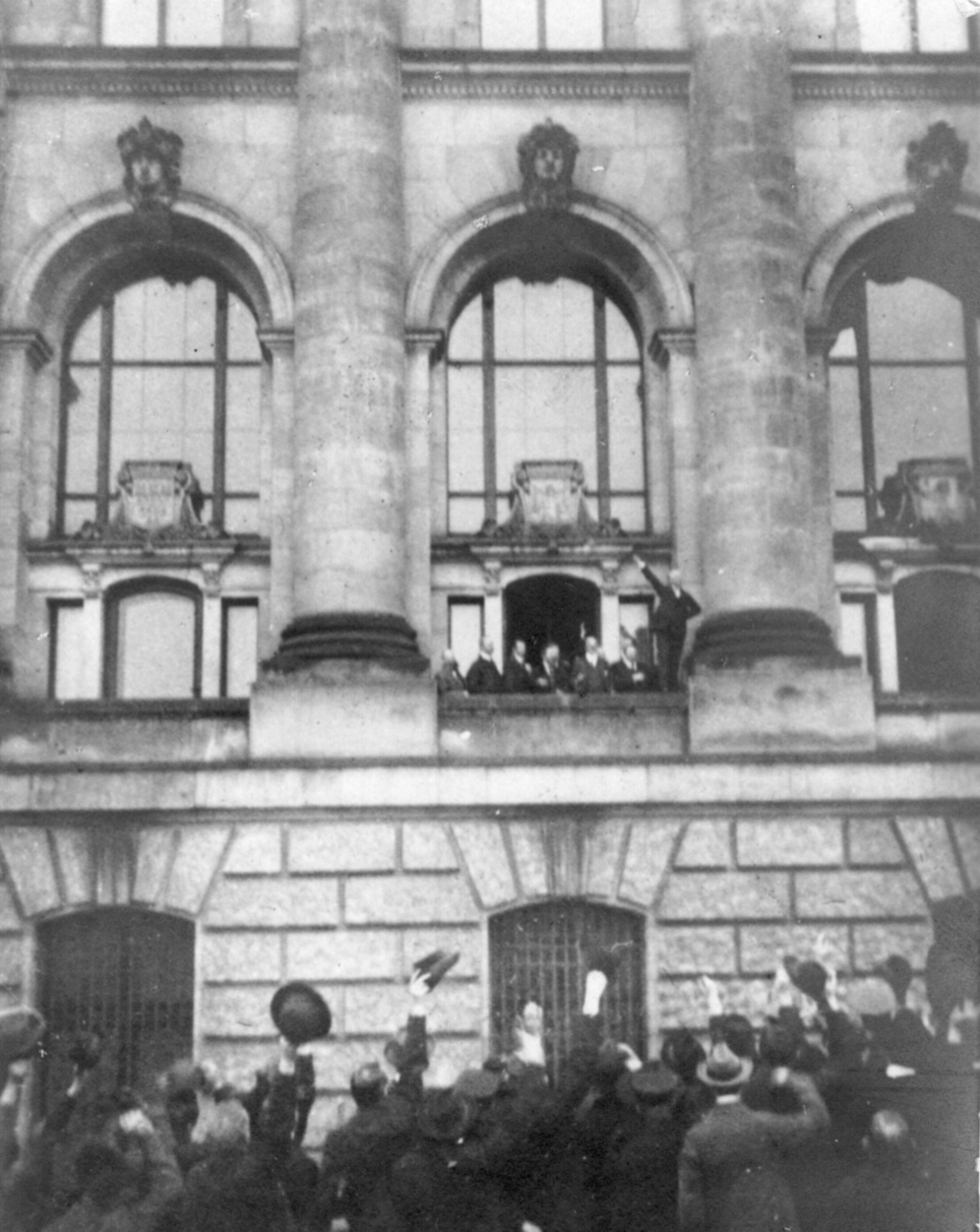
Philipp Scheidemann proclaiming the German Republic from the Reichstag building

On 9 November 1918, the German Republic was proclaimed by MSPD member Philipp Scheidemann at the Reichstag building in Berlin, angering Friedrich Ebert, the leader of the MSPD, who thought that the question of monarchy or republic should be answered by a national assembly. Two hours later, a Free Socialist Republic was proclaimed at the Berlin Palace. The proclamation was issued by Karl Liebknecht, co-leader with Rosa Luxemburg of the communist Spartakusbund (Spartacus League), a group of a few hundred supporters of the Russian Revolution that had allied itself with the USPD in 1917. On the same day, in a move that was contrary to the constitution because only the Kaiser could appoint a chancellor, Prince Max of Baden, at Ebert's request, transferred his powers as chancellor to him. In view of the mass support for more radical reforms among the workers' councils, a coalition government called the Council of the People's Deputies (Rat der Volksbeauftragten) was established, consisting of three MSPD and three USPD members. Led by Ebert for the MSPD and Hugo Haase for the USPD, it governed Germany from November 1918 to January 1919. Although the new government was confirmed by the Berlin Workers' and Soldiers' Council, it was opposed by the Spartacus League.

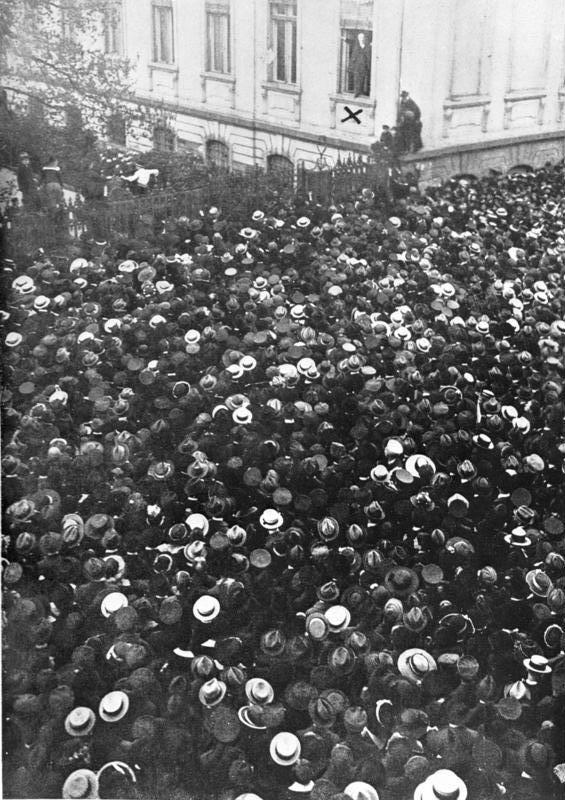
Philipp Scheidemann addresses a crowd from a window of the Reich Chancellery, 9 November 1918.

On 11 November 1918, an armistice was signed at Compiègne by German representatives. It effectively ended military operations between the Allies and Germany. It amounted to a German capitulation, without any concessions by the Allies; the naval blockade was to continue until complete peace terms were agreed on.

The Executive Council of the Workers' and Soldiers' Council of Greater Berlin called for a National Congress of Councils (Reichsrätekongress) which took place from 16 to 21 December 1918. Against the opposition of the more radical members who demanded a socialist republic, Ebert, backed by the large MSPD majority at the Congress, was able to schedule the election for a provisional National Assembly that would act as an interim parliament and be given the task of writing a democratic constitution for a parliamentary government.

To ensure that the fledgling government maintained control over the country, Ebert and General Wilhelm Groener, Ludendorff's successor as leader of the Supreme Army Command (OHL), concluded the secret Ebert–Groener pact on 10 November. Over the telephone, Ebert promised that he would allow sole command of the troops to remain with the officer corps, while Groener pledged that the military would be loyal to the government and that it would help it in its fight against left-wing revolutionaries. The agreement marked the acceptance of the new government by the military, but the new Reichswehr armed forces, limited by the Treaty of Versailles to 100,000 army soldiers and 15,000 sailors, remained fully under the control of the German officer class.

A rift developed between the MSPD and USPD after Ebert called upon the OHL for troops to put down a mutiny by a leftist military unit on 23/24 December 1918 in which members of the Volksmarinedivision (People's Navy Division) captured the city's garrison commander Otto Wels of the MSPD and occupied the Reich Chancellery where the Council of the People's Deputies had its offices. The ensuing street fighting left 11 Volksmarinedivision members and 56 members of the regular army dead. The USPD leaders were angered by what they believed was treachery by the MSPD, which in their view had joined with the anti-communist military to suppress the revolution. As a result, the USPD left the Council of the People's Deputies after only seven weeks. On 30 December, the split deepened when the Communist Party of Germany (KPD) was formed out of a number of radical left-wing groups, including the Spartacus League and the left wing of the USPD.

In January, the Spartacus League, in what was known as the Spartacist uprising, took advantage of a large strike in Berlin and attempted to establish a communist government. The uprising was put down by paramilitary Freikorps units consisting of volunteer soldiers. Following bloody street fights, Rosa Luxemburg and Karl Liebknecht were summarily killed by members of the volunteer Guards Cavalry Rifle Division after their arrests on 15 January. The murders provoked outrage, and the subsequent military trial of the perpetrators was widely seen as a sham, since it was conducted by their own comrades and presided over by Wilhelm Canaris, a friend of Waldemar Pabst, the commander of the Rifle Division. Pabst, the main instigator, and the alleged shooter, Hermann Souchon, were never charged.

Chart of the Weimar Constitution of 11 August 1919. It replaced the law concerning the provisional Reich power of 10 February 1919.

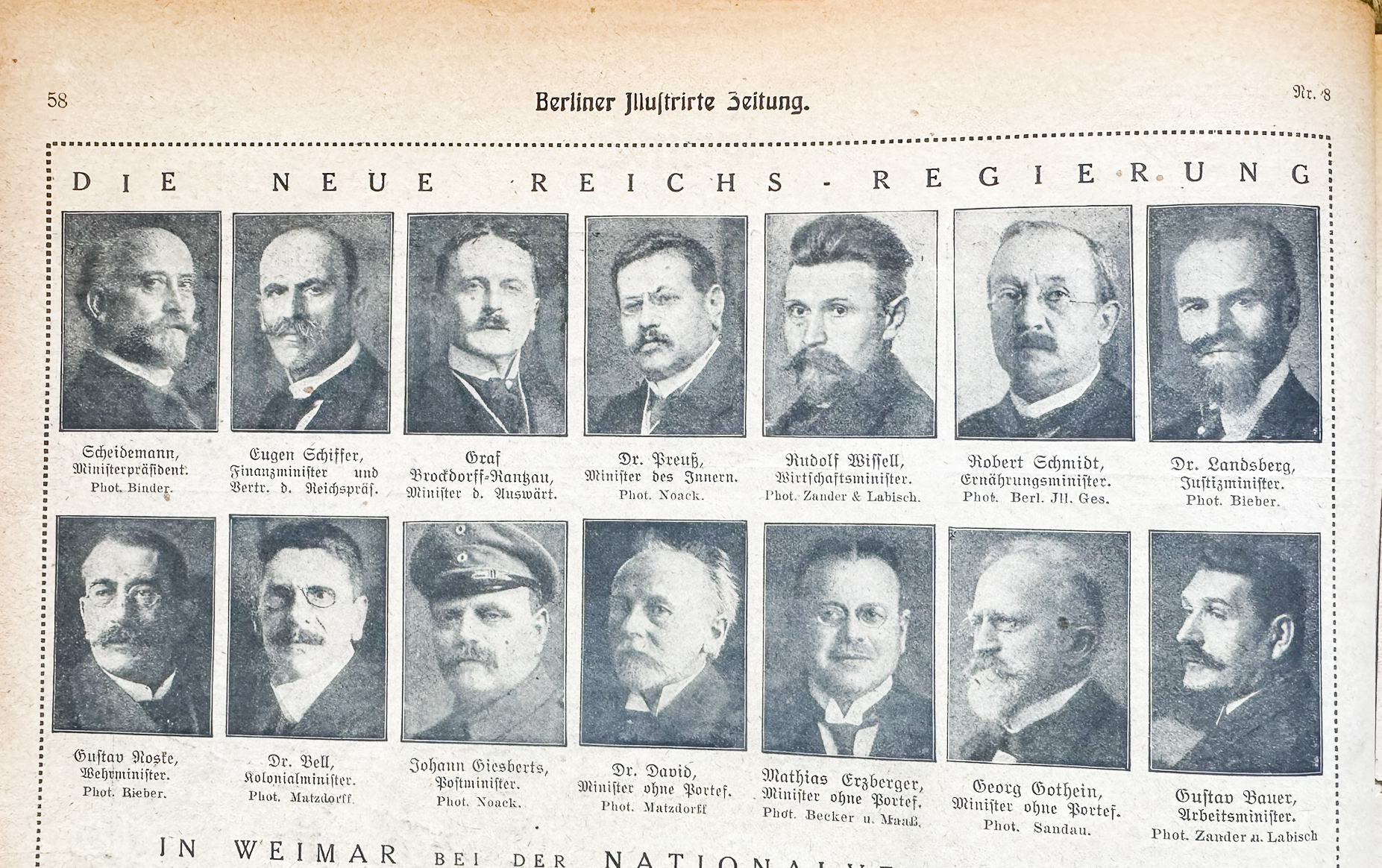
Members of the 1919 Weimar government

The National Assembly election, in which women were allowed to vote for the first time, took place on 19 January 1919. The MSPD won the largest share of the votes at 37.9%, with the USPD fifth at 7.6%. To avoid the ongoing fights in Berlin, the National Assembly convened in the city of Weimar, giving the future Republic its unofficial name. The Weimar Constitution created a parliamentary republic with the Reichstag elected by proportional representation.

During the debates in Weimar, fighting continued sporadically across Germany. On 7 April 1919, the Bavarian Soviet Republic was declared in Munich but quickly put down by Freikorps and remnants of the regular army. The fall of the Munich Soviet Republic to these units, many of which were on the extreme right, resulted in the growth of far-right, anti-Semitic movements and organizations in Bavaria, including Organisation Consul, the Nazi Party, and societies of exiled Russian monarchists. Revolutionary sentiment also arose in the eastern states where interethnic discontent between Germans and minority Poles led to the Silesian Uprisings and the Greater Poland uprising in the German Province of Posen, which became part of the Second Polish Republic under the terms of the Treaty of Versailles.

=== Years of crisis (1919–1923) ===
==== Burden from the First World War ====
In the four years following the First World War, the situation of most German civilians remained dire. The post-war economic crisis was a result of lost pre-war industrial exports, the loss of imported raw materials and foodstuffs due to the continental blockade, the loss of Germany's overseas colonies and the worsening debt balances that had been exacerbated by Germany's heavy reliance on bonds to pay for the war. The economic losses can be attributed in part to the extension of the Allied blockade of Germany until the Treaty of Versailles was signed on 28 June 1919. It is estimated that between 100,000 and 250,000 German civilians died of disease or starvation between the end of the war and the signing of the treaty. Many German civilians expected life to return to pre-war normality after it was lifted, but the severe food shortages continued. In 1922, for example, meat consumption had not increased since the war years. At 22 kilograms per person per year, it was less than half of the 52 kilograms consumed in 1913. German citizens felt the food shortages more deeply than during the war because the reality contrasted so starkly with their expectations.

Immediate post-war industrial production fell to the levels of the 1880s, or 57 percent of its value in 1913. The 1919 per capita GDP was only 73 percent of the comparable 1913 figure. Controlled demobilization kept unemployment initially at around one million. By January 1922, the unemployment rate had sunk to just 0.9%,, but inflation caused most workers' real wages to be significantly lower than they were in 1913. The hyperinflation that peaked in late 1923 had its worst effects on government workers, whose wages did not keep pace with private sector workers, and on middle class Germans who had invested in war bonds or who relied on savings, investments or pensions for their living. What had once been substantial savings became essentially worthless due to the enormous fall in the Papiermark's value.

After four years of war and famine, many German workers were disenchanted with the capitalist system and hoped for a new era under socialism or communism. Socialists dominated the new revolutionary government in Berlin, and numerous short-lived council republics were set up in cities across Germany. Even after they were suppressed, ideological conflicts between the Left and supporters of the former empire led to political violence and extremism. The young republic found itself in a nearly constant economic and political crisis until 1924.

==== Treaty of Versailles ====
The Treaty of Versailles ended the state of war between Germany and most of the Allied powers and set the conditions for peace. It was signed 28 June 1919 and can be divided into four main categories: territorial issues, disarmament, reparations and assignment of guilt.

German territorial losses from the Treaty of Versailles Administered by the League of Nations Annexed or transferred to neighbouring countries by the treaty, or later via plebiscite and League of Nation action Weimar Germany

Territorially, Germany had to renounce sovereignty over its colonies and in Europe lost 65,000 km^{2} (25,000 sq mi) or about 13% of its former territory – including 48% of its iron and 10% of its coal resources – along with 7 million people, or 12% of its population. The Saarland was put under the control of the League of Nations for 15 years, and the output of the area's coal mines went to France. Alsace–Lorraine, which Prussia had annexed following the Franco-Prussian War of 1870/71, once again became French. The northern part of Schleswig-Holstein went to Denmark following a plebiscite. In the east, a significant amount of territory was lost to a restored Poland. The Memel Territory was ceded to the Allied powers, and Danzig went to the League of Nations as the Free City of Danzig. The Polish Corridor left East Prussia physically separated from the rest of Germany.

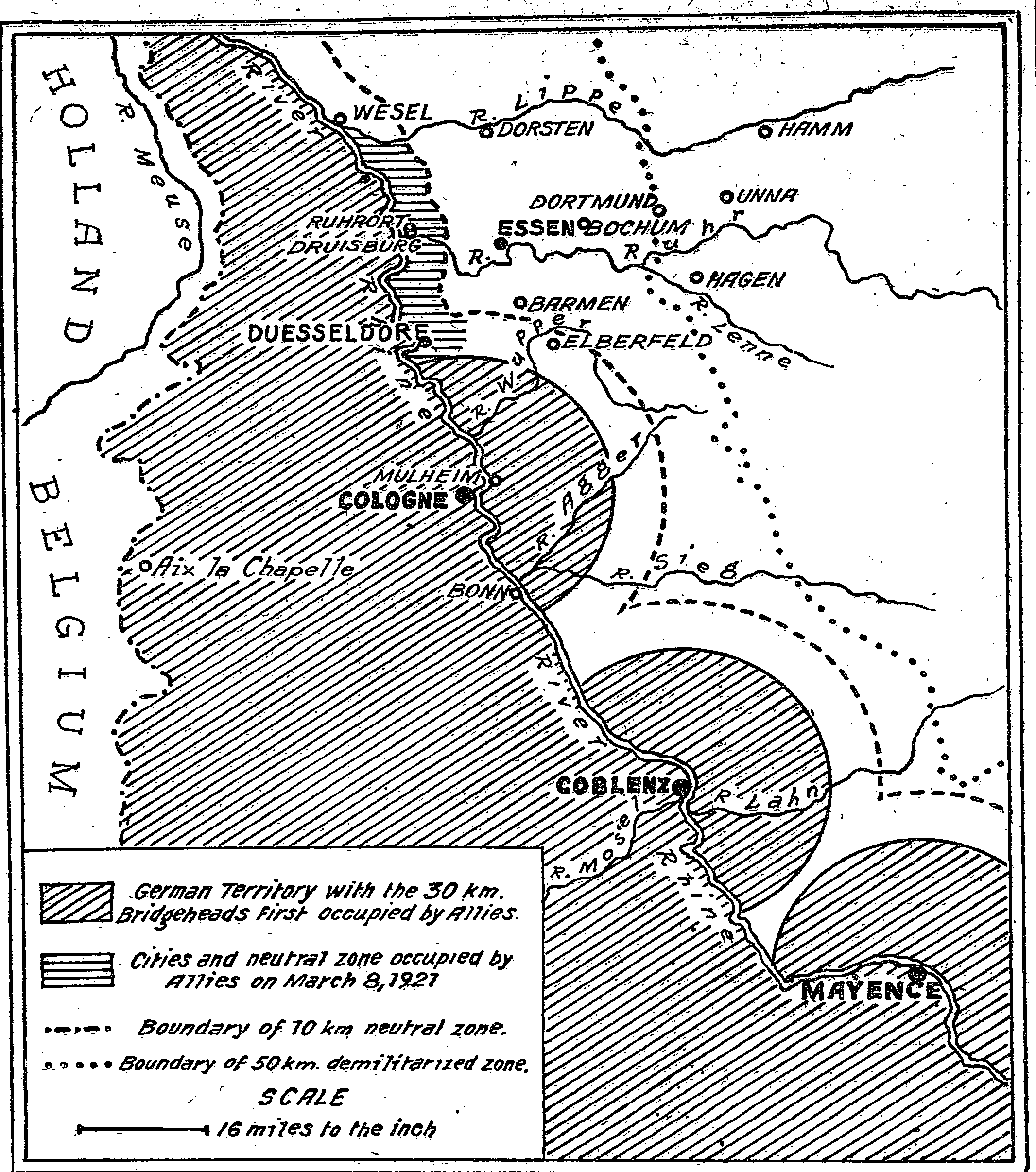
Map showing the areas under the Rhineland occupation and the bottleneck created between Coblenz and Mayence

Under the terms of both the Armistice of 1918 and of the Treaty of Versailles, French, British, Belgian and American troops occupied the Rhineland, the area of Germany on the west bank of the Rhine river, together with bridgeheads on the east bank near Cologne, Mainz and Koblenz. In addition, the Rhineland and an area stretching 50 kilometers east of the Rhine was to be demilitarized. France had demanded the occupation both to protect itself from a renewed German attack and as collateral for German reparations. The occupation was to last 5 years in the British zone, 10 in the American and 15 years in the French and Belgian zones, until 1934, but the last foreign troops evacuated the Rhineland on 30 June 1930.

The treaty's disarmament provisions were intended to make the future German army incapable of offensive action. It was limited to no more than 100,000 men with only 4,000 officers and no general staff; the navy could have at most 15,000 men and 1,500 officers. All fortifications in the Rhineland and 50 kilometers (31 miles) east of the river were to be demolished. Germany was prohibited from having an air force, tanks, poison gas, heavy artillery, submarines or dreadnoughts. A large number of its ships and all of its air-related armaments were to be surrendered.

Germany had to compensate the Allied Powers for the losses and damages of the war, with the exact amount left to be determined at a later date (Article 233). In the short term it was required to pay the equivalent of 20 billion gold marks in installments through April 1921 (Article 235).

The most contentious article of the treaty, the so-called War Guilt Clause, did not use the word "guilt". It stated that Germany and its allies accepted responsibility for all the loss and damage from a war that was imposed on the Allies by the aggression of Germany and its allies (Article 231).

The implications of Article 231 and the territorial losses especially angered the Germans. The treaty was reviled as a dictated rather than a negotiated peace. Philipp Scheidemann, then minister president of Germany, said to the Weimar National Assembly on 12 May 1919, "What hand should not wither that puts this fetter on itself and on us?" He resigned rather than accept the terms, but after the Allies threatened to resume hostilities, the National Assembly voted to approve the treaty on 23 June. It was signed in Paris five days later.

Explaining the rise of extreme nationalist movements in Germany shortly after the war, British historian Ian Kershaw pointed to the "national disgrace" that was "felt throughout Germany at the humiliating terms imposed by the victorious Allies and reflected in the Versailles Treaty...with its confiscation of territory on the eastern border and even more so its 'guilt clause'." Adolf Hitler repeatedly blamed the Republic and its democracy for accepting the oppressive terms of the treaty.

==== War guilt ====
Article 231 of the Versailles Treaty was widely perceived not only as a legal legitimization of reparations but also as a moral condemnation of Germany, and it triggered a storm of indignation among the German public. The hostility towards it came from across the political spectrum, from the far right to the moderate governing parties to the KPD.

After the treaty came into force, the Foreign Office continued the state's control of the debate over war guilt. The War Guilt Department financed and directed the Centre for the Study of the Causes of the War, which was to provide "scientific" support for the "campaign of innocence" abroad. For war-innocence propaganda at home, a "Working Committee of German Associations" was founded with representatives of many groups considered "fit for good society". In 1919, the Weimar National Assembly established a parliamentary committee to inquire into the events that had led to the "outbreak, prolongation and loss of the First World War". Its results were of questionable value due to a lack of cooperation from the civil service and military and to increasing interference from the government, which wanted to prevent a German admission of guilt before the world public. The committee met until 1932.

During the course of World War I, war reporting was the responsibility of the German General Staff and after 1918, of the Potsdam Reich Archives founded by General Hans von Seeckt, which dedicated itself to the task of "disproving" German war guilt and war crimes. As a result, it was the leadership of the Reichswehr with its largely anti-democratic civil service personnel that, along with the Foreign Office, determined the portrayal of the war in the Weimar Republic.

All in all, there was little objective and critical questioning of the causes of the war or of Germany's responsibility for it in academia, politics or the media during the Weimar period. The official view of history continued to follow the argument issued by the OHL in 1914 that Germany had been threatened by invasion and encirclement. Revising the conditions of the Versailles Treaty became the main goal of German foreign policy.

The consensus opposing the "war guilt clause" did much to promote agitation against foreign countries and the Weimar Constitution. Both the DNVP and, in particular, the NSDAP questioned the entire post-war order and propagated a "war guilt lie". In line with national conservative and bourgeois right-wing parties, they accused the governing parties of having contributed to Germany's humiliation by signing the treaty and of denying it the right to self-determination.

==== Political turmoil: Kapp Putsch and Ruhr uprising ====
The young republic was exposed from the beginning to attacks from both the extreme right and extreme left. The Left accused the Social Democrats of betraying the ideals of the labor movement because of their alliance with the old elites; the Right held the supporters of the Republic responsible for Germany's defeat in the First World War, denigrating them as "November criminals" and insinuating that the German army, which was still fighting on enemy soil when the war ended, had been stabbed in the back by them and the revolution (the stab-in-the-back myth).

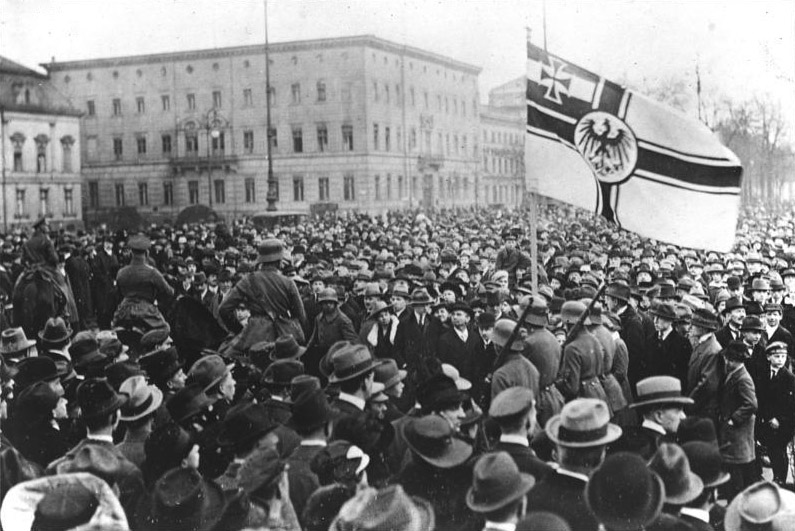
Crowds in Berlin watching the Marinebrigade Ehrhardt march in under the imperial war ensign during the Kapp Putsch

In the March 1920 Kapp Putsch, Freikorps units under General von Lüttwitz occupied the government quarter in Berlin. In an attempt to reverse the revolution and install an autocratic government, the former Prussian civil servant Wolfgang Kapp appointed himself Reich chancellor and Lüttwitz Reichswehr minister and commander-in-chief of the Reichswehr. The legal government fled Berlin and called for a general strike. The putsch quickly failed due in large part to the refusal of the ministerial bureaucracy to obey Kapp's orders. The Reichswehr, however, proved itself to be unreliable. It adopted a wait-and-see attitude under General von Seeckt, the head of the Troop Office, who said that "Reichswehr do not fire on Reichswehr".

Some among the working class did not limit themselves to passive resistance to the Kapp Putsch. Especially in the Ruhr, where dissatisfaction with the lack of nationalization of key industries was particularly high, councils were formed that sought to seize local power. In the Ruhr uprising, civil war-like fighting broke out when the Ruhr Red Army, made up of some 50,000 armed workers, mostly adherents of the KPD and USPD, used the disruption caused by the general strike to take control of the industrial district. After bloody battles in which an estimated 1,000 insurgents and 200 soldiers died, Reichswehr and Freikorps units suppressed the revolt in early April.

In Bavaria, the Kapp Putsch led to an anti-republican government reshuffle that made the Free State a so-called "cell of order" (Ordnungszelle) within the Weimar state and a rallying point for right-wing conservative and reactionary forces. The unstable political conditions in the early phase of the Weimar Republic were also evident in the Reichstag election of 1920, in which the centre-left Weimar Coalition, which until then had had a three-quarters majority, lost 125 seats to parties on both the left and right.

==== Political assassinations ====
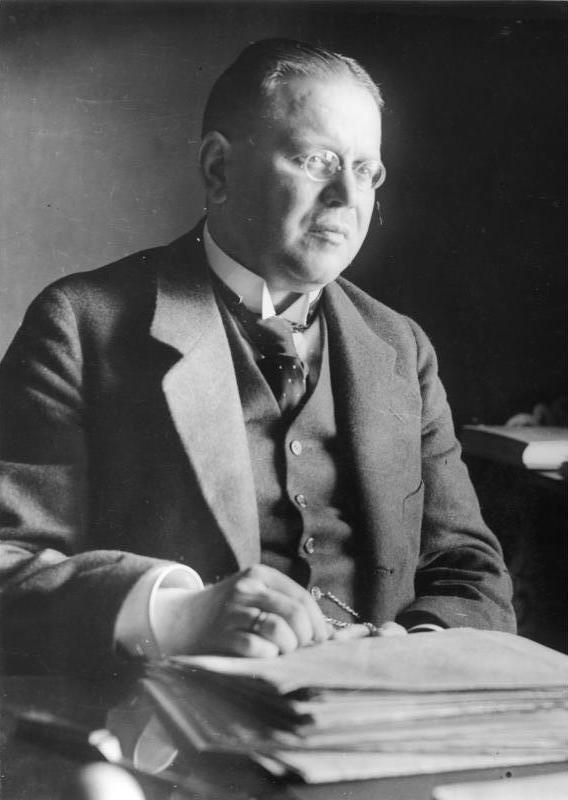
Matthias Erzberger, one of the signers of the 1918 armistice, was assassinated in 1921.

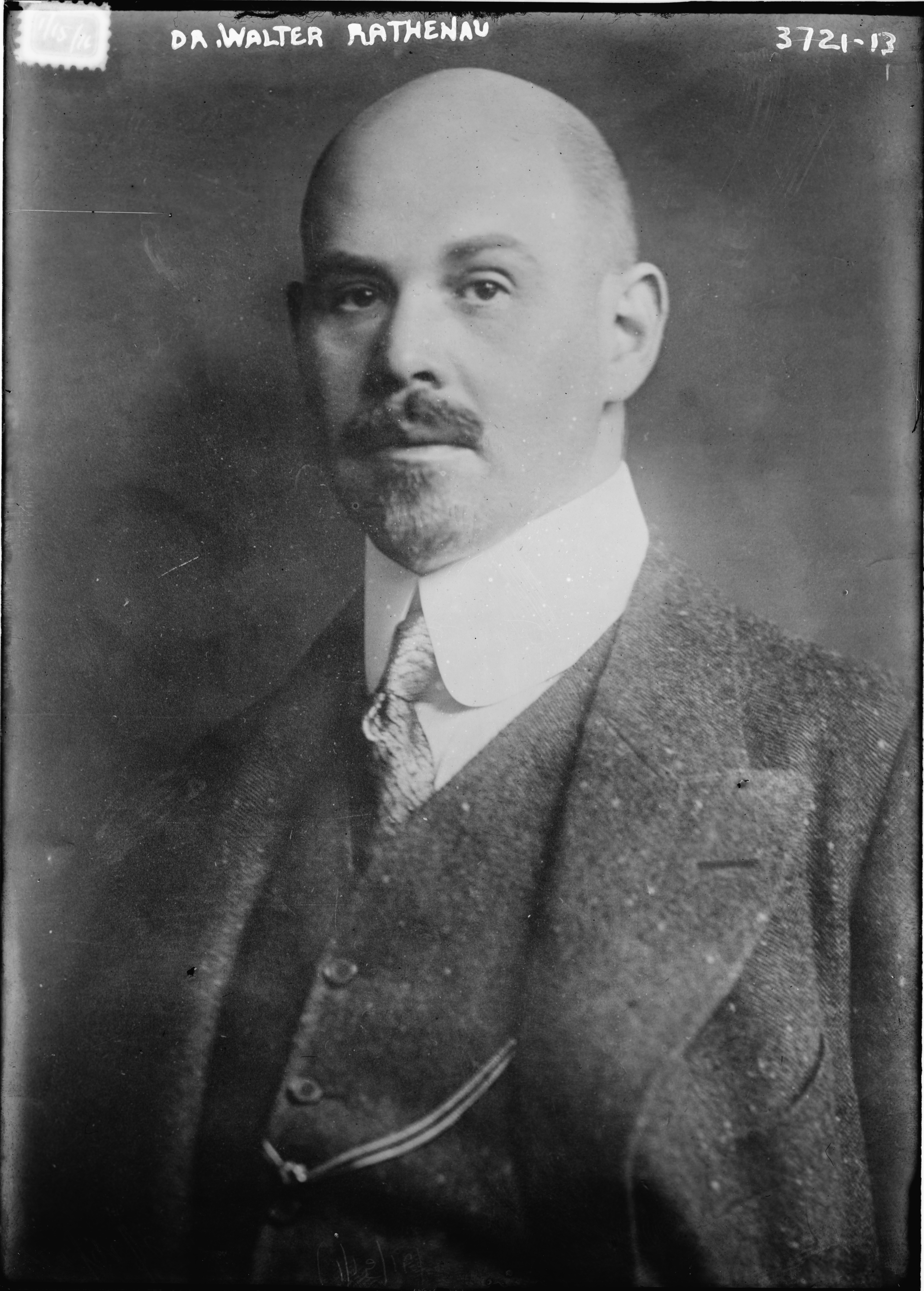
Walther Rathenau, German Foreign Minister, was assassinated in 1922.

The sharp political polarization that had occurred was visible in the assassinations of important representatives of the Republic by members of the right-wing extremist Organisation Consul. Finance Minister Matthias Erzberger was assassinated in August 1921 and Foreign Minister Walther Rathenau in June 1922. Both men had been defamed as compliant to Germany's former enemies in the matter of reparations payments. Erzberger was also attacked for signing the armistice agreement in 1918, and Rathenau had sought to break Germany's external isolation after the First World War through the Treaty of Rapallo, which opened diplomatic relations with the new Soviet Union, renounced all war claims and mutually cancelled pre-war debts. Rathenau also attracted right-wing extremist hatred because he was a Jew. The passing of the Law for the Protection of the Republic, which increased the punishments for politically motivated acts of violence, established a special court for the protection of the Republic and prohibited organizations, printed material and rallies that opposed the constitutional republican form of government, was intended to put a stop to the Republic's right-wing enemies. The conservative judiciary from the imperial era that still remained in place and passed lenient sentences against right-wing state criminals contributed to the fact that their activities could not be permanently deterred.

==== Reparations and the occupation of the Ruhr ====
After a series of international conferences to determine the reparations for which Germany was liable, an amount of 132 billion Reichsmarks was presented in May 1921, to be paid either in gold or commodities such as iron, steel and coal. Chancellor Joseph Wirth had no choice other than to accept, but in an attempt to have the amount lowered, he began the German policy of "fulfilment" (Erfüllungspolitik). By attempting to meet the payments, it intended to show the Allies that the demands were beyond Germany's economic means. In May 1922, when the Reichsmark was rapidly losing value, Germany was granted a payment moratorium over strong French objections.

In January 1923, France declared Germany in default. The French minister president Raymond Poincaré saw Germany's failure to pay reparations as a lever that he could use to achieve the separation of the Rhineland from the German Reich, a French demand that had been refused by the British at Versailles. After the Reparation Commission determined that German coal deliveries were short, French and Belgian troops marched into the Rhineland on 11 January 1923, Germany's most productive industrial region, and took control of most of its mining and manufacturing companies. The German government under Chancellor Wilhelm Cuno responded with a policy of non-violent passive resistance to the occupation. It underwrote the costs of idled factories and mines and paid the workers who were on strike. Unable to meet the enormous costs by any other means, it resorted to printing money. Along with the debts the state had incurred during the war, it was one of the major causes of the hyperinflation that followed.

Realizing that continuing the course was untenable, the new Reich Chancellor Gustav Stresemann called off the passive resistance in September 1923. The French and Belgian occupation ended in August 1925, following an agreement (the Dawes Plan) to restructure Germany's payments. The total reparations payout from 1920 to 1931 (when payments were suspended indefinitely) was 23 billion marks. 12.5 billion was cash that came mostly from loans provided by New York bankers. The rest was goods such as coal and chemicals, or from assets like railway equipment.

==== Hyperinflation ====
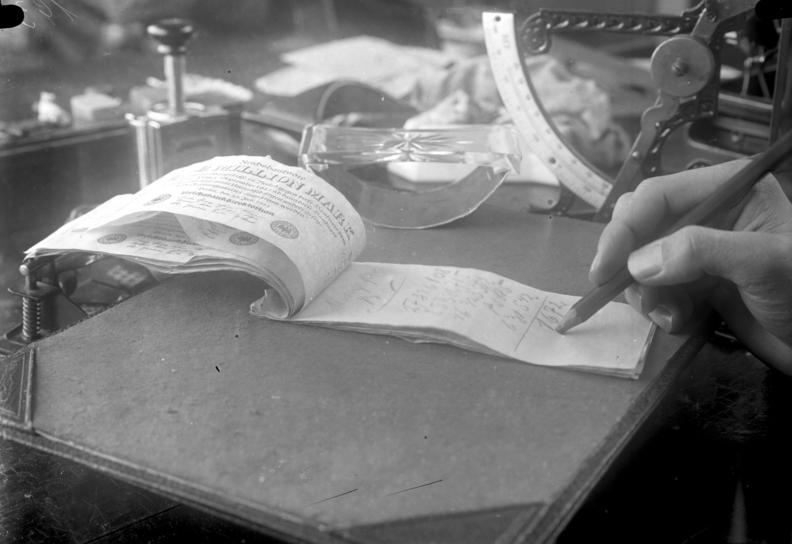
Million mark notes being used as a scratch pad

The hyperinflation fueled by the government's response to the occupation of the Ruhr caused the cost of a loaf of bread to rise from 3 Reichsmarks in 1922 to 80 billion Reichsmarks in November 1923. Prices were rising so rapidly that people rushed to spend their pay at lunch breaks before it lost any more of its value. Foreign trade became all but impossible, as did German ability to pay reparations. While personal savings became virtually worthless, so did fixed debts. Middle class owners of land or houses often came out ahead because their debts lost value along with the currency. Large industrial concerns profited in the same manner, and wealth concentrated in fewer hands. The classic example was Hugo Stinnes, who earned the title of Inflation King by taking advantage of its effects on debt to amass controlling interests in 1,535 businesses with 2,890 different plants by 1924. Stinnes' empire collapsed after the government-sponsored inflation was stopped by the introduction of the Rentenmark on 15 November 1923. One US dollar was equivalent to 4.20 Rentenmarks; the exchange rate was 1 Rentenmark to one trillion paper marks. The new money was backed by the Reich's gold reserves along with a 3.2 billion Rentenmark mortgage on the land holdings of agriculture, industry and trade. The introduction of the Rentenmark was successful at stabilizing German currency and the economy.

==== Additional political violence and the Hitler putsch ====
With the proclamation on 21 October 1923 of the Rhenish Republic came a short-lived secessionist movement in the wake of which sections of the labor force became increasingly radicalized. In Saxony and Thuringia, the Communist Party (KPD) won enough seats to participate in governments under Social Democratic minister-presidents. In Saxony the Communists were expelled by a Reich execution (Reichsexekution) using Article 48 of the Weimar Constitution, while in Thuringia the KPD ministers resigned voluntarily. In the Reichstag, the Social Democrats withdrew their support from Cuno's government and entered a grand coalition under DVP Chancellor Gustav Stresemann.

The nationalist right, especially in Bavaria, branded the breaking off of the Ruhr resistance as treason. In a breach of the Weimar constitution, Bavaria declared a state of emergency, and executive power was transferred to Gustav Ritter von Kahr as state commissioner general. The Reichswehr under the Chief of Army Command, General Hans von Seeckt, who had his own governmental ambitions directed against left-wing parties and Weimar parliamentary, behaved loyally towards the Stresemann government only with respect to his own interests. In spite of the moves against the governments in Saxony and Thuringia, no action was taken against Bavaria, where Kahr was preparing a military coup aimed at overthrowing the Reich government in cooperation with the Bavarian military under district commander Otto von Lossow.

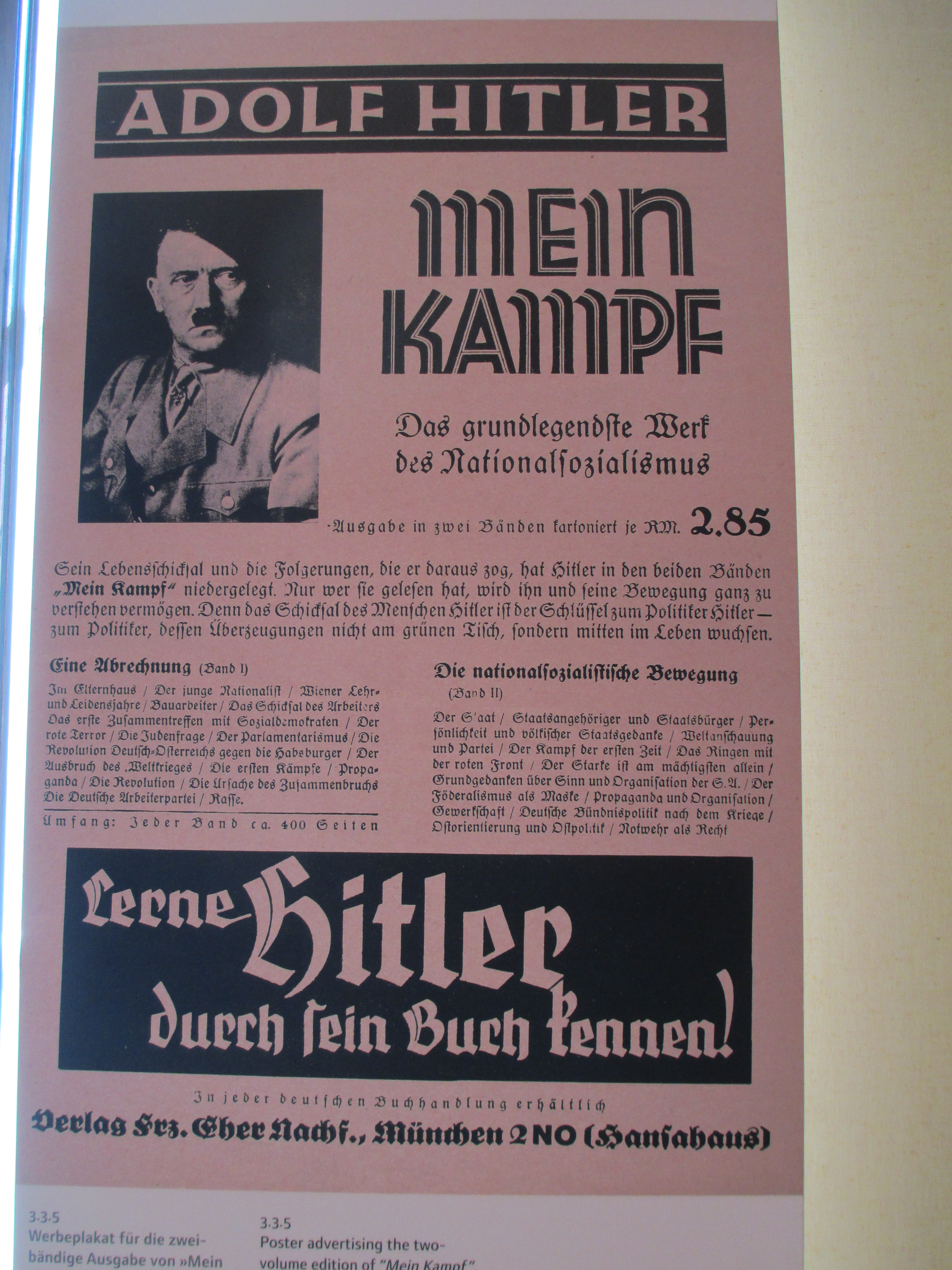
Poster promoting Hitler's Mein Kampf in two paperback volumes for 2.85 Reichsmarks each

In 1920, the German Workers' Party had become the National Socialist German Workers' Party (NSDAP), or Nazi Party, which would eventually become a driving force in the collapse of the Weimar Republic. Adolf Hitler named himself chairman of the party in July 1921. On 8 November 1923, in a pact with Erich Ludendorff, a league of nationalist fighting societies called the Kampfbund, took over a meeting that Kahr and Lossow were holding at a beer hall in Munich. Ludendorff and Hitler declared that the Weimar government was deposed and that they were planning to take control of Munich the following day. Kahr and Lossow organized the resistance to Hitler, with the result that the coup attempt was easily stopped. Hitler was arrested and sentenced to five years in prison for high treason, the minimum sentence for the charge. He served less than eight months in a comfortable cell, receiving a daily stream of visitors until his release on 20 December 1924. While in jail Hitler dictated Mein Kampf, which laid out his ideas and future policies. Hitler decided to focus in the future on legal methods of gaining power.

=== Golden Era (1924–1929) ===
From 1924 to 1929, the Weimar Republic was relatively stable. Known in Germany as the "Goldene Zwanziger" (Golden Twenties), its prominent features were internal consolidation and rapprochement in foreign affairs, along with a growing economy and a consequent decrease in civil unrest, although the improvements came about without establishing a sustainable foundation for the parliamentary democracy. While Germany's recognition of its reparations obligations promoted reintegration into the contemporary state system and world markets, it also developed a strong dependence on American capital. The stability was partly borrowed and, in the end, only superficial.

==== Framework for economic policy ====
An essential basis for the relative stabilization was the restructuring of reparations through the Dawes Plan. Without fixing a final total sum, the plan regulated the scope, composition and the security of transfers for future annual reparations payments. The latter was to be guaranteed by the American financial expert Parker Gilbert who, as reparations agent, could directly influence German fiscal and financial policy in order to secure monetary stability. The acceptance of the Dawes Plan in the Reichstag had long been uncertain – parts of the Right spoke of a "new enslavement of the German people" and the KPD of the enslavement of the German proletariat. Once the plan had been passed, it brought the Weimar Republic a significant inflow of American loans from state funds as well as private investors. The money served as both start-up financing for reparations and as aid for an economic revival. German railways, the National Bank and many industries were mortgaged as security for the loans.

The economic consolidation that occurred after the period of hyperinflation was largely at the expense of wage earners and the economic middle class. The eight-hour day, one of the main social achievements of the 1918/19 revolution, was in many cases watered down or abandoned; the civil service was affected by massive job cuts and salary reductions; and rationalization and concentration in large industries continued and deprived many small and medium-sized enterprises of their livelihoods. Savers and creditors who had been hurt by inflation were effectively left without any significant compensation. Real wages, however, grew faster than the cost of living between 1924 and 1929. One study found that by 1928–29 they "had reached or exceeded their pre-war level".

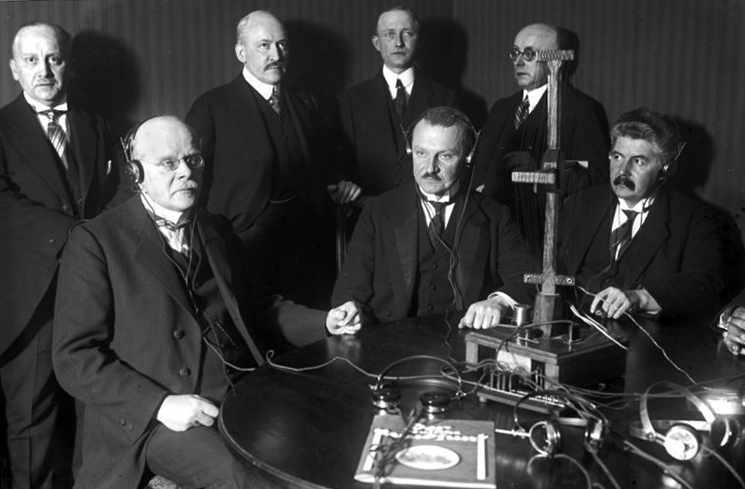
Chancellor Wilhelm Marx's Christmas broadcast, December 1923

The declarations of social guarantees contained in the Weimar Constitution had only a limited effect and stood in striking contrast to the many experiences of social decline. From 1924 onwards, small savers who had been impoverished or economically ruined by inflation were at least able to take advantage of the state-organized social welfare system, which replaced the former poor relief. The new system, however, was characterized by "petty means tests under an anonymous social bureaucracy" and by benefits that only secured existence at a subsistence level. In the brief peak phase of overall economic recovery and economic optimism, unemployment insurance was introduced in 1927. In some respects it was the "high point of the Republic's social expansion", although it benefitted only a portion of the workforce and did not cover permanent unemployment. In the meantime, the state had also introduced a new system of social security.

The parliamentary system of Weimar democracy was the expression of a party landscape that was strongly characterized and fragmented by class and social milieus. Reichstag members as representatives of the interests of their respective electorates often had narrow limits to their willingness to compromise. Such class and status consciousness was part of the legacy of the imperial era and continued to have an effect, although it was also partly reshaped by a consumer and leisure mass culture that emerged in the 1920s and was driven by the new media forms of records, film and radio. People of all classes and strata went to the cinema or sat in front of the radio. Mass culture pointed in the direction of democratisation and was interpreted by conservatives as intellectual flattening and a decline in values. The class fronts were gradually softened by mass culture, marking a "class society in transition".

==== Unstable political system ====
After Reich President Ebert died at the beginning of 1925 at the age of 54, the candidate of the parties that supported the Republic, Wilhelm Marx of the Centre Party, was defeated in the second round of the 1925 Reich presidential election by the candidate of the nationalist right, Paul von Hindenburg, 48.3% to 45.3%. Despite the fact that Hindenburg had declared in advance that he intended to hold office in accordance with the Weimar Constitution, his electoral success showed how far the country had shifted to the right since Weimar's beginnings with a socialist president.

The Reichstag elections in May 1924 and December 1924 were once again failures for the Weimar Coalition (SDP, DDP and Centre), which had started so comfortably in 1919 and which maintained its position as a "bulwark of democracy" only in Prussia. In the May election, the Coalition partners lost a total of 13 seats, while the right wing DNVP and left wing KPD picked up 82 seats. After the SPD left Gustav Stresemann's cabinet in November 1923 in protest of its actions against Saxony and Thuringia, it did not take part in a government again until June 1928. From 1924 to 1929, there were three chancellors: Wilhelm Marx of the Centre party (twice), the non-partisan Hans Luther and Hermann Müller of the SPD. Altogether there were seven cabinets under the three men.

==== Foreign policy ====
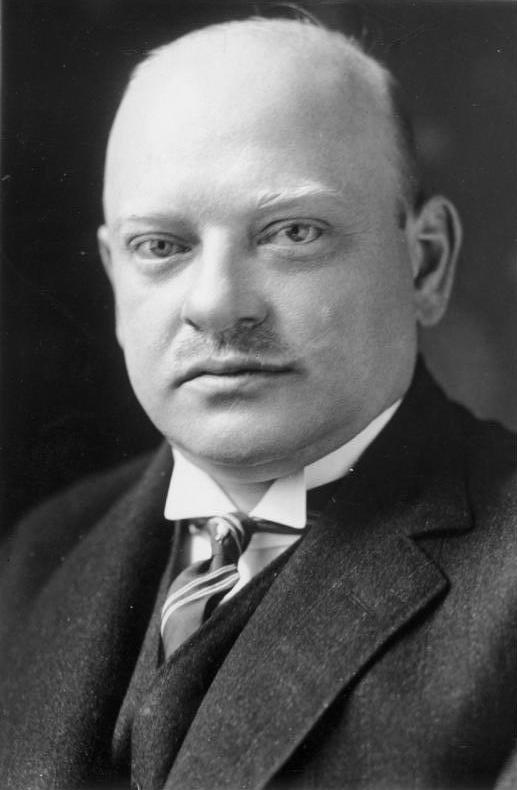
Gustav Stresemann, who was Reich chancellor in 1923 and foreign minister from 1923 until his death in 1929

Despite the frequent changes of personnel in the Reich chancellery and in the government cabinets between 1923 and 1928, there was nevertheless an effective constant in Foreign Minister Gustav Stresemann of the German People's Party. With his change from "monarchist of the heart" to "republican of reason", as he himself expressed it, Stresemann exercised a stabilizing influence on the political development of the Republic not only as Reich chancellor in 1923 but throughout the entire period of his participation in government.

He sought a release from the restraints of the Treaty of Versailles exclusively by peaceful means and through mutual understanding, although without abandoning long-term revisionist intentions such as regaining the territory ceded to Poland. He took the initiative for the 1925 Locarno Treaties, which settled Germany's western borders but left the issue of the eastern ones open. Through reaching an understanding with France and securing Germany an equal position in the League of Nations in 1926, he led the Weimar Republic out of isolation. Germany signed arbitration conventions with France and Belgium and arbitration treaties with Poland and Czechoslovakia, undertaking to refer any future disputes to an arbitration tribunal or to the Permanent Court of International Justice. As a result of the Dawes Plan, foreign troops left the Ruhr in 1925. In addition, the 1926 Treaty of Berlin ensured that relations with the Soviet Union remained unencumbered. Beginning in 1925 there was secret and illegal cooperation between the Reichswehr and the Red Army. Germany tested weapons in the Soviet Union that had been banned by the Treaty of Versailles, including aircraft, tanks and poison gas.

The favourable effects expected from the Locarno Treaties were to a certain extent realized. The first Rhineland zone was vacated in 1925, Franco-German economic relations were expanded through agreements, and the Military Inter-Allied Commission of Control, which monitored German disarmament, left Germany in 1927. In 1928 Stresemann played an important mediating role between the US and France in the negotiations on the Kellogg–Briand Pact, an international agreement on peace.

After the full reparations schedule under the Dawes Plan was drawn up in 1928/29, new negotiations took place. In the resulting Young Plan, the question of possible relief was combined with a plan for the final settlement of the reparations question. Instead of the annual payment of 2.5 billion Reichsmarks envisaged in the Dawes Plan, an average of 2 billion – initially 1.7 billion – was to be paid over a period of 59 years. With the prospect of what was thought to be a final reparations plan, and in view of Germany's willingness to accept the liability until 1988, France in parallel negotiations conceded a withdrawal of troops from the occupied Rhineland five years earlier than under the Versailles Treaty. For the nationalist right in Germany, it was above all the reparations burden extending across generations that provided propaganda fuel for their agitation against the Weimar Republic. The DNVP and Nazi Party carried out a referendum against the Young Plan, which failed by a large margin due to the low turnout, but through it the National Socialists were able to use their propaganda to draw nationwide attention to themselves and to make their mark on the right-wing fringe of the party spectrum.

=== Culture ===
The 1920s saw a remarkable cultural renaissance in Germany. During the worst phase of hyperinflation in 1923, the clubs and bars were full of speculators who spent their daily profits so they would not lose the value the following day. Berlin intellectuals responded by condemning what they considered the excesses of capitalism and demanding revolutionary changes on the cultural scenery.

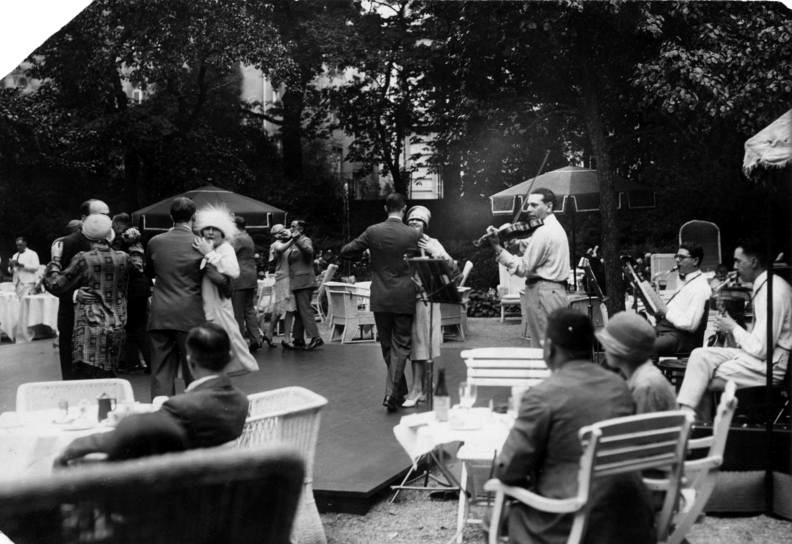
The "Golden Twenties" in Berlin: a jazz band plays for a tea dance at the hotel Esplanade, 1926.

Influenced by the cultural explosion in the Soviet Union, German literature, cinema, theatre and musical works entered a phase of great creativity. Innovative street theatre brought plays to the public, and the cabaret scene and jazz bands became very popular. According to the cliché, modern young women were Americanized, wearing makeup, short hair, smoking and breaking with traditional mores. The euphoria surrounding Josephine Baker in the metropolis of Berlin for instance, where she was declared an "erotic goddess" and in many ways admired and respected, kindled further "ultramodern" sensations in the minds of the German public. Art and a new type of architecture taught at "Bauhaus" schools reflected the new ideas of the time, with artists such as George Grosz being fined for defaming the military and for blasphemy.

The Elephant Celebes by Max Ernst (1921)

Artists in Berlin were influenced by other contemporary progressive cultural movements, such as the Impressionist and Expressionist painters in Paris, as well as the Cubists. Likewise, American progressive architects were admired. Many of the new buildings built during this era followed a straight-lined, geometrical style. Examples of the new architecture include the Bauhaus Building by Gropius, Grosses Schauspielhaus, and the Einstein Tower.

Not everyone, however, was happy with the changes taking place in Weimar culture. Conservatives and reactionaries feared that Germany was betraying its traditional values by adopting popular styles from abroad, particularly those Hollywood was popularizing in American films, while New York became the global capital of fashion.

In 1929, three years after receiving the 1926 Nobel Peace Prize, Stresemann died of a heart attack at age 51. When the New York Stock Exchange crashed in October 1929, American loans dried up and the sharp decline of the German economy brought the "Golden Twenties" to an abrupt end.

=== Athletics ===
Initially after the First World War, Germany did not participate in the Olympic Games. Instead it hosted its own National Games which were similar to the Olympic Games. In 1928 Germany accepted the Netherlands' invitation to participate in the 1928 Summer Olympics Games in Amsterdam. Germany also participated in the 1932 Summer Olympics Games held in Los Angeles.

Another athletic championship Germany participated in was the Women's World Games with athletes being sent to the 1926 Games and the 1930 Games. Germany won first place in 1930.

=== Religion ===
A map showing religious affiliations according to the 1925 Census.

Under the Weimar Constitution, Germany was secular. It was predominantly Protestant, with 64.1% adhering in 1925 and 62.7% in 1933. The other sizeable religion was Roman Catholicism, which made up 32.4% of the population in 1925 and 32.5% in 1933. Those who were not Christian were a minority, with 3.5% hailing from other religions in 1925 and 4.8% in 1933. Jews made up 0.9% of the population in 1925 and 0.8% in 1933.

=== Social policy under Weimar ===
A wide range of progressive social reforms were carried out during and after the revolutionary period. The Executive Council of the Workers' and Soldiers' Councils – a coalition that included Majority Social Democrats, Independent Social Democrats, workers and soldiers – introduced the eight-hour work day, reinstated demobilized workers, released political prisoners, abolished press censorship, increased workers' old-age, sick and unemployment benefits, and gave labor the unrestricted right to organize into unions. It was made harder for estates to sack workers and prevent them from leaving when they wanted to. Under the Provisional Act for Agricultural Labour of 23 November 1918, the normal period of notice for management and most resident laborer was set at six weeks. In addition, a supplementary directive of December 1918 specified that female and child workers were entitled to a fifteen-minute break if they worked between four and six hours, thirty minutes for workdays lasting six to eight hours, and one hour for longer days. A decree on 23 December 1918 established committees (composed of workers' representatives "in their relation to the employer") to safeguard the rights of workers. The right to bargain collectively was also established, while it was made obligatory "to elect workers' committees on estates and establish conciliation committees". A decree on 3 February 1919 removed the right of employers to acquire exemption for domestic servants and agricultural workers. In 1919, legislation provided for a maximum working 48-hour workweek, restrictions on night work, a half-holiday on Saturday, and a break of thirty-six hours of continuous rest during the week.

With the decree of 3 February 1919, the Ebert government reintroduced the original structure of the health insurance boards according to an 1883 law, with one-third employers and two-thirds workers. As of 28 June 1919, health insurance committees were elected by the workers themselves. That same year, health insurance was extended to wives and daughters without their own income, people only partially capable of gainful employment, people employed in private cooperatives, and people employed in public cooperatives.

The Provisional Order of January 1919 concerning agricultural labor conditions fixed 2,900 hours as a maximum per year, distributed as eight, ten, and eleven hours per day in four-month periods. A code of January 1919 bestowed on land laborer the same legal rights that industrial workers enjoyed, while a bill ratified the same year obligated the states to set up agricultural settlement associations which "were endowed with the priority right of purchase of farms beyond a specified size". In October 1919, a law was enacted that provided various kinds of financial support in relation to pregnancy, childbirth, confinement compensation, and maternity care. That same year, free legal representation to the poor was introduced.

A series of progressive tax reforms were introduced under the auspices of Matthias Erzberger, including increases in taxes on capital and an increase in the highest income tax rate from 4% to 60%. Under a governmental decree of 3 February 1919, the German government met the demand of the veterans' associations that all aid for the disabled and their dependents be taken over by the central government (thus assuming responsibility for this assistance) and extended into peacetime the nationwide network of state and district welfare bureaus that had been set up during the war to coordinate social services for war widows and orphans.

The Youth Welfare Act of 1922 obliged all municipalities and states to set up youth offices in charge of child protection, and also codified a right to education for all children, while laws were passed to regulate rents and increase protection for tenants in 1922 and 1923. Health insurance coverage was extended to other categories of the population during the existence of the Weimar Republic, including seamen, people employed in the educational and social welfare sectors, and all primary dependents. Various improvements were also made in unemployment benefits, although in June 1920 the maximum amount of unemployment benefit that a family of four could receive in Berlin, 90 marks, was well below the minimum cost of subsistence of 304 marks.

In 1923, unemployment relief was consolidated into a regular programme of assistance following economic problems that year. In 1924, a modern public assistance programme was introduced, and in 1925 the accident insurance programme was reformed, allowing diseases that were linked to certain kinds of work to become insurable risks. Other amendments to accident insurance in 1925 also introduced rehabilitation benefits, together with benefits for the dependent children of permanently disabled workers whose earning capacity had fallen by at least 50%. In addition, paid maternity leave and a national unemployment insurance programme were both introduced in 1927. Housing construction was also greatly accelerated during the Weimar period, with over 2 million new homes constructed between 1924 and 1931 and a further 195,000 modernized.

The Weimar years witnessed a major rise in overall public spending, which grew to an annual average of 13.7 billion Marks (in 1913 prices) from 1919 to 1929, compared with 6.8 billion Marks from 1909 to 1913. Government expenditure as a proportion of GNP also rose; standing at 25% in 1925, 30.6% in 1929, and 36.6% in 1932. According to one study, "This expansion was first and foremost a consequence of "social interventionism," the chief manifestation of which, apart from house building and job creation measures during the crisis of 1925–26, was the extension of social insurance."

=== Renewed crisis and decline (1930–1933) ===
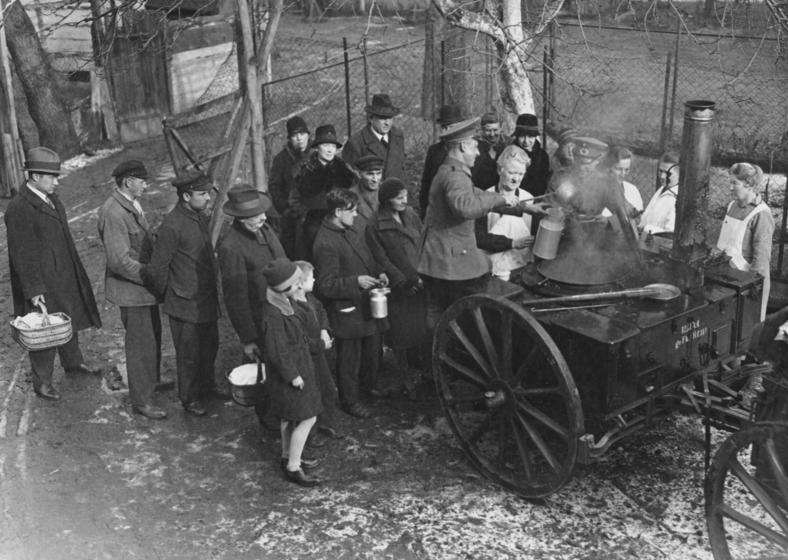
Troops of the German Army feeding the poor in Berlin, 1931

==== Onset of the Great Depression ====
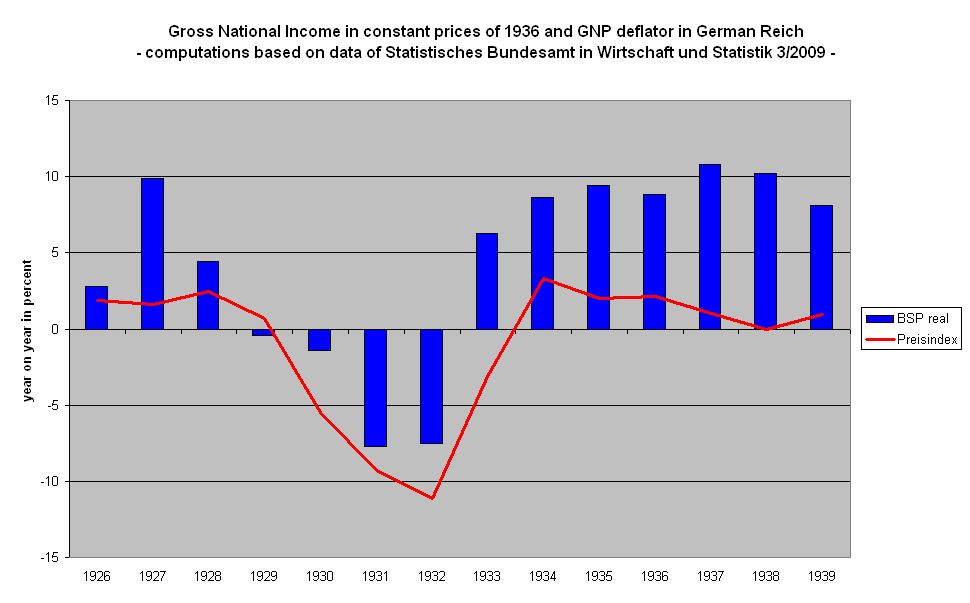
Gross national product (inflation adjusted) and price index in Germany, 1926–1936. The period between 1930 and 1932 is marked by severe deflation and recession.

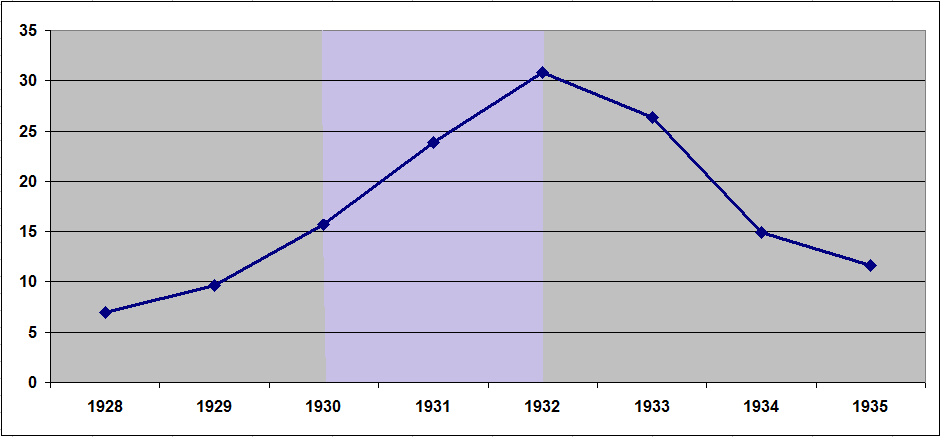
Unemployment rate in Germany between 1928 and 1935. During Brüning's policy of deflation (marked in purple), the unemployment rate soared from 15.7% in 1930 to 30.8% in 1932.

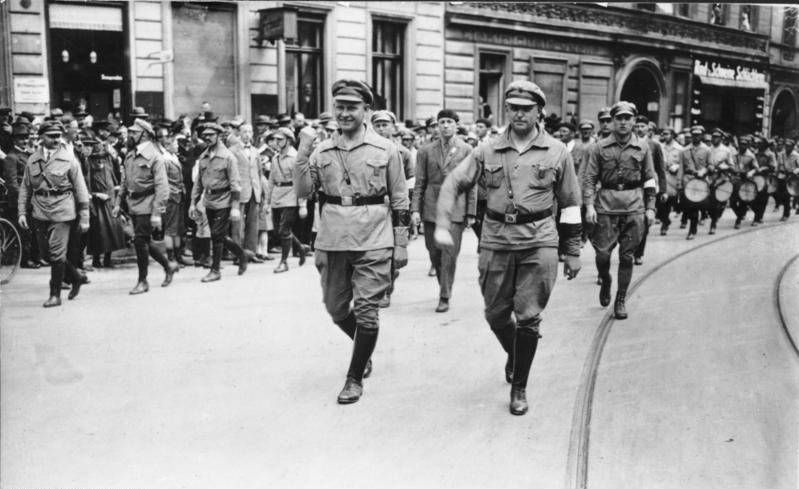
Communist Party (KPD) leader Ernst Thälmann (person in foreground with raised clenched fist) and members of the Roter Frontkämpferbund (RFB) marching through Berlin-Wedding, 1927

In 1929, the onset of the Great Depression produced a severe economic shock in Germany which was made worse by the European banking crisis of 1931. Germany's fragile economy had been sustained by the granting of loans through the Dawes Plan (1924) and the Young Plan (1929). When American banks withdrew their line of credit to German companies, the rapid rise in unemployment could not be checked by conventional economic measures. Unemployment thereafter grew dramatically, to 4 million in 1930, and in the Reichstag election of September 1930, the National Socialist German Workers' Party (NSDAP, Nazi Party), until then a minor far-right party, increased its share of the votes to 19%, becoming Germany's second largest party, while the Communist Party of Germany (KPD) gained 23 seats. The shift to the political extremes made the unstable coalition system by which every Weimar chancellor had governed increasingly unworkable. The last years of the Weimar Republic were marred by even more systemic political instability than previous years, and political violence increased. Four chancellors (Heinrich Brüning, Franz von Papen, Kurt von Schleicher and, from 30 January to 23 March 1933, Adolf Hitler) governed through presidential decree rather than parliamentary consultation. It effectively rendered parliament powerless as a means of enforcing constitutional checks and balances.

==== Brüning and the first presidential cabinet (1930–1932) ====
On 29 March 1930, at the instigation of General Kurt von Schleicher, President Paul von Hindenburg appointed finance expert Heinrich Brüning as successor to Hermann Müller (SPD), whose five-party coalition had broken down on 27 March over how to finance the increased costs of unemployment compensation. The new government was expected to lead a political shift towards conservatism.

As Brüning had no majority support in the Reichstag, he became, through the use of the emergency powers granted to the Reich president by Article 48 of the constitution, the first Weimar chancellor to operate independently of parliament. After a bill to reform Germany's finances was opposed by the Reichstag, it was made into an emergency decree by Hindenburg. On 18 July, as a result of opposition from the SPD, KPD, DNVP and the small contingent of NSDAP members, the Reichstag again rejected the bill by a slim margin. Immediately afterward, Brüning submitted a decree from the President to dissolve the Reichstag. The consequent general election on 14 September resulted in an enormous political shift within the Reichstag: 18.3% of the vote went to the NSDAP, five times the percentage it had won in 1928. As a result, it was no longer possible, even with a grand coalition, to form a pro-republican majority that excluded the KPD, DNVP and NSDAP. The situation led an increase in the number of public demonstrations and instances of paramilitary violence organized by the NSDAP.

Between 1930 and 1932, Brüning enacted a policy of austerity including drastic cuts in state expenditures, tax increases, mandated wage reductions in both the public and private sectors, and credit restrictions. Among other measures, he completely halted all obligatory public payments to the unemployment insurance program introduced in 1927, resulting in higher contributions from the workers and fewer benefits for the unemployed. Benefits for the sick, invalids and pensioners were also sharply reduced. Since the Young Plan did not allow the Reichsmark to be devalued, he triggered an internal devaluation by forcing the economy to reduce prices, rents, salaries and wages by 20%.

By late 1931, Hindenburg and Schleicher had begun to contemplate dropping Brüning in favor of accommodating Alfred Hugenberg of the DNVP and Adolf Hitler. On 30 May 1932, Brüning finally lost Hindenburg's support over the question of Eastern Aid and resigned as chancellor.

The consensus today is that Brüning's policies exacerbated the German economic crisis and the population's growing frustration with democracy, contributing considerably to the increase in support for Hitler's NSDAP.

==== Papen cabinet ====
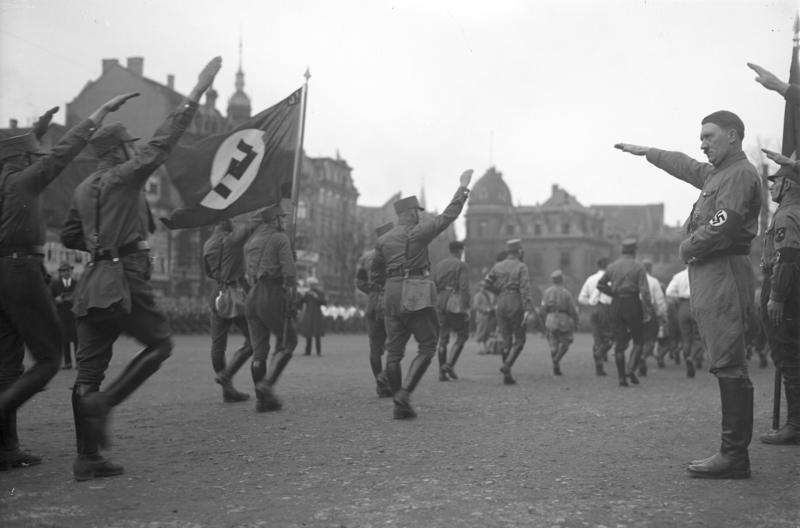
Nazi Party (NSDAP) leader Adolf Hitler saluting members of the Sturmabteilung in Brunswick, Lower Saxony, 1932

Hindenburg then appointed Franz von Papen as the new chancellor. He was closely associated with the industrialist and land-owning classes and the military. General Kurt von Schleicher – who became Reichswehr minister – handpicked the members of the Papen cabinet, which came to be known as the "Cabinet of Barons". It continued to govern by presidential decree as had the Brüning cabinets.

On 16 June, Papen lifted the ban on the Nazi Sturmabteilung (SA) and Schutzstaffel (SS) that had been imposed on 13 April under the Brüning government. Using the political violence that took place during the Reichstag election campaign as a pretext, he ousted the SPD-led coalition government of Prussia in the Prussian coup d'état (Preußenschlag) of 20 July. By emergency decree, he declared himself Reich Commissioner (Reichskommissar) of Prussia, a step that further weakened the democracy of the Weimar Republic.

==== Election of July 1932 ====
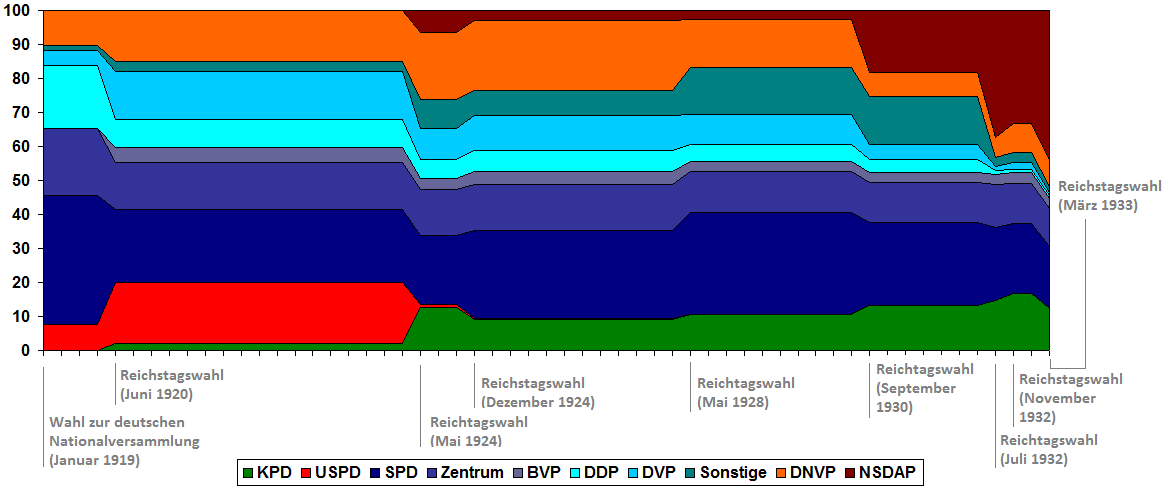
Chart of federal election results 1919–1933, with right-wing parties at the top and left-wing at the bottom, showing the collapse of the centrist and right of centre parties as the Nazi Party (brown) increased in strength. (Note: Sonstige means 'Others'.)

Per a prior agreement with Hindenburg and Hitler, Papen dissolved the Reichstag on 4 June 1932 and called for a new election in the hope that the Nazi Party would win the most seats and allow him to set up an authoritarian government. The general election on 31 July 1932 yielded major gains for the Communist Party and the Nazis, who won 37.3% of the vote, their high-water mark in a free election. The Nazi party supplanted the Social Democrats as the largest party in the Reichstag, although it did not gain a majority.

The immediate question was what part the Nazi Party would play in the government of the country. Hitler refused a ministry under Papen and demanded the chancellorship for himself but was rejected by Hindenburg on 13 August 1932. Since there was still no majority in the Reichstag for any government, the Reichstag was again dissolved, and an election was scheduled in the hope that a stable majority would result.

==== Schleicher cabinet ====
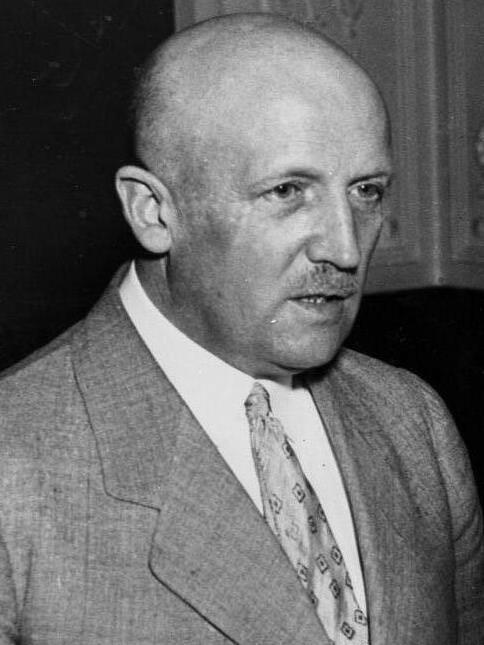
Kurt von Schleicher, the last chancellor of the Weimar Republic before Hitler

In the 6 November 1932 election, the Nazis received two million fewer votes than in the previous election. Kurt von Schleicher, a retired army general who for many years had worked politically behind the scenes to further the interests of Germany's military, maneuvered Papen out of office and was appointed chancellor by Hindenburg on 3 December. He tried to cause a split within the Nazi Party that would force Hitler to support his government but failed in the attempt.

One of the main initiatives of Schleicher's government was a public works program intended to counter the effects of the Great Depression. The various projects, which are often wrongly attributed to Hitler, created 2 million jobs for unemployed Germans by July 1933. In foreign policy, Schleicher's main interest was in winning Gleichberechtigung ("equality of status") for Germany at the World Disarmament Conference by doing away with Part V of the Treaty of Versailles, which had disarmed Germany.

Schleicher's relations with his cabinet were poor because of his secretiveness and open contempt for his ministers. Papen had become Schleicher's bitter enemy when he was forced out of office but retained Hindenburg's confidence. He advised him to sack Schleicher and appoint Hitler chancellor in a coalition with the German National People's Party (DNVP) which, together with Papen, would work to rein in Hitler. On 28 January 1933, Schleicher told his cabinet that he needed a decree from the President to dissolve the Reichstag in order to keep his government from being defeated in a no-confidence vote, but Hindenburg refused the request.

Knowing that his government was about to fall and fearing that Papen would get the chancellorship, Schleicher began to favor Hitler. Hitler was initially willing to support Schleicher as his minister of Defense but was convinced by an associate of Schleicher that he was about to launch a putsch to keep Hitler out of power. Amid rumors that Schleicher was moving troops into Berlin to depose Hindenburg, Papen convinced him to appoint Hitler chancellor. The President dismissed Schleicher and appointed Hitler on 30 January 1933.

=== End of the Weimar Republic ===
==== Hitler's chancellorship (1933) ====
Hitler was sworn in as chancellor on the morning of 30 January 1933. By early February, the government had begun to clamp down on the opposition. Meetings of the left-wing parties were banned and even some of the moderate parties found their members threatened and assaulted. Measures with an appearance of legality suppressed the Communist Party in mid-February and included the plainly illegal arrests of Reichstag deputies.

On 27 February 1933, the Reichstag was gutted by a fire which was blamed on an act of arson by Marinus van der Lubbe, a Dutch council communist. Hitler blamed the fire on the KPD (although Van der Lubbe was not a member of the party) and convinced Hindenburg to issue the Reichstag Fire Decree the following day. The decree invoked Article 48 of the Weimar Constitution and "suspended until further notice" a number of constitutional protections of civil liberties, allowing the Nazi government to take swift action against political meetings and to arrest both socialists and communists.

In the Reichstag election which took place on 5 March 1933, the NSDAP obtained 17 million votes and a scant majority of 16 seats for the NSDAP-DNVP coalition. The Communist, Social Democrat, and Catholic Centre votes changed little. It was the last multi-party election of the Weimar Republic and the last in a united Germany for 57 years.

==== Enabling Act ====
In March, Hitler submitted a proposal to the Reichstag for an enabling act that granted all legislative powers to the cabinet and by extension to Hitler. It in effect allowed Hitler's government to act without regard for the constitution. Since it formally amended the Weimar Constitution, it required a two-thirds majority to pass, which it obtained (68%) on 23 March, with only the SPD voting against (the KPD had been banned). The combined effect of the Enabling Act and the Reichstag Fire Decree transformed Hitler's government into a legal dictatorship and laid the groundwork for his totalitarian regime. Since July 1933, the NSDAP was the only legally permitted party in Germany. The Reichstag from 1933 onward effectively became the rubber stamp parliament that Hitler had desired.

The passage of the Enabling Act of 1933 is widely considered to mark the end of the Weimar Republic and the beginning of Nazi Germany. It effectively destroyed the checks and balances of the democratic system, concentrating all the power in the hands of Hitler and his inner circle. The Enabling Act played a significant role in the establishment of Hitler's dictatorship and the subsequent events that unfolded during the Nazi era.

==== Nazification ====
In the months following the passage of the Enabling Act, all German parties aside from the NSDAP were banned or forced to disband themselves, all trade unions were dissolved and all media were brought under the control of the Reich Ministry of Public Enlightenment and Propaganda. The Reichstag was then dissolved by Hindenburg and a snap one-party election was called in November 1933. It gave the NSDAP 100% of the seats in the chamber. In February 1934, the Law on the Reconstruction of the Reich abolished all state parliaments and passed state sovereignty to the Reich government.

The constitution of 1919 was never formally repealed, but the Enabling Act meant that it was a dead letter. The Reichstag was effectively eliminated as an active player in German politics. It met only sporadically until the end of World War II, held no debates and enacted only a few laws; for all purposes, it was reduced to a mere stage for Hitler's speeches. The other chamber of the German parliament (the Reichsrat) was officially abolished on 14 February 1934 by the Law on the Abolition of the Reichsrat. It was in clear violation of the Enabling Act, which stipulated (Article 2) that any laws passed under its authority could not affect the institutions of either chamber. By then, however, the Nazis had become law unto themselves, and the actions were never challenged in court.

Hindenburg's death on 2 August 1934 eliminated any remaining obstacle to full Nazi dominance. The day before he died, the Hitler cabinet passed the Law Concerning the Head of State of the German Reich, the final major part in the Nazification process called Gleichschaltung ("coordination"). It transferred the president's powers upon his death, including as Supreme Commander of the Armed Forces, to the new post of "Führer and Reich Chancellor", giving Hitler complete power over the entire Reich without any possibility of checks and balances. The action was later ratified by a highly non-democratic referendum which shed the last remains of the Weimar Republic.

== Reasons for failure ==
The reasons for the Weimar Republic's collapse are the subject of debate. It may have been doomed from the beginning since even some moderates disliked it and extremists on both the left and right loathed it, a situation often referred to as a "democracy without democrats". Germany had limited democratic traditions, and Weimar democracy was widely seen as chaotic. Since Weimar's early left of center politicians had been blamed for the Dolchstoß (stab-in-the-back), a widely believed theory that Germany's surrender in the First World War had been unnecessary and the act of traitors, the popular legitimacy of the government was shaky from the start. As normal parliamentary lawmaking broke down and was replaced around 1930 by a series of emergency decrees, the decreasing popular legitimacy of the government further drove voters to extremist parties. No single reason can explain the failure of the Weimar Republic. The most commonly asserted causes can be grouped into three categories: economic problems, institutional problems, and the roles of individuals.

=== Economic problems ===
The Weimar Republic had some of the most serious economic problems ever experienced by any Western democracy. It experienced a period of rampant hyperinflation, sometimes high unemployment, and a large drop in living standards. From 1923 to 1929, there was a period of economic recovery, but the Great Depression of the 1930s led to a worldwide recession. Germany was particularly affected because it depended heavily on American loans.

The Weimar Republic was severely affected by the Great Depression. In 1926, about two million Germans were unemployed, which rose to around six million in 1932, with many blaming the Weimar Republic. As the Weimar Republic was very fragile throughout its existence, the depression was devastating and played a major role in the Nazi takeover.

Most Germans thought the Treaty of Versailles was a punishing and degrading document because it forced them to surrender resource-rich areas and pay massive amounts of compensation. The punitive reparations caused consternation and resentment, but the actual economic damage resulting from the Treaty of Versailles is difficult to determine. While the official reparations were considerable, Germany ended up paying only a fraction of them. However, the reparations damaged Germany's economy by discouraging market loans. A number of factors came together in 1923, including printing currency to finance the costs of passive resistance to the occupation of the Ruhr, to cause rampant hyperinflation. At the beginning of 1920, one US dollar was equivalent to fifty marks. By the end of 1923, one US dollar was equal to 4,200,000,000,000 marks. Princeton historian Harold James argues that there was a clear link between economic decline and people turning to extremist politics. That was made apparent when political parties on both the far right and far left wanted to disband the Republic altogether, making any democratic majority in Parliament impossible.

=== Institutional problems ===
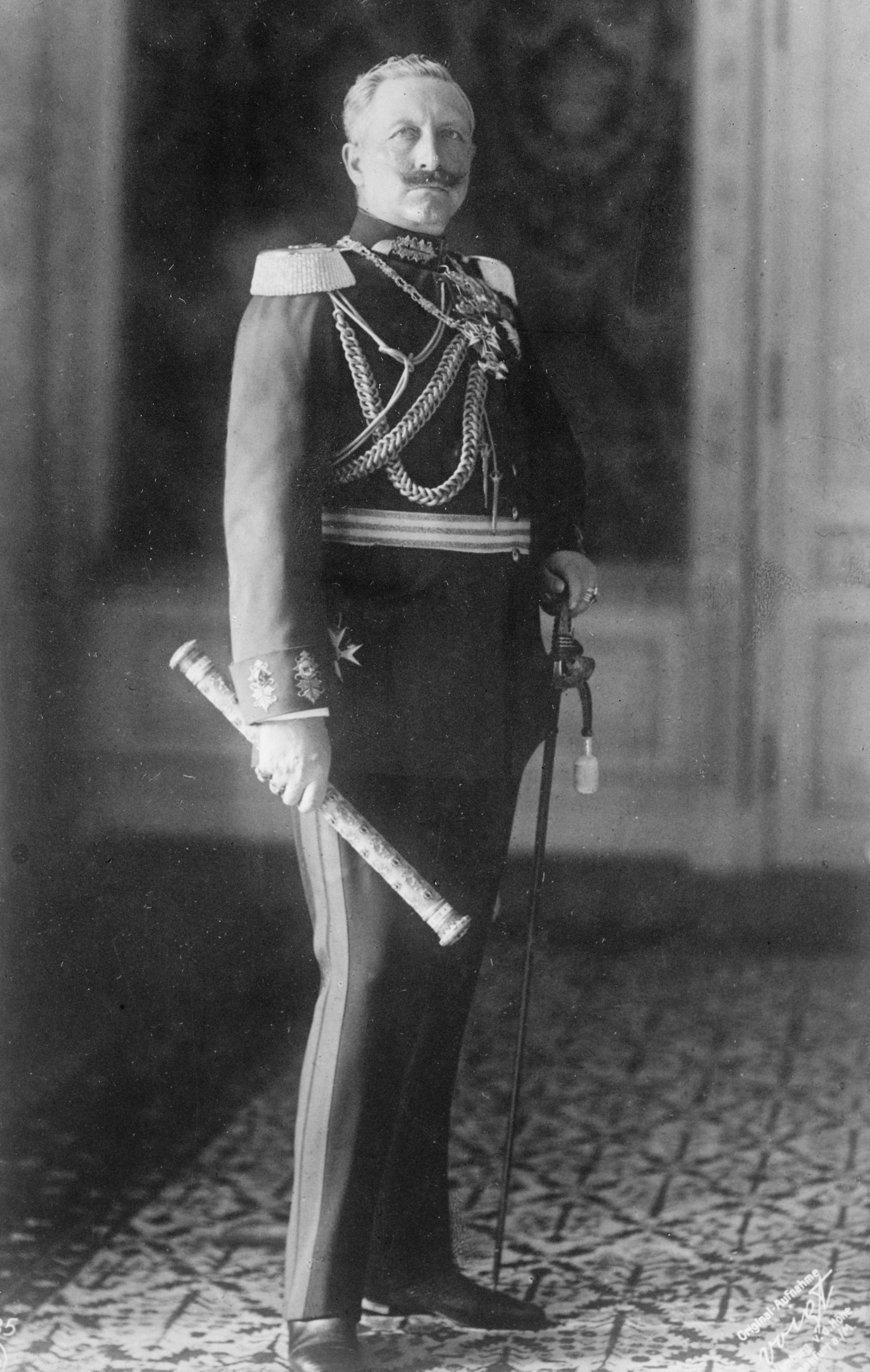
Emperor Wilhelm II in 1918

Gerd Heinrich believed that democracy in Germany would have had a better chance under a regency. He based his conclusion on the judgement of Winston Churchill, who said in 1939, "The overthrow of the monarchy in Germany was our greatest political mistake." Wilhelm II had hoped that the Nazis would return either him or one of his sons or grandsons to the throne, but Adolf Hitler had no interest in a restoration. In January 1934, SA members stormed a reception that monarchists had organized to celebrate Wilhelm II's 75th birthday. They beat up guests, set off fireworks and smashed furniture. Hitler himself publicly rejected the aspirations of the Hohenzollerns in his speech on the first anniversary of his rise to power on 30 January 1934 in the National Socialist Reichstag, saying "What has been will never come again". Over the following months, the hopes harboured by the former emperor's family and their supporters that the National Socialists could be used as a vehicle to return Wilhelm to the throne increasingly faded. It had probably always been illusory.

It is widely believed that the 1919 constitution had several weaknesses, making the eventual establishment of a dictatorship likely, but it is impossible to know whether a different constitution could have prevented the rise of the Nazi party. The 1949 West German constitution (the Basic Law of the Federal Republic of Germany) is generally viewed as a strong response to these flaws.

- The Weimar presidency was frequently considered an Ersatzkaiser ("substitute emperor"), an attempt to replace the emperors with a similarly strong institution meant to diminish party politics. Article 48 of the Constitution gave the president power to "take all necessary steps" if "public order and security are seriously disturbed or endangered". Although it was intended as an emergency clause, it was often used before 1933 to issue decrees without the support of Parliament and also made Hitler's Gleichschaltung easier.
- During the Weimar Republic, it was accepted that a law did not have to conform to the constitution as long as it had the support of two-thirds of Parliament, the same majority needed to change the constitution. That was a precedent for the Enabling Act of 1933. The Basic Law of 1949 requires an explicit change of the wording, and it prohibits abolishing the basic rights or the federal structure of the republic.
- The use of a proportional representation without large thresholds meant a party with a small amount of support could gain entry into the Reichstag. That led to many small parties, some extremist, building political bases within the system, and made it difficult to form and maintain a stable coalition government, further contributing to instability. To counter the problem, the modern German Bundestag introduced a 5% threshold limit for a party to gain parliamentary representation. However, the Reichstag of the monarchy was fractioned to a similar degree even if it was elected by majority vote (under a two-round system).
- The Reichstag could remove the chancellor from office even if it was unable to agree on a successor. With the Reichstag increasingly fractured, President Hindenburg rather than the Reichstag chose the Republic's last four chancellors (Brüning, Papen, Schleicher and Hitler). They all governed by presidential decree. The 1949 Basic Law stipulates that a chancellor may not be removed by Parliament unless a successor is elected at the same time, a procedure known as a "constructive vote of no confidence".
- The fundamental rights of habeas corpus, sanctity of the home, inviolability of the mail, freedom of speech and the press, freedom of assembly, freedom of association (including religious associations) and the inviolability of property – Articles 114, 115, 117, 118, 123, 124 and 153 of the Weimar Constitution – could be suspended under Article 48. The Basic Law lists them as basic rights that cannot legally be nullified and in Article 20 (4) includes the right to resist attempts to abolish the constitutional order.

=== Role of individuals and parties ===
Chancellor Heinrich Brüning's deflationary economic policy from 1930 to 1932 has been the subject of much debate. It caused many Germans to identify the Republic with cuts in social spending.

Franz von Papen, who was chancellor of Germany from 30 May to 17 November 1932, ousted the elected government of the Free State of Prussia in the 1932 Prussian coup d'état, which eliminated one of the last potential bastions of resistance to Hitler's seizure of power. Prussia was led by the Social Democratic Party, was home to the federal capital Berlin and had 61% of the Weimar Republic's population. Papen also pressured Hindenburg to appoint Hitler as chancellor and himself as vice chancellor in 1933 in a cabinet ostensibly not under Nazi Party domination. Papen and his allies were quickly marginalized by Hitler.

Paul von Hindenburg became president of Germany in 1925. As he was an old-style monarchist conservative, he had little love for the Republic, but for the most part, he acted formally within the bounds of the constitution. However, he ultimately — on the advice of his son and others close to him — appointed Hitler chancellor, thereby effectively ending the Republic after the passage of the Enabling Act of 1933. Additionally, Hindenburg's death in 1934 ended the last obstacle for Hitler to assume full power in the Weimar Republic.

The German National People's Party (DNVP) has also been blamed as responsible for the downfall of the Weimar Republic because of its ultranationalist positions and its unwillingness to accept the Republic because of its monarchist ideology. In his book, The Rise and Fall of the Third Reich, journalist and historian William L. Shirer wrote that the DNVP's status as a far-right party rather than a mainstream conservative party was one of the main reasons for the Weimar Republic's downfall. In Shirer's view, the DNVP's refusal to "take a responsible position either in the government or in the opposition" during most of Weimar's existence denied Weimar "that stability provided in many other countries by a truly conservative party." Similarly, conservative British historian Sir John Wheeler-Bennett blamed the DNVP for failing to reconcile with the Republic, stating that "Under the cloak of loyalty to the Monarchy, they either held aloof or sabotaged the efforts of successive Chancellors to give a stable government to the Republic. The truth is that after 1918 many German Nationalists were more influenced by feelings of disloyalty to the Republic than of loyalty to the Kaiser, and it was this motive which led them to make their fatal contribution to bringing Hitler to power."

== Legacy ==
Nazi propaganda tended to describe the Weimar Republic as a period of treason, degeneration, and corruption. The whole period from 1918 to 1933 was described in propaganda as "The time of the System" (Systemzeit), while the Republic itself was known as "The System" (Das System), a term that was adopted into everyday use after 1933. Another Nazi phrase used for the republic and its politicians was "the November criminals" or "the regime of the November criminals" (German: November-Verbrecher), referring to the month the republic was founded in (November 1918).

According to Foreign Policy, the Weimar Republic is seen as "the best-known historical example of a 'failed' democracy that ceded to fascism".

== Government ==
How the Weimar government worked as defined under the Constitution. Executive functions are in green, legislative in tan. The "Reich Council" (green) is the Reichsrat. "Parlamente der Länder" (tan) are the state parliaments.

=== Constitution of 1919 ===
The constitution created a federal semi-presidential republic with a parliament, the Reichstag, that was elected by universal suffrage using proportional representation. The appointed Reichsrat represented the interests of the federal states. The president of Germany had supreme command over the military, extensive emergency powers, and appointed and removed the chancellor, who was responsible to the Reichstag.

=== Federal ===
==== Reichsrat ====
The Reichsrat's powers were relatively limited, making it weaker than its predecessor, the Bundesrat of the German Empire (1871–1918). Members were appointed by the German state governments to represent their interests in legislation and in administration of the nation at the federal level. The Reichsrat could introduce legislation for the Reichstag to consider and veto laws that it passed, but the vetoes could be overridden.

==== Reichstag ====
The Reichstag voted on the laws of the Reich and was responsible for the budget, questions of war and peace, and confirmation of state treaties. Oversight of the Reich government (the ministers responsible for executing the laws) also resided with the Reichstag. It could force individual ministers or the entire government to resign by means of a vote of no confidence, and under Article 48 of the constitution it could rescind emergency decrees issued by the Reich president. The Reich president could dissolve the Reichstag under Article 25 but only once for the same reason.

==== President and chancellor ====
The president was popularly elected, served a 7-year term and could be reelected. The president had to be at least 36 years old and took an oath of office swearing to work for the good of the German people and uphold the constitution. The president appointed the chancellor and, at his recommendation, appointed and dismissed members of the cabinet as well. It was also necessary for the cabinet to have the confidence of the Reichstag (parliament) because it could be removed by a vote of no confidence. All bills had to receive the signature of the president to become law and, although he did not have an absolute veto on legislation, he could insist that a law be submitted for the approval of voters in a referendum. The president had the authority to dissolve the Reichstag, conduct foreign affairs, and command the armed forces. Article 48 of the constitution provided the president sweeping powers in the event of a crisis. If there was a threat to "public order and security", he could, with the co-signature of the chancellor (per article 50), suspend civil rights and legislate by decree.

The chancellor had the prerogative to determine the policy direction of government. In reality this power was limited by the needs of coalition governments of the major political parties (and numerous smaller minor ones) plus the powers of the Reich president. Cabinet decisions were taken by majority vote.

==== Voting ====
Voting was by universal, equal, secret, and direct suffrage, using a system of party-list proportional representation. All citizens who had reached the age of 20 were allowed to vote, including women for the first time, but excluding soldiers on active duty.

=== States ===
Prior to the First World War, the constituent states of the German Empire were 22 monarchies, three republican city-states, and the Imperial Territory of Alsace–Lorraine. As a result of the Treaty of Versailles, Alsace–Lorraine was returned to France. All the other states continued as federal states of the new Republic. The Thuringian states merged to form the state of Thuringia in 1920, except for Saxe-Coburg, which became part of Bavaria.

State	Capital
Free States (Freistaaten)
Anhalt	Dessau
Baden	Karlsruhe
Bavaria (Bayern)	Munich
Brunswick (Braunschweig)	Braunschweig
Coburg – to Bavaria in 1920	Coburg
Hesse (Hessen)	Darmstadt
Lippe	Detmold
Mecklenburg-Schwerin	Schwerin
Mecklenburg-Strelitz	Neustrelitz
Oldenburg	Oldenburg
Prussia (Preußen)	Berlin
Saxony (Sachsen)	Dresden
Schaumburg-Lippe	Bückeburg
Thuringia (Thüringen) – from 1920	Weimar
Waldeck-Pyrmont – to Prussia (Pyrmont joined Prussia in 1921, Waldeck followed in 1929)	Arolsen
Württemberg	Stuttgart
Free and Hanseatic Cities (Freie und Hansestädte)
Bremen
Hamburg
Lübeck
States merged to form Thuringia in 1920
Reuss	Gera
Saxe-Altenburg (Sachsen-Altenburg)	Altenburg
Saxe-Gotha (Sachsen-Gotha)	Gotha
Saxe-Meiningen (Sachsen-Meiningen)	Meiningen
Saxe-Weimar-Eisenach (Sachsen-Weimar-Eisenach)	Weimar
Schwarzburg-Rudolstadt	Rudolstadt
Schwarzburg-Sondershausen	Sondershausen

The states were gradually abolished under the Nazi regime via the Gleichschaltung process, whereby they were effectively replaced by Gaue. There were two notable de jure changes, however. At the end of 1933, Mecklenburg-Strelitz was merged with Mecklenburg-Schwerin to form a united Mecklenburg. Second, in April 1937, the city-state of Lübeck was formally incorporated into Prussia by the Greater Hamburg Act. Most of the remaining states, notably Prussia (see Abolition of Prussia) were formally dissolved by the Allies at the end of the Second World War and ultimately reorganized into the modern states of Germany.

== See also ==
- Weimar political parties
- Democracy in Europe
