= Deutsche Gildenschaft =

The Deutsche Gildenschaft (German Guild) is a small German federation of non-duelling, traditionally völkisch influenced student fraternities founded in 1920, re-established in 1958, and known for its roots in the youth movement and connections to right-wing intellectual circles.
