= Vax (disambiguation) =

Vax or VAX is a computing instruction set architecture by DEC.

VAX or Vax may also refer to:

- VAX (band), a musical band co-founded by Alex P
- Vax (brand), Vax UK Ltd, a floorcare brand, including vacuum cleaners
- V Air, a low-cost carrier based in Taiwan, ICAO code VAX
- Vax'ildan ("Vax"), a fictional half-elven rogue / paladin / druid in the D&D web series Critical Role
- Clipping of vaccine

== See also ==
- VAX Unit of Performance or VUP, an obsolete measurement of computer performance
- VAXELN, a real-time operating system for the VAX architecture.
- Andrew Vachss (born 1942), American crime fiction author, child protection consultant, and attorney exclusively representing children and youths
- E*vax, American electronic music artist and half of New York based indie/electronic band Ratatat
- Anti-vax, a reluctance or refusal to be vaccinated
- Vacs
- Vaks
- VAC (disambiguation)
- Vack
- Vak (disambiguation)
- VAQ
