= Vak =

VAK or Vak may refer to:

- Våk, Våler, Østfold, Norway; a village
- Vāk, Hindu goddess of speech
- Chevak Airport, Alaska (IATA Code: VAK)
- VAK (Visual Auditory Kinesthetic), a system of learning styles in NLP (neuro-linguistic programming), see Representational systems (NLP)
- VAK (Vysshaya Attestacionnaya Komissiya), the Higher Attestation Commission, the main academic degree awarding body in the USSR and Russia

== See also ==
- VAC (disambiguation)
- Vack
- VAQ
- Vax (disambiguation)
- Vaks
