= Vazha =

Vazha (Georgian: ვაჟა) is a Georgian given name. Notable people with the name include:

- Vazha Kacharava (born 1937), Georgian volleyball player
- Vazha Lortkipanidze (born 1949), Georgian politician and statesman, former Prime Minister of Georgia
- Vazha Tarkhnishvili (born 1971), Georgian footballer
- Vazha-Pshavela, the pen-name of the Georgian poet and writer Luka P. Razikashvili (1861–1915)
- Vazha Zarandia, Chairman of the Soviet of Ministers of Abkhazia from May 1992 to December 1993

== See also ==
- Vazha-Pshavela (biographical novel), a 2011 Georgian biographical novel by Miho Mosulishvili
- Sirithu Vazha Vendum, a 1974 Indian Tamil film directed by S. S. Balan
- Vacha (disambiguation)
- Vasa (disambiguation)
- Vazhkai
- Viacha
- Visakha
- Viscacha
