= Vacha =

Vacha may refer to:

- Acorus calamus, Vacha (Sk 'to speak') an ayurvedic medicine, mentioned in the bible
- Vacha Reservoir, a reservoir in Bulgaria
- Vacha (river), a river in Bulgaria
- Vacha (Verwaltungsgemeinschaft), a Verwaltungsgemeinschaft in the district Wartburgkreis in Thuringia, Germany
- Vacha, Germany, a town in Thuringia, Germany
- Vacha, Russia, name of several inhabited localities in Russia

== People ==
- Vácha, Czech surname
- Hirji Vacha Modi, Parsi businessman and philanthropist from India

== See also ==
- Manasa, vacha, karmana, a Hindu philosophical concept
- Vaca (disambiguation)
- Vac (disambiguation)
