= Saxe-Weimar-Eisenach =

Historical German state from 1809 to 1920

Coordinates: 50°59′0″N 11°10′0″E

(Grand) Duchy of Saxe-Weimar-Eisenach (1809–1903) (Groß-)Herzogtum Sachsen-Weimar-Eisenach Grand Duchy of Saxony (1903–1918) Großherzogtum Sachsen
- 1809–1918
- Top: Flag (1813–1897); Bottom: Flag (1897–1920) Coat of arms
- Anthem: Weimars Volkslied

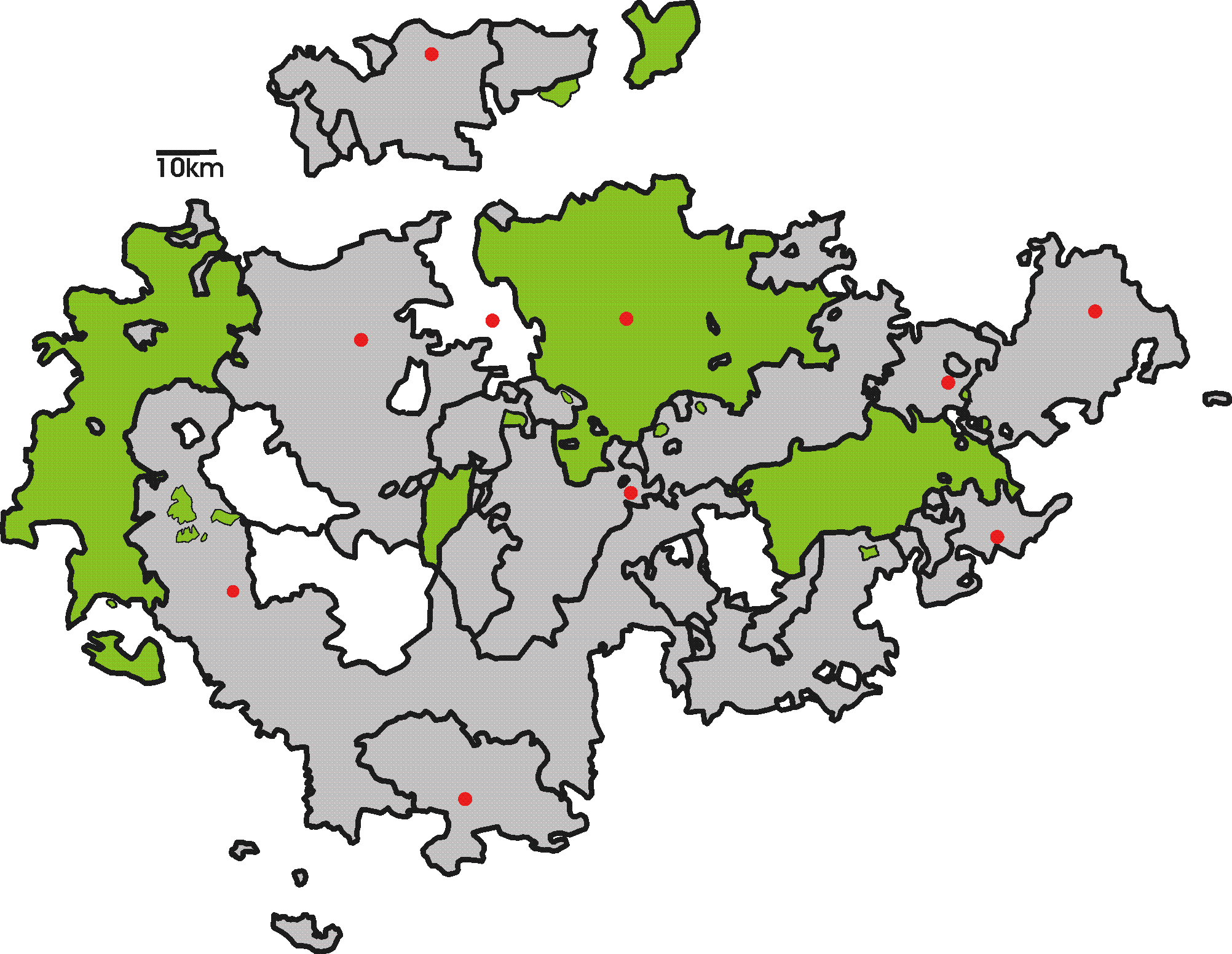
- Saxe-Weimar-Eisenach, shown within the Ernestine duchies
- Status: State of the Confederation of the Rhine (1809–1813) independent (1814–1815); State of the German Confederation (1815–1848); State of German Empire (1848–1849) independent state (1849–1850); State of the German Confederation (1850–1866); Federal State of the North German Confederation (1867–1871); Federal State of the German Empire (1871–1918)
- Capital: Weimar
- Common languages: German; Thuringian dialect
- Government: Absolute monarchy (1809–1816); Constitutional monarchy (1816–1918)
- Grand Duke
  - 1809–1828: Karl August (first)
  - 1901–1918: William Ernest (last)
- Historical era: Middle Ages
  - Saxe-Eisenach and Saxe-Weimar held in personal union: 1741
  - Merger of Eisenach and Weimar: September 20, 1809
  - Raised to grand duchy: 1815
  - German Revolution: 1918
  - Joined Thuringia: 1918

Area
- 1800: 2,052 km^{2} (792 sq mi)

Population
  - 1800: 109,000
- Currency: Saxon thaler (to 1857); Saxon Vereinsthaler (1857–1873); German gold mark (1873–1918)
Preceded by	Succeeded by
Saxe-Weimar; Saxe-Eisenach	Free State of Saxe-Weimar-Eisenach
- Today part of: Germany

Saxe-Weimar-Eisenach (German: Sachsen-Weimar-Eisenach) was a German state, created as a duchy in 1809 by the merger of the Ernestine duchies of Saxe-Weimar and Saxe-Eisenach, which had been in personal union since 1741. It was raised to a grand duchy in 1815 by resolution of the Congress of Vienna. In 1903, it officially changed its name to the Grand Duchy of Saxony (German: Großherzogtum Sachsen), but this name was rarely used. The grand duchy came to an end in the German Revolution of 1918–19 with the other monarchies of the German Empire. It was succeeded by the Free State of Saxe-Weimar-Eisenach, which was merged into the new State of Thuringia two years later.

The full grand ducal style was Grand Duke of Saxe-Weimar-Eisenach, Landgrave in Thuringia, Margrave of Meissen, Princely Count of Henneberg, Lord of Blankenhayn, Neustadt and Tautenburg.

The Saxe-Weimar-Eisenach branch has been the most genealogically senior extant branch of the House of Wettin since 1672.

== Geography ==
The Grand Duchy of Saxe-Weimar-Eisenach consisted of three greater areas, each of which formed a Kreis administratively, plus several exclaves. Neighboring countries were Prussia, Saxony, Bavaria, Hesse-Kassel (until 1866, when it was incorporated in the Prussian Province of Hesse-Nassau), and all the other Thuringian states (Saxe-Altenburg, Saxe-Coburg-Gotha, Saxe-Meiningen, Reuss Elder Line, Reuss Junior Line, Schwarzburg-Rudolstadt and Schwarzburg-Sondershausen).

The northern part of the Weimar district was flat and part of the Thuringian Basin; the southern and eastern parts were situated on the Ilm-Saale Plateau and in the Saale valley. The northern part of Eisenach district was hilly (Hörselberge and Hainich hills); the central part with the town of Eisenach was in the Hörsel valley; further south were the mountains of the Thuringian Forest, followed by the Werra valley, the Kupenrhön mountains and finally, in the far south, the main chain of the Rhön mountains. The district Neustadt was located in hills with altitudes between 200 and 400 meters.

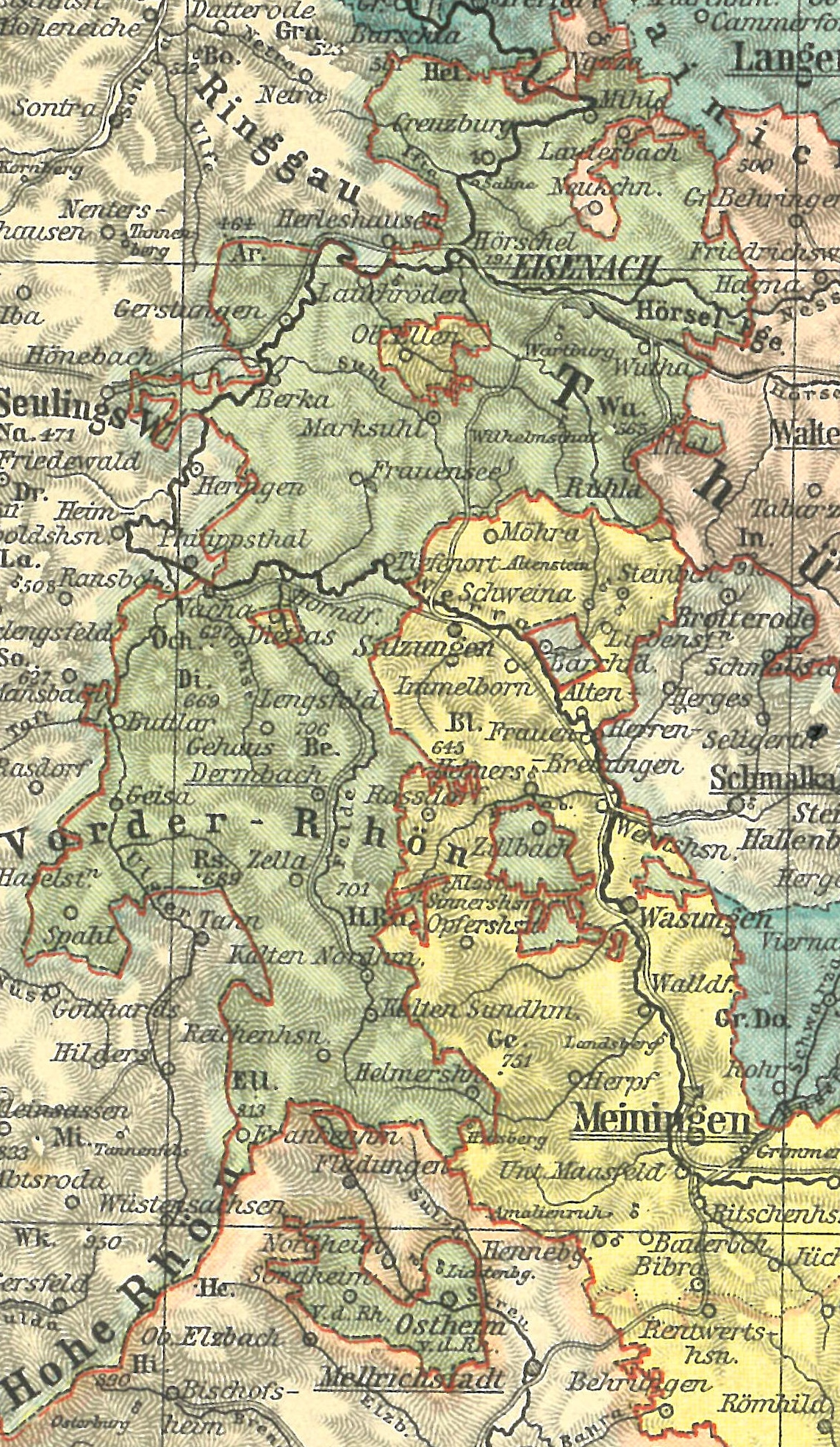
Vorder-Rhön

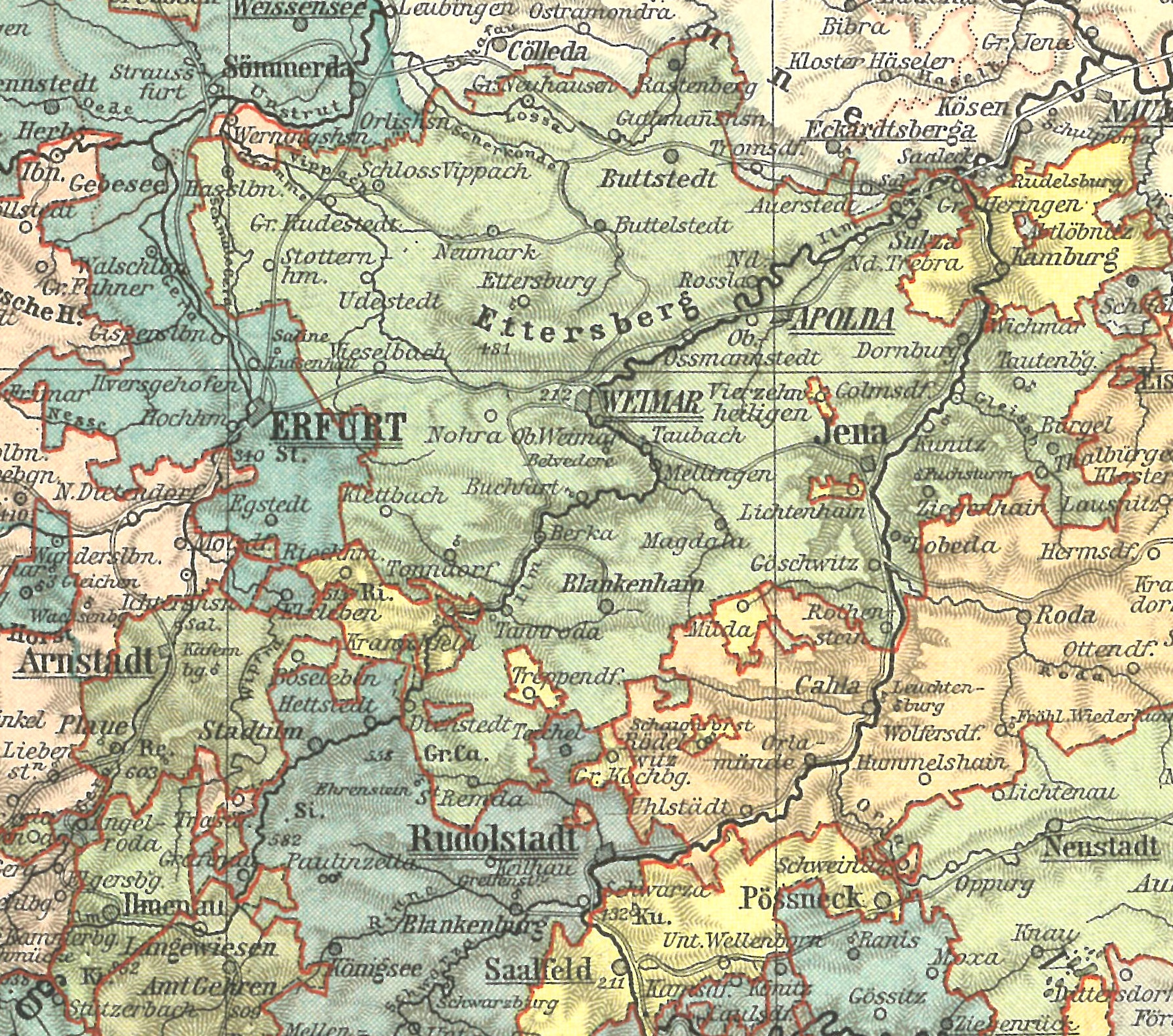
Ettersberg

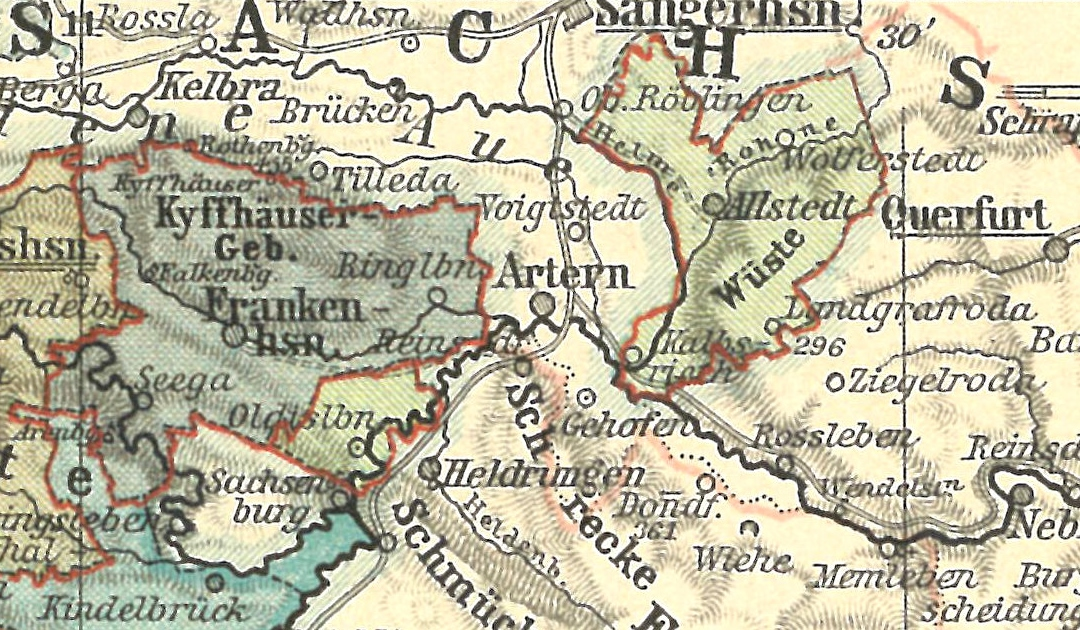
Wüste

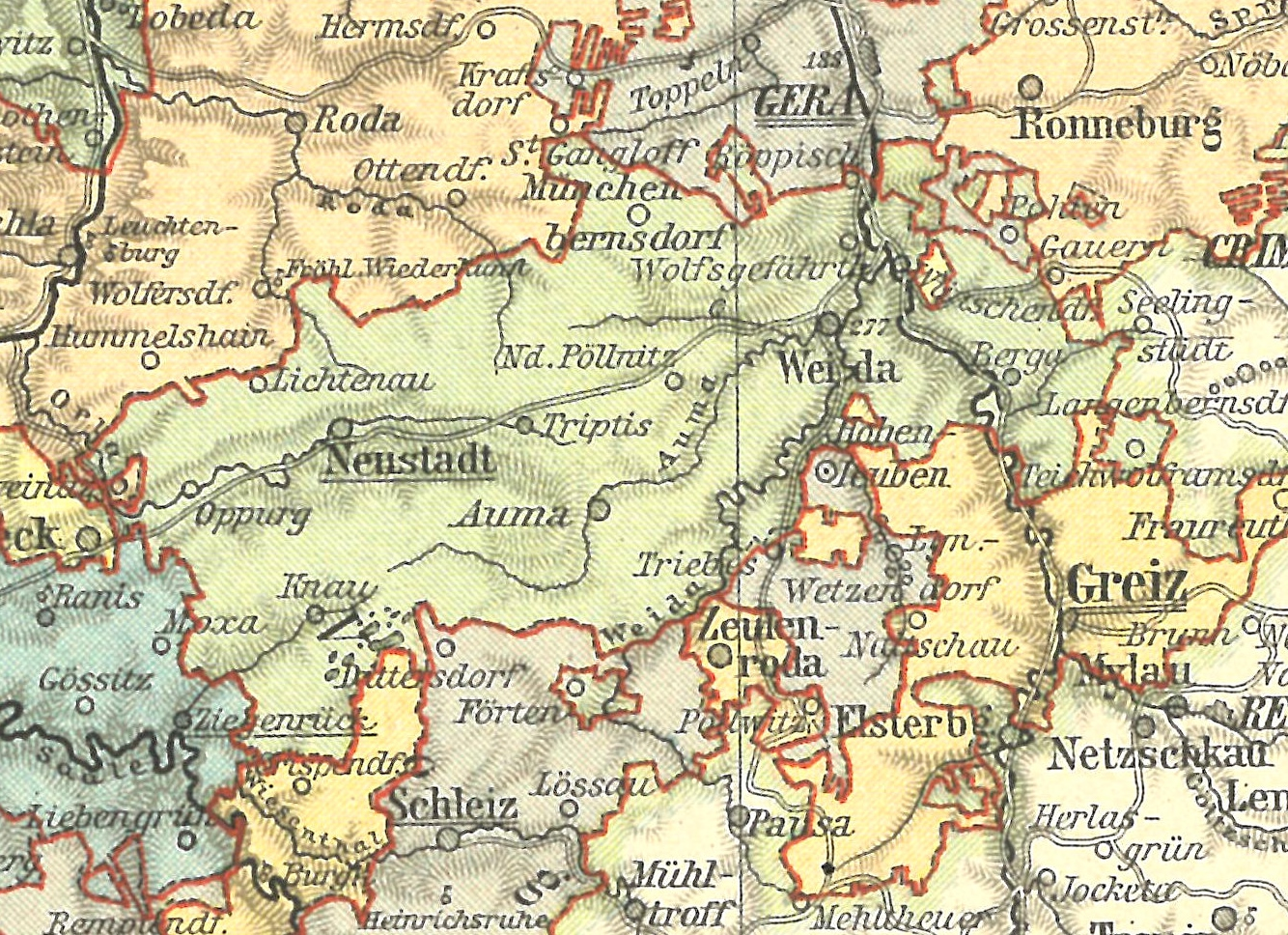
Neustadt

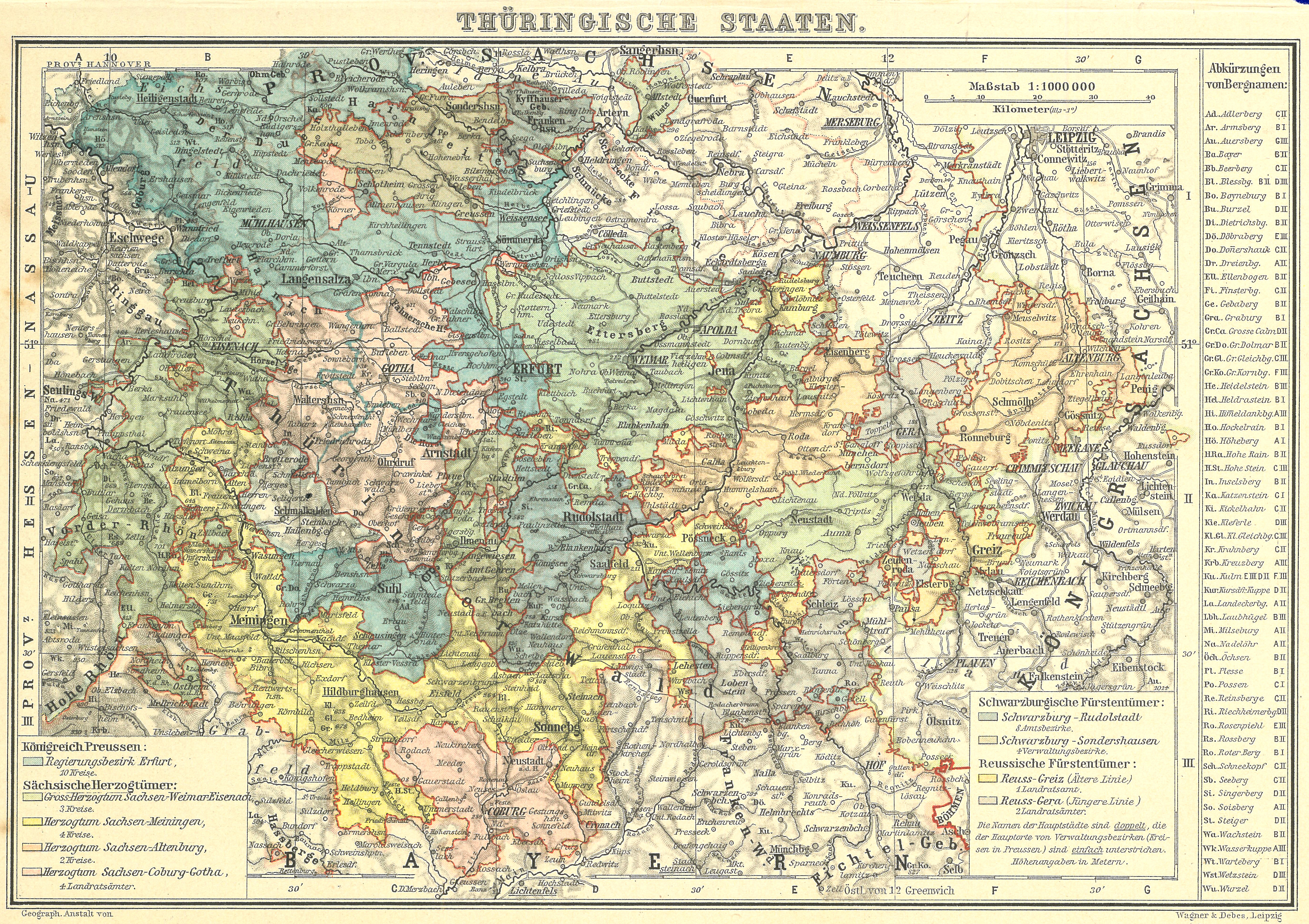
Ernestine duchies, in 1893

The main rivers in the country were:

- the Saale flowing through Jena in the east
- the Werra in Vacha and Eisenach, and its tributaries the Felda and Ulster in the west
- the Unstrut in the exclaves Allstedt and Oldisleben in the north
- the White Elster in Berga in the far east
- the Ilm, flowing through Ilmenau, Apolda and the capital Weimar in the centre. Acting Prime Minister Goethe once described Weimar as "Athens on the Ilm".

The highest elevation in the grand duchy were the Kickelhahn (861 m above sea level (NN)) near Ilmenau, the Ellenbogen (814 m above sea level (NN)) in the Rhön and the Ettersberg (477 m above sea level (NN)) near Weimar.

In 1895, the Grand Duchy of Saxe-Weimar-Eisenach was administratively divided into three districts (Kreise):

District	Area in square kilometers	Residents	Cities	exclaves
District Weimar	1752.59	191,975	Weimar, Apolda, Jena, Ilmenau, Allstedt, Rastenberg, Buttstädt, Buttelstedt, Neumark, Dornburg, Bürgel, Lobeda, Bad Sulza, Magdala, Bad Berka, Blankenhain, Remda, Kranichfeld and Tannroda	Ilmenau, Bösleben, Klein Kröbitz, Allstedt and Oldisleben
District Eisenach	1214.03	95,226	Eisenach, Creuzburg, Berka/Werra, Ruhla, Vacha, Stadtlengsfeld, Geisa, Ostheim vor der Rhön and Kaltennordheim	Seebach, Ostheim vor der Rhön and Zillbach
District Neustadt	628.71	52,016	Neustadt an der Orla, Triptis, Auma, Weida and Berga/Elster	Rußdorf, Teichwolframsdorf and Förthen

Furthermore, the districts of Weimar and Eisenach were each subdivided into two Bezirke. In the case of Weimar, these were: Weimar and Apolda, in the case of Eisenach they were the Eisenach and Dermbach. In all, there were 31 cities and 594 municipalities in the Grand Duchy. The Grand Dukes of Saxe-Weimar-Eisenach granted "city" status to three localities in the state, namely Berka/Werra (Eisenach district, 1847), Ruhla (Eisenach district, 1886, administered jointly with the Duke of Saxe-Gotha) and Münchenbernsdorf (Neustadt district, 1904).

In 1840, there were 13 cities with over 2,000 inhabitants. In the 70 years to 1910, the Grand Duchy industrialized heavily and the population of the largest cities grew, while the medium-sized cities remained constant or even lost population. The population of Stadtlengsfeld shrank dramatically after the Jewish emancipation, when most of the city's Jewish citizens migrated to larger cities.

City	Population 1 Dec 1840
Weimar	11,444
Eisenach	9,377
Jena	5,949
Neustadt an der Orla	4,154
Apolda	4,128
Weida	3,756
Ilmenau	2,721
Allstedt	2,507
Ostheim vor der Rhön	2,497
Stadtlengsfeld	2,239
Vacha	2,239
Buttstädt	2,164
Creuzburg	2,103

City	Population 1 Dec 1910	Change from 1840
Jena	38,487	+ 547%
Eisenach	38,362	+ 309%
Weimar	34,582	+ 202%
Apolda	22,610	+ 448%
Ilmenau	12,202	+ 348%
Weida	9,036	+ 141%
Neustadt an der Orla	7,095	+ 71%
Allstedt	3,353	+ 34%
Buttstädt	2,843	+ 32%
Ostheim vor der Rhön	2,277	– 9%
Vacha	2,240	0 %
Creuzburg	2,062	– 2%
Stadtlengsfeld	1,593	– 29%

In 1910, several other towns had grown past the 2,000 inhabitants mark: Ruhla (Weimar part: 3917 v. 1533: +156%), Blankenhain (3405 v. 1689: +102%), Bad Sulza, (3052 v. 1422: +115%), Auma (2978 v. 1701, +75%), Triptis (2948 v. 1480: +99%), Tiefenort (2539 v. 1237: +105%), Bad Berka (2379 v. 1228: +94%), Oberweimar (2095 v. 621: +237%), Oldisleben (2064 v. 1332: +55) and Mihla (2008 v. 1294: +55%).

== History ==
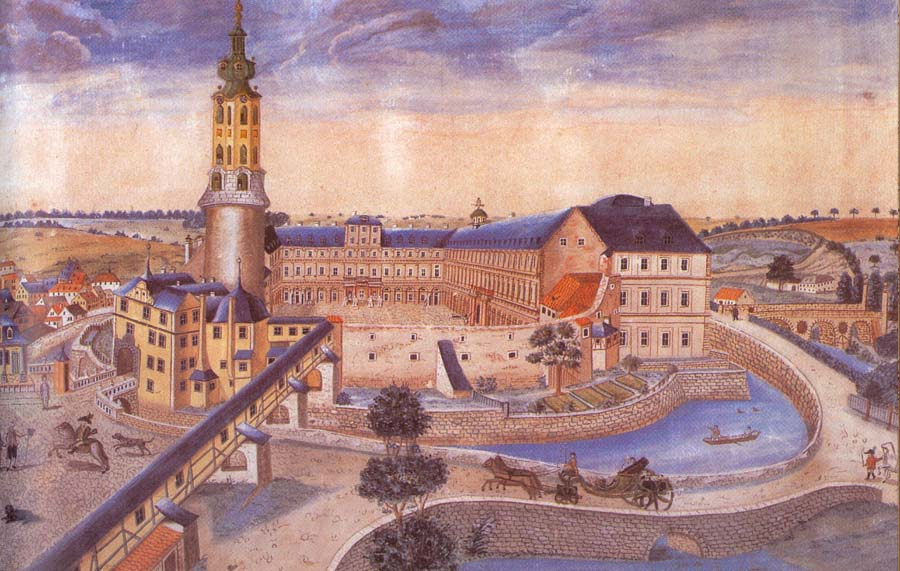
Schloss Weimar, the ducal palace

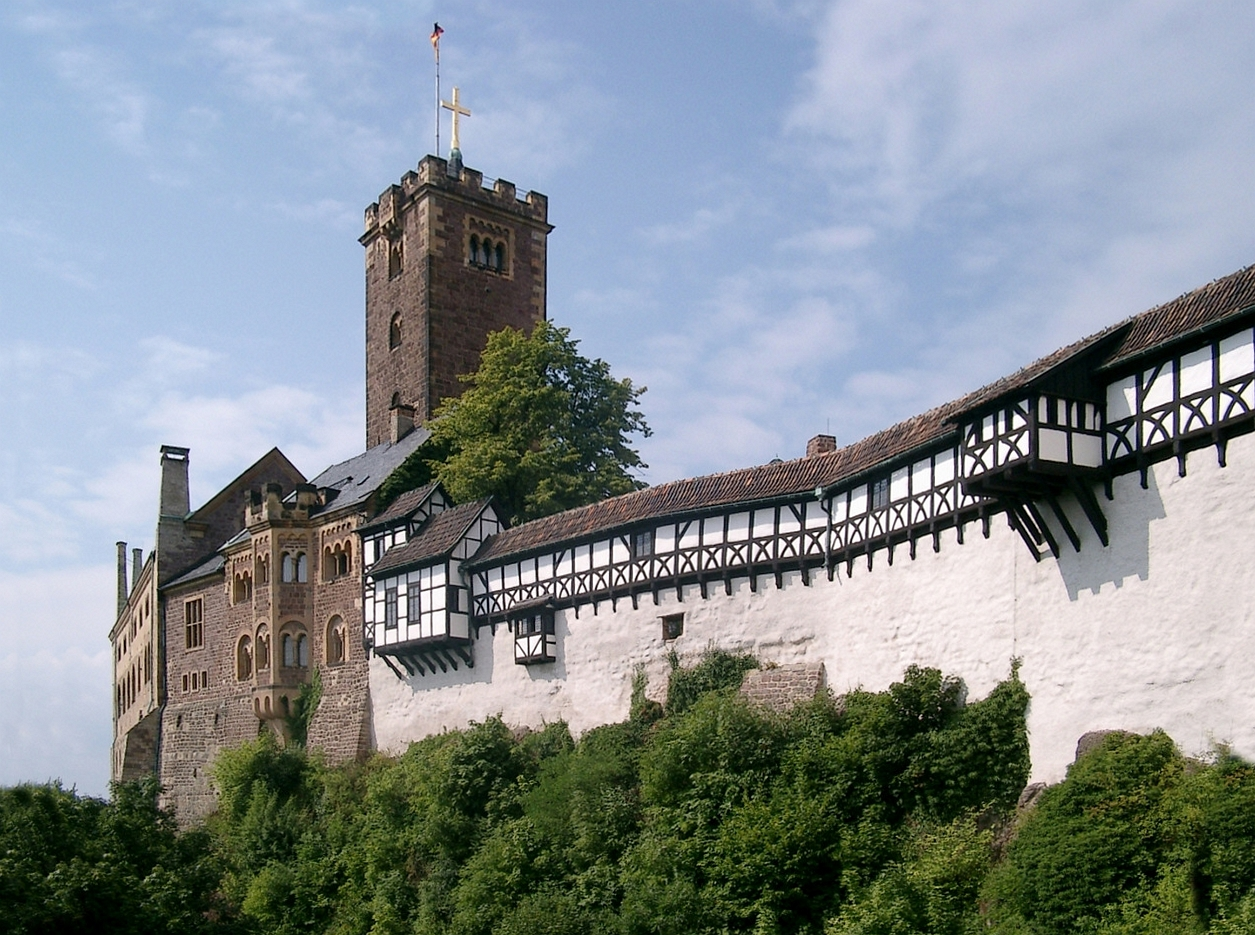
Wartburg Castle near Eisenach

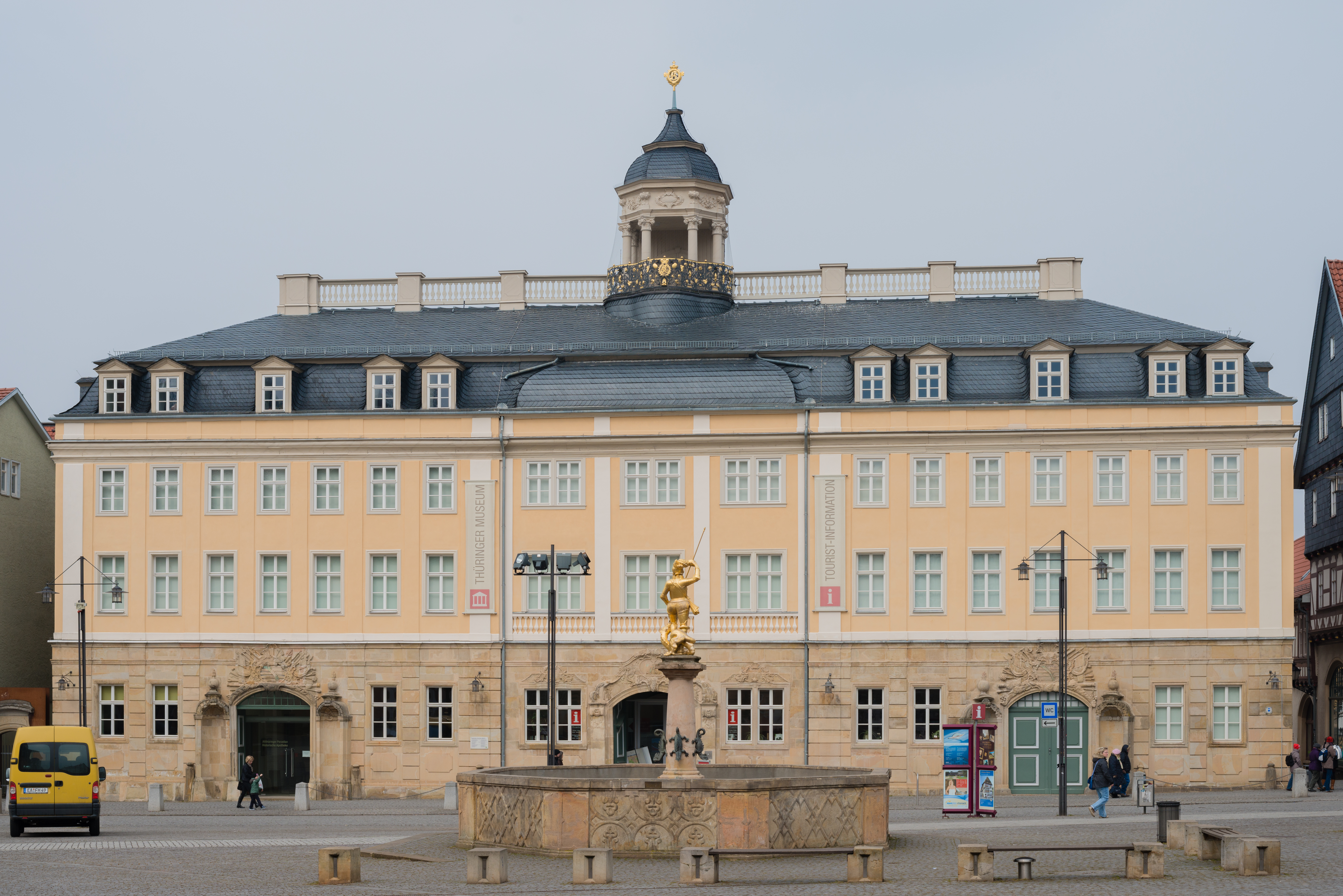
The former Ducal Palace of Eisenach, finished in 1748 by Ernest Augustus I, Duke of Saxe-Weimar-Eisenach

The duchies of Saxe-Weimar and Saxe-Eisenach had been ruled in personal union by the same branch of the House of Wettin since 1741, after the Eisenach line had died out upon the death of Duke Wilhelm Heinrich. The first Duke of the personal union was Ernest Augustus I, who built the Belvedere Palace in Weimar. His son Ernest Augustus II reigned for only three years, and died at the age of 20. At the age of 18, he married the Brunswick Princess Anna Amalia, one year his junior and a niece of King Frederick the Great of Prussia. A year later she gave birth to her son, Charles Augustus and after another year, when she was already a widow, to her son Constantine.

As Dowager Duchess Anna Amalia actively took up the regency, with the approval of the Empress Maria Theresa and the support of her ethical Minister Baron von Fritsch. As educator for her sons, she employed the poet Christoph Martin Wieland, who was a professor at the University of Erfurt.

At 18 years of age, Charles Augustus married Princess Louise of Hesse-Darmstadt. He employed the poet Johann Wolfgang von Goethe, with whom he soon became friends. Goethe, in turn, invited the authors Johann Gottfried Herder and Friedrich Schiller to Weimar, thus laying the foundation for the Weimar Classicism circle, which was supported in the background by Anna Amalia. Later regents would see it as main task to guard this heritage.

In 1804 Duke Charles Augustus' eldest son and heir Charles Frederick married Maria Pavlovna Romanova, sister of Emperor Alexander I of Russia, a conjugal union which decisively promoted the rise of the Ernestine Saxe-Weimar dynasty. It also gave the duchy some protection during the turmoil of the Napoleonic Wars. Though at first an ally of Prussia in the Napoleonic War of the Fourth Coalition, Duke Charles Augustus escaped his deposition by joining the Confederation of the Rhine on 15 December 1806.

After the official merger in 1809, the Duchy of Saxe-Weimar-Eisenach consisted of the separate districts around the capital Weimar in the north and Eisenach in the west. Thanks to their Russian connection, the duchy gained substantially from the Congress of Vienna in 1815. In the east, it gained most of the Neustädter Kreis (Neustadt district; 629 km^{2}, 243 sq mi) from the Kingdom of Saxony. It also received most of the Principality of Erfurt, which had been an exclave of Mainz before the war and a directly administered French fief under occupation. It further gained smaller possessions, such as Blankenhain and Kranichfeld. In the Rhön area, the Eisenacher Oberland was created from adjacent former parts of Hesse-Kassel and territories held by the secularized Princely Abbey of Fulda. Finally, the country was raised to a grand duchy – as the only branch of the Ernestine line of the House of Wettin, which had several reigning dukes but only one grand duke. The Albertine line simultaneously attained the rank of kings of Saxony.

The cosmopolitan Grand Duke Charles Augustus gave his grand duchy the first liberal constitution in Germany, on 5 May 1816. Students of the University of Jena organized themselves as Germany's first fraternity, the Urburschenschaft and celebrated Wartburg Festival at the Wartburg in October 1817. Many liberal-minded people participated and the speakers, most of them students, must be regarded as having been among the earliest democrats in Germany.

Maria Pavlovna, who was grand duchess from 1828, featuring composers like Franz Liszt and Peter Cornelius. Her art-loving son Charles Alexander (1818–1901), who was grand duke from 1853, also supported the arts, and music in particular. He was married to Sophie, who supported his plans, and he rebuilt the decaying Wartburg the romantic historicism style of the day and had it painted by Moritz von Schwind. He also supported, albeit half-heartedly, the founding of the School of Applied Arts in Weimar, which merged to form the Bauhaus in 1919.

A member of the German Confederation from 1815, the grand duchy was not seriously affected by the German revolutions of 1848 and remained neutral during the growing friction between Austria and Prussia over the following two decades. After the Austro-Prussian War the grand duchy became a member of the North German Confederation and in 1871 joined the new German Empire as a constituent state.

In 1901 Charles Alexander was succeeded by his grandson William Ernest, who was married to Caroline Reuss of Greiz and later to Feodora of Saxe-Meiningen. In 1903, the grand duchy officially changed its name to Grand Duchy of Saxony. However, many people continued to call it Saxe-Weimar-Eisenach, to avoid confusion with the neighbouring Kingdom of Saxony.

William Ernest abdicated the throne on 9 November 1918, thereby ending the monarchy in the state. It continued as the Free State of Saxe-Weimar-Eisenach, until 1920, when it merged with most of its neighbours to form Thuringia, with Weimar as the state capital.

=== Religion ===
In the Grand Duchy of Saxe-Weimar-Eisenach, as in all the Thuringian states, the Lutheran faith was the most prevalent. Specifically, in 1895, the reported religious affiliations of the 339,217 were:

- Evangelical: 325,315 (95.9%)
- Catholic: 12,112 (3.6%)
- Jewish: 1,290 (0.4%)
- Other / Non-denominational: 500 (0.1%)

In the district of Eisenach, the distribution was slightly different. Of the 95,226 inhabitants were:

- Evangelical: 85,319 (89.6%)
- Catholic: 8,809 (9.3%)
- Jewish: 979 (1.0%)
- Other / Non-denominational: 119 (0.1%)

The Catholic and Jewish minorities in the district Eisenach lived mainly in the Rhön. The area around the town of Geisa was predominantly Catholic and belonged to the Diocese of Fulda.

== Constitution and administration ==
Under the Constitution of 5 May 1816 (revised 15 October 1850), Saxe-Weimar-Eisenach was a constitutional monarchy, hereditary in the male line. Under the Electoral Act of 1852, the Landtag had 31 members, of whom 21 were elected in general elections. One member was elected by the landed former Imperial Knights, four were elected by other wealthy landowners, and five by voters who had an annual income exceeding 1000 Thaler from other sources. The latter group of voters were popularly called "thousand thaler men". The Electoral Act of 17 April 1896 enlarged the parliament to 33 members. The grand duchy had one vote in the Imperial Bundesrat and three members in the Reichstag.

In 1909, general suffrage was introduced, under the auspices of Alfred Appelius, the later Speaker of the Landtag. The large landowners and the "thousand thaler men" retained their extra votes, and five new special members were added to the parliament, representing the University of Jena, the Chamber of Commerce, the Chamber of Trade, the Chamber of Agriculture and the Chamber of Labour.

The highest court in the land was the Court of Appeals in Jena, which dealt with appeals from all Thuringian states. There were Regional Courts in Weimar and Eisenach.

The grand duchy had one infantry regiment, which after 1871 was part of the Imperial German Army's 11th Army Corps.

== Rulers of Saxe-Weimar-Eisenach ==
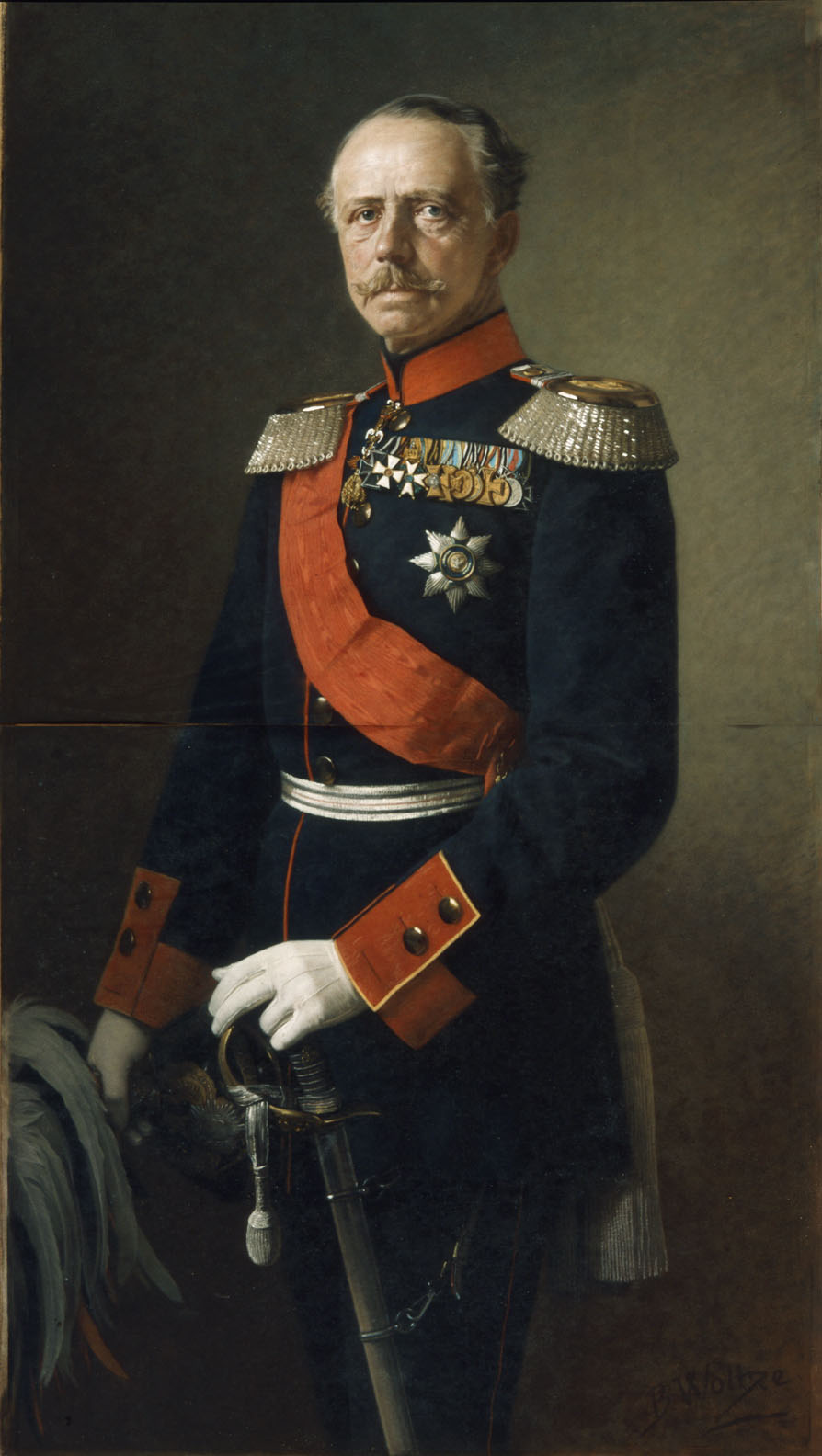
Grand Duke Charles Alexander (1853–1901). He joined the German Empire with his duchy in 1871 and rebuilt the world-famous Wartburg as a national monument.

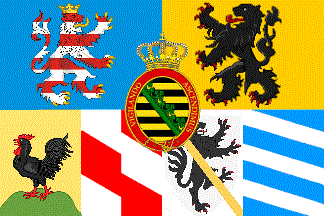
Grand Ducal Standard 1862-1878

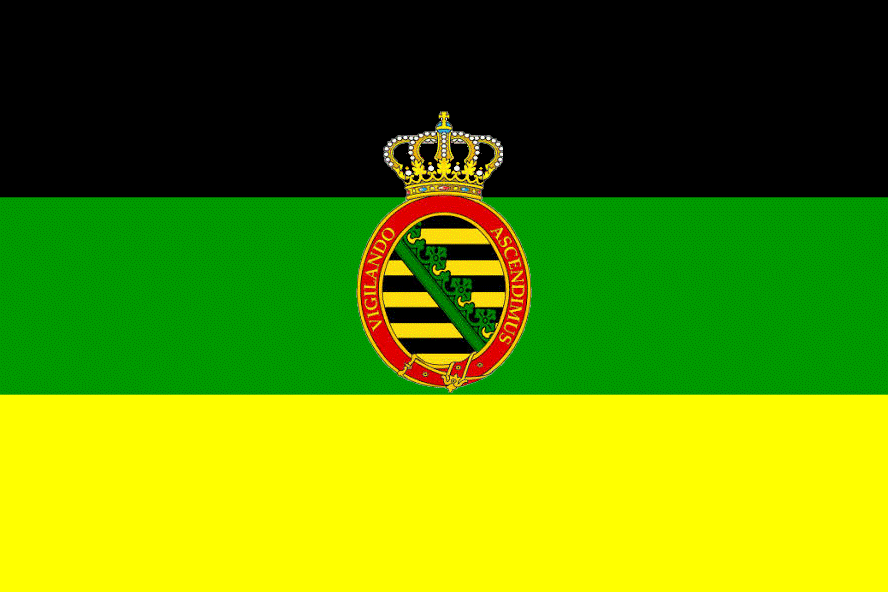
Grand Ducal Standard 1878-1897

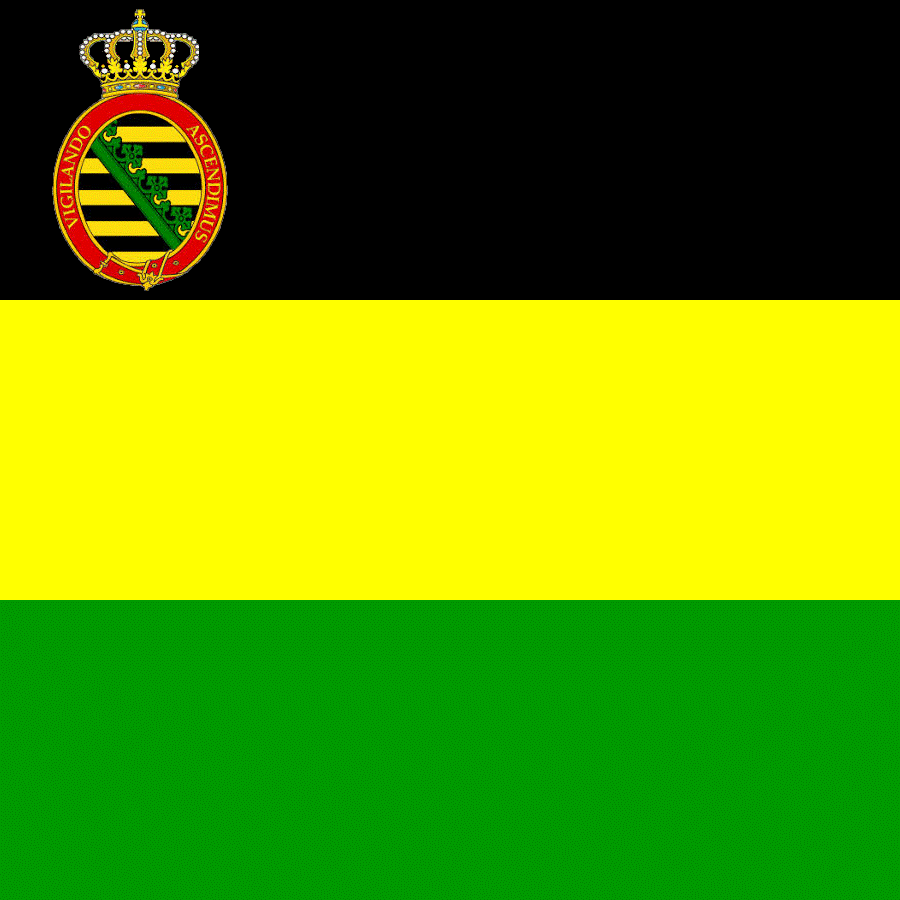
Grand Ducal Standard 1897-1903

Grand Ducal Standard 1903-1918

=== Dukes of Saxe-Weimar and Saxe-Eisenach, 1741–1809 ===
- Ernest Augustus I, 1741–1748; Duke of Saxe-Weimar since 1707
- Ernest Augustus II, 1748–1758
- Charles Augustus, 1758–1809, until 1775 under the regency of his mother Duchess Anna Amalia of Brunswick-Wolfenbüttel

=== Dukes of Saxe-Weimar-Eisenach, 1809–1815 ===
- Charles Augustus, 1809–1815; Duke of Saxe-Weimar and Saxe-Eisenach since 1758

=== Grand Dukes of Saxe-Weimar-Eisenach, 1815–1918 ===
- Charles Augustus, 1815–1828
- Charles Frederick, 1828–1853
- Charles Alexander, 1853–1901
- William Ernest, 1901–1918

== Economy ==
=== Agriculture ===
In 1895, 37.9% of the workforce were employed in the agriculture and forestry industries, 38.9% worked in the manufacturing sector, and 16.4% were employed in the service sector.

Until 1900, agriculture was the most important branch in the economy of the grand duchy. A total of 56% of the duchy's territory was used for agriculture, mainly in the districts Weimar and Neustadt and the exclaves Allstedt and Oldisleben in the Goldene Aue area.

The harvest of 1895 consisted of:

Crop	Area (km^{2})	Yield (metric tons)
Wheat	216	27,100
Rye	295	33,300
Barley	276	41,900
Oats	334	39,600
Potatoes	225	232,200
Hay	574	192,717
Fodder	92	152,400

Fruit was mainly grown in the Saale valley, around Jena and Bürgel. There was some viticulture north of Jena, between Dornburg and Camburg.

Stock breeding was also widespread. In 1892, there were 19,121 horses in the grand duchy, 119,720 cattle, 113,208 sheep, 122,974 pigs, 46,405 goats and 16,999 beehives.

Game was only found near Eisenach, in Eichenzell and in the Ilmenau exclave, where the grand duke's largest hunting ground was located on the banks of the Gabelbach. About 50% of the forests were state-owned (450 km^{2} [170 sq mi]). The dominant tree species were beech (in the Weimar district), pine (especially in the Neustadt district) and spruce (in the Eisenach district and around Ilmenau). The grand duchy's State Forestry Office was based in Eisenach.

=== Manufacturing Industries ===
A versatile array of manufacturing industries developed in the grand duchy. For example, in Bürgel and Ilmenau, there were porcelain factories (in all, there were 39 such factories in the country).

In Ilmenau and Jena, glass was made (in particular, in the Schott factories). The glass industry was specialized in industrial glass (for example measuring devices such as thermometers in the area around Ilmenau) and optical products, around Jena. In 1846, Carl Zeiss found a precision engineering and optical company that quickly developed into a world leader. In 1917, the company had 10000 employees. In 1889, Ernst Abbe founded the Carl-Zeiss-Stiftung, which became the sole share holder of the companies Carl Zeiss AG and Schott AG.

The textile industry was also important. It was concentrated in Apolda (mostly hosiery knitting mills) and Neustadt an der Orla. Other major textile plants could be found in Wenigenjena, Eisenach, Weida, Remda and Blankenhain. In 1895, the textile industry employed approximately 7000 people.

Ruhla was a center of the metalworking industry. The country's first car plant was built in 1895 in Eisenach. Chemical industries, such as a paint factory, could also be found in Eisenach. Furthermore, there were a paper mill in Oberweimar and a toy factory in Ilmenau. Wicker-work was manufactured in the Kuppenrhön area and pipes were made in Geisa. In 1895, there were 257 breweries in the grand duchy; the largest of these were in Apolda and Ilmenau.

=== Mining industry ===
Ilmenau and Ruhla were important mining centers in the Thuringian Forest. Around 1900, potash industry began to develop in the Werra valley, around Vacha and Berka/Werra. There were salt works in Creuzburg and Bad Sulza.

=== Trade ===
The major transport centers were Weimar and Eisenach. Many banks opened branch offices here. In 1895, there were 23 branch offices of savings banks in the grand duchy, and they were managing deposits totalling approximately 40 million Reichsmark.

The grand duchy was part of the Thuringian Toll Union, except for the exclaves Ostheim, Oldisleben, and Allstedt.

== Education ==
There was one state university in the grand duchy, the University of Jena, which was funded by Saxe-Weimar-Eisenach together with the other Thuringian states. There were several art and music schools in Weimar, and in Ilmenau, there was the Technische Universität Ilmenau, a privately owned university providing technical and scientific education. Gymnasiums existed in Weimar, Eisenach and Jena; Realschules were found in Weimar, Apolda, Jena, Eisenach, Neustadt and Ilmenau. In 1895, there were 462 primary schools, and any child would receive at least four years of primary education. Large libraries of 200000 volumes each were maintained in Weimar and Jena. In 1869, a State Museum was founded in Weimar.

== See also ==
- Ernestine duchies
- Thuringian states
