= Coat of arms of Saxe-Weimar-Eisenach =

National symbol

Grand Duchy of Saxe-Weimar-Eisenach
- Crest: Silver helm; crown
- Shield: Quarterly: the striped lion of Thuringia; the lion of the Margraviate of Meissen; the arms of the County of Henneberg and Estate of Arnshaugk; Lordship of Blankenhain and the arms of the Tautenburg estate. Above all an escutcheon for Saxony
- Supporters: Two golden lions
- Motto: VIGILANDO ASCENDIMUS ("We rise by being vigilant")
- Use: Ended 1918

The coat of arms of the Grand Duchy of Saxe-Weimar-Eisenach was created in 1815 when the area was raised to the title of Grand Duchy, and ended in 1918 with the transition of Saxe-Weimar-Eisenach into the new state of Thuringia. The full grand ducal style was Grand Duke of Saxe-Weimar-Eisenach, Landgrave in Thuringia, Margrave of Meissen, Princely Count of Henneberg, Lord of Blankenhayn, Neustadt and Tautenburg, and this is represented in the arms:

- In the first quarter, the striped lion of Thuringia;
- In the second quarter, the arms of the Margraviate of Meissen;
- In the third quarter, per pale the arms of the County of Henneberg and of Neustadt-Arnshaugk;
- In the fourth quarter, per pale the arms of the Lord of Blankenhayn (Blankenhain) and Tautenburg;
- Above all the arms of Saxony, as was tradition for the descendants of the Saxon line.

It was used on the Grand Ducal Standard c.1862 - c.1878.
