= Vacca =

Vacca may refer to:

- Vacca (surname)
- Vacca (grammarian), 6th-century grammarian
- Vacca (rapper) (born 1979), Italian rapper
- Lago della Vacca, lake in Lombardy, Italy
- Victorian Aboriginal Child and Community Agency in Victoria, Australia

== See also ==
- Vaca (disambiguation)
