= 1919 Saxe-Weimar-Eisenach state election =

German state election

The 1919 Saxe-Weimar-Eisenach state election was held on 9 March 1919 to elect the 42 members of the Landtag of the Free State of Saxe-Weimar-Eisenach.

== Results ==
| Party | Votes | % | Seats |
|---|---|---|---|
| Social Democratic Party of Germany | 72,730 | 40.35 | 16 |
| German Democratic Party | 38,924 | 21.60 | 10 |
| German National People's Party | 35,072 | 19.46 | 10 |
| Independent Social Democratic Party of Germany | 18,411 | 10.22 | 5 |
| German People's Party | 9,812 | 5.44 | 1 |
| Centre Party | 5,284 | 2.93 | 0 |
| Total | 180,233 | 100.00 | 42 |
| Registered voters/turnout | 267,563 | – | |
Source: Elections in the Weimar Republic
