= Otto Hammann =

German journalist

Otto Hammann (23 January 1852 in Blankenhain – 18 June 1928 in Fürstenberg/Havel) was a German journalist and a German Foreign Office official 1894–1916.

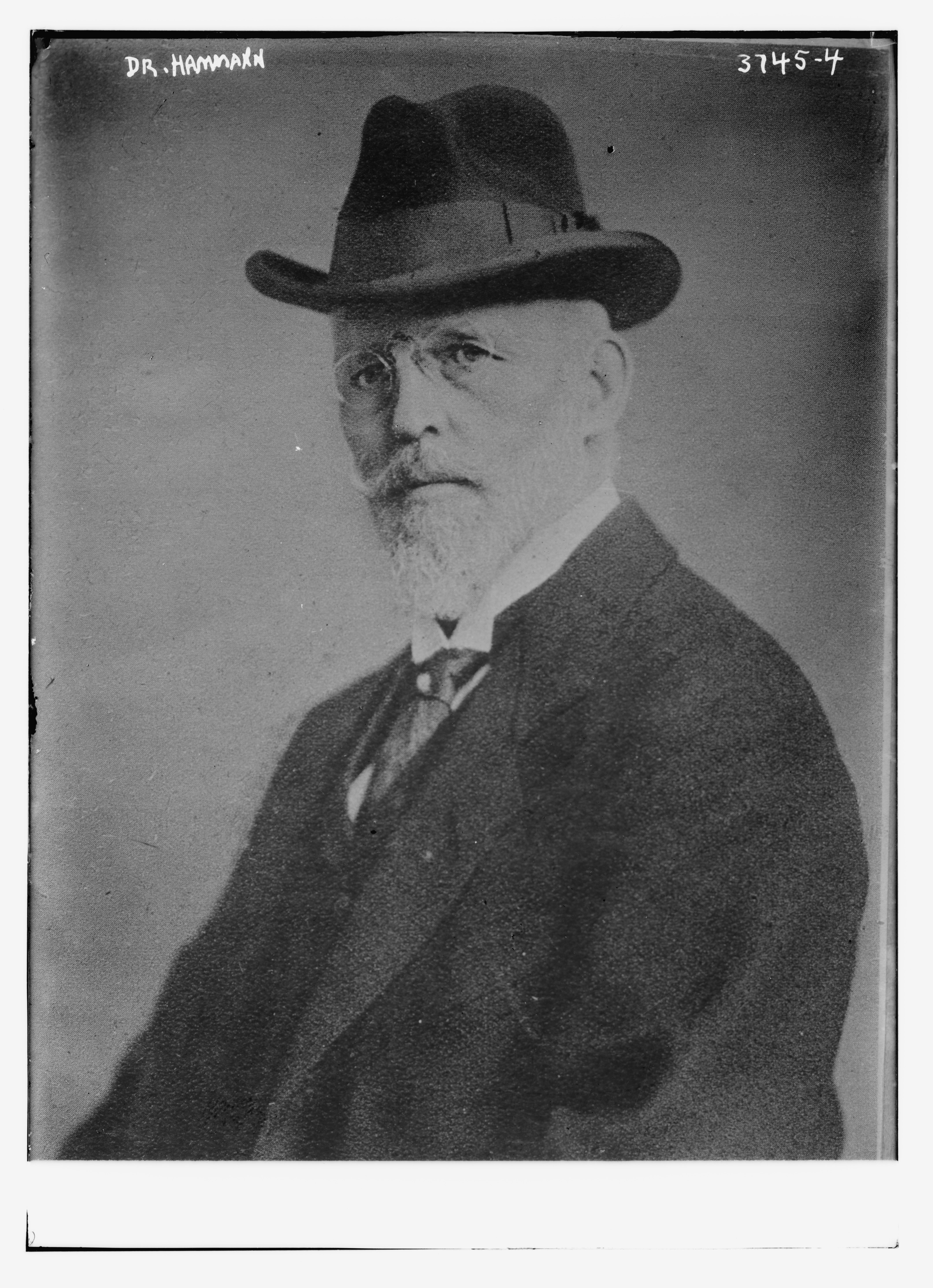
Dr. Otto Hammann

== Biography ==
Hammann was engaged in journalism from 1877 to 1893 and was appointed, in 1894, director of the Press Section of the German Foreign Office, a post which he continued to hold until 1916. Hammann was the trusted adviser of Chancellor Bernhard von Bülow. Hammann always kept an attentive eye upon public opinion as reflected or created in the press. He had personally played a leading part in the defensive campaign of the Imperial Chancellor, Leo von Caprivi, and the Foreign Secretary, Adolf Marschall von Bieberstein, in the early 1890s, against the Bismarckian opposition. Hammann's business was to inspire the German and, as far as possible, the foreign press in a sense favourable to German policy and above all to obtain full and accurate information with regard to the personality and circumstances of journalists.

== Works ==
Hammann's position enabled him to acquire a great deal of exclusive information with regard to the more secret ways of German policy, and he embodied a considerable portion of what he knew in the three volumes of reminiscences which he published after the Revolution: Der neue Kurs, Erinnerungen (1918), Zur Vorgeschichte des Weltkriegs and Um den Kaiser, Erinnerungen aus den Jahren 1906-1909 (1919).
