= Vaca =

Vaca may refer to:

== People ==
- Vaca (surname)

== Geography ==
- Vaca Mountains, a mountain range in Napa County, California
- Vaca Díez Province, Bolivia
- Vaca Mare River, a tributary of the Siriu River in Romania
- Vaca Mică River, a tributary of the Siriu River in Romania
- Mount Vaca, northern California
- Key Vaca, an island in the middle Florida Keys
- Vaca, the former name for Crișan village, Ribița Commune, Hunedoara County, Romania

== Other uses ==
- Vaca Valley Railroad, operated at Vacaville, California in the late 19th century
- VacA a Helicobacter pylori protein
- Cattle, vaca is the Spanish word for cattle.

== See also ==
- Vac (disambiguation)
- Vacha (disambiguation)
- Lavaca (disambiguation)
- Vacca (disambiguation)
- Vaka (disambiguation)
