= Lavaca =

Lavaca may stand for:

- Lavaca, Arkansas
- Lavaca County, Texas
- Lavaca River
- Port Lavaca, Texas
- Lavaca Bay

== See also ==
- la Vaca (disambiguation)
- Lavaka (disambiguation)
