= Wacha =

Wacha is a surname.

== People ==
Notable people with the surname include:

- Dinshaw Edulji Wacha (1844–1936), Indian politician
- Michael Wacha (born 1991), American baseball player
- Jennifer Danielle Wacha alias Jennifer Sky (born 1976), American actress
- Przemysław Wacha (born 1981), Polish badminton player
- Rolf Wacha (born 1981), German rugby player

== Places ==
- Wacha, Niger, commune in Niger

== See also ==
- Vácha
