= Vaka =

Vaka may refer to:

- "Vaka" (song), a 2003 song by Sigur Rós
- Vaka (sailing), in Polynesian multihull terminology, the main hull of a multihull vessel
- Vaka (TV series), a 2026 Swedish drama series
- Váka, the Hungarian name for Crişan village, Ribița Commune, Hunedoara County, Romania
- Vaka, a solo music project of Daniel Lidén

== People ==
=== Surname ===
- Filipo Palako Vaka (born 1970), Tongan boxer
- Joseph Wilson Vaka (born 1980), Tongan rugby union player
- Laveni Vaka (born 2001), American-born Tongan football (soccer) player
- Mani Vaka (1947–2007), Tongan boxer
- Saïmoni Vaka (born 1987), Fijian rugby union player
- Sam Vaka (born 1992), New Zealand rugby union player
- Trish Vaka (born 1986), New Zealand rugby union player and boxer

=== Given name ===
- Vaka Manupuna (born 1982), American football player

== Other uses ==
- Vaka Television, a Cook Island television network

== See also ==
- Te Vaka, an Oceanic music group
  - Te Vaka (album), 1996
- Vaca (disambiguation)
