= VAC =

VAC or Vac may refer to:

== Arts and entertainment ==
- Variety Artists Club of New Zealand
- Velvet Acid Christ, an industrial band
- Video Appeals Committee, appeals board against BBFC video classifications in the UK
- Visual Arts Centre, now part of La Trobe Institute, Bendigo, Australia
- Zambia National Visual Arts Council

== Business ==
- ValueAct Capital, American investment company
- Valve Amplification Company, audio component manufacturer
- Vologda Air Company, a Russian airline

== Government ==
- Veterans Affairs Canada, a federal department
- Veterans Affairs Council, a cabinet-level organization in Taiwan
- Voter Authority Certificate, type of voter identification in the UK

== Health ==
- Vaccinate Alaska Coalition
- Vacuum assisted closure wound therapy

== Sport ==
- Vác-Újbuda LTC, a football club based in Vác, Hungary
- Vívó és Atlétikai Club, a defunct Hungarian sports club

== Technology ==
- Valve Anti-Cheat, an anti-cheat tool for video games
- Vergence-accommodation conflict, a visual phenomenon associated with the use of stereoscopic devices
- Virtual Audio Cable, software to transfer audio
- Volts alternating current, a measure of electromagnetic force transmission

== Other uses ==
- Vác, a city in Hungary
  - Roman Catholic Diocese of Vác
- V Amphibious Corps, of World War II US Marine Corps
- Vāc, Sanskrit for "speech", also a Vedic goddess
- Pacific Central Station, Vancouver, British Columbia, Canada, station code

== See also ==
- VAK (disambiguation)
- Vaca (disambiguation)
- Vacha (disambiguation)
