= Lavaka (disambiguation) =

Lavaka is the Malagasy word for "hole", usually found on the side of a hill, is a type of erosional feature common in Madagascar. Lavaka may also refer to:

- Heamani Lavaka (1969–2024), Tongan rugby union player
- Lavaka, a Tongan nobility title, see Tupou VI

== See also ==
- Lavaca (disambiguation)
