= Vock =

Vock is a surname. Notable people with this surname include:

- Anna Vock (1885–1962), Swiss journalist and LGBT activist
- Armin Vock (born 1952), Swiss gymnast
- Harald Vock (1925–1998), German television producer and director
- Randy Vock (born 1994), Swiss wrestler

== See also ==
- Vack
