= Blankenhain =

- Town
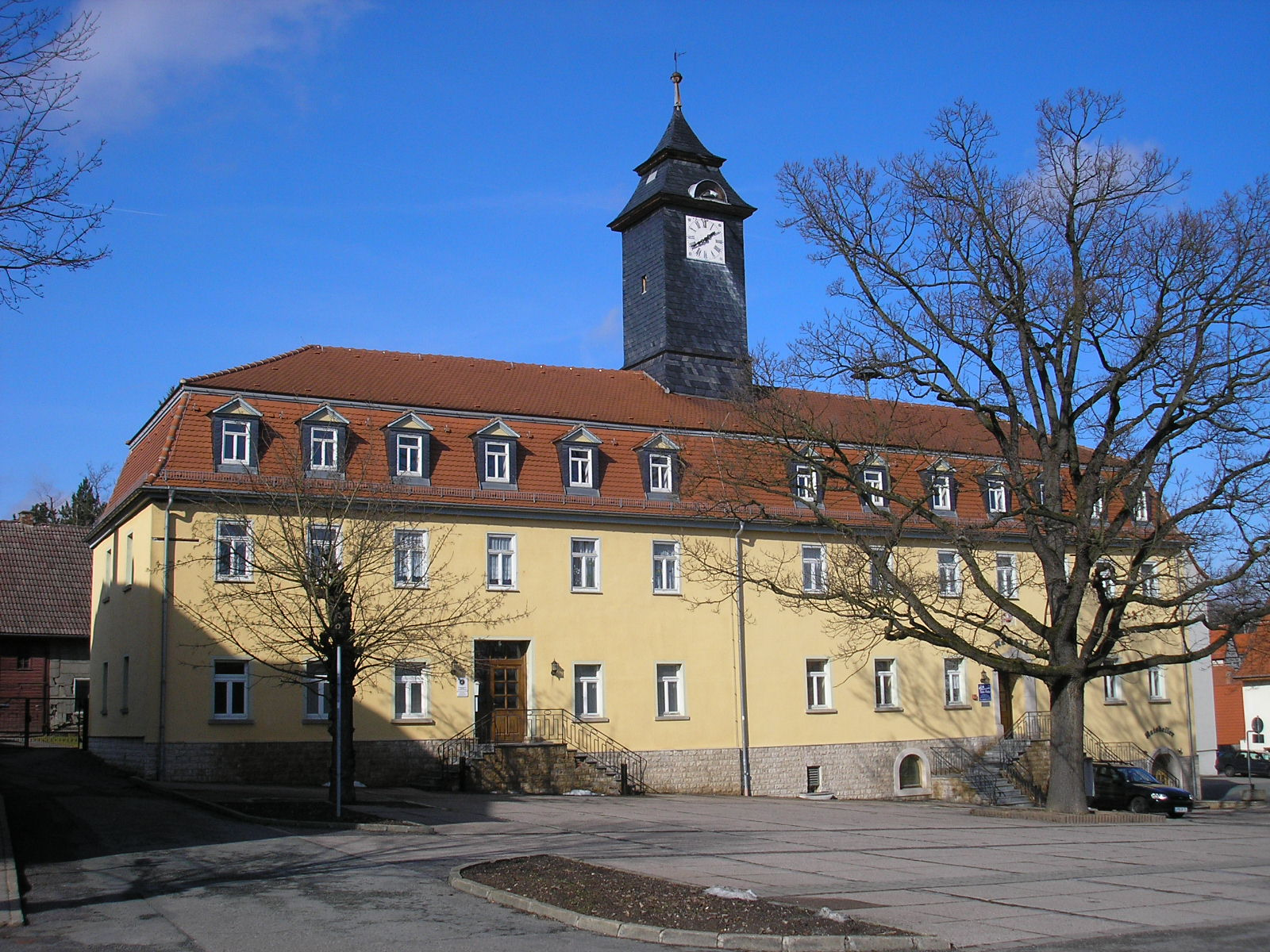
- Town hall

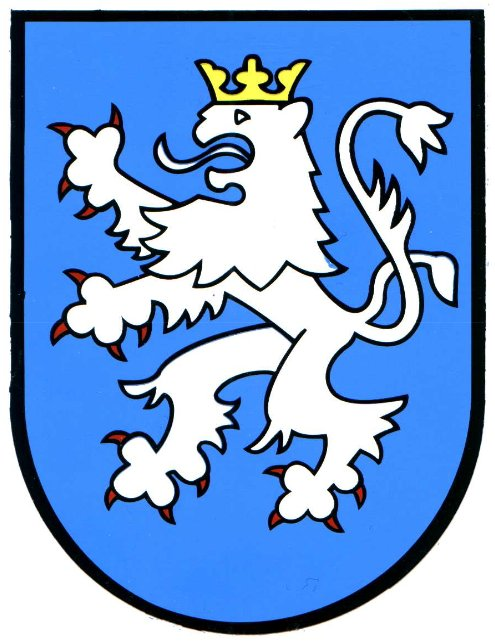
- Coat of arms

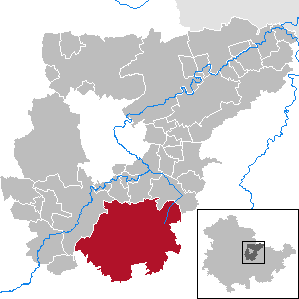
- Location of Blankenhain within Weimarer Land district
- Interactive map of Blankenhain
- Location within Germany Location within Thuringia
- Coordinates: 50°51′36″N 11°20′38″E
- Country: Germany
- State: Thuringia
- District: Weimarer Land
- Subdivisions: 23

Government
  - Mayor (2024–30): Jens Kramer (CDU)

Area
  - Total: 113.75 km^{2} (43.92 sq mi)
- Elevation: 370–390 m (1,210–1,280 ft)

Population (2025-12-31)
  - Total: 6,543
  - Density: 57.52/km^{2} (149.0/sq mi)
- Time zone: UTC+01:00 (CET)
  - Summer (DST): UTC+02:00 (CEST)
- Postal codes: 99444
- Dialling codes: 036459
- Vehicle registration: AP
- Website: www.blankenhain.de

Blankenhain (German pronunciation: [ˈblaŋkn̩ˌhaɪn]) is a town in the Weimarer Land district, in Thuringia, Germany. It is 14 km (8.7 miles) south of Weimar.

== History ==
Until the Napoleonic Wars, Blankenhain had been a part of the Duchy of Saxe-Weimar. After the Fourth Coalition's defeat at Jena and Auerstedt, Napoleon attached the Lordship of Blankenhain to the Principality of Erfurt, directly subordinate to himself as an "imperial state domain" (French: domaine réservé à l'empereur), separate from the Confederation of the Rhine (nominally a French protectorate set up to replace the now-defunct Holy Roman Empire), which the surrounding Thuringian states had joined.

After the Congress of Vienna, Erfurt was restored to Prussia on 21 June 1815, becoming the capital of one of the three districts (Regierungsbezirke) of the new Province of Saxony, but some southern and eastern parts of Erfurter lands joined Blankenhain in being transferred to the newly promoted Grand Duchy of Saxe-Weimar-Eisenach the following September.

Blankenhain remained within Saxe-Weimar-Eisenach through the era of the German Empire (1871–1918) and into the Weimar Republic until it merged with 7 of the 8 other Saxon duchies to form the Free State of Thuringia (German: Freistaat Thüringen). After being controlled briefly by the United States, from July 1945, the state of Thuringia came under the Soviet occupation zone, and was expanded to include parts of Prussian Saxony, including Erfurt, which became the new capital of Thuringia. In 1952, East Germany dissolved its states, and created districts (Bezirke) instead, with Blankenhain sitting within the rural district Kreis Weimar-Land, in Bezirk Erfurt. The State of Thuringia was restored with slightly altered borders during German reunification in 1990.

During the UEFA Euro 2024 tournament, the England national football team were based in Blankenhain.

=== Sons and daughters of the city ===
- Otto Hammann (1852–1928), jurist
- Jörg Schneider (born 1948), paleontologist
- Christina Grosse (born 1970), actress

=== People who are connected to Blankenhain ===
- Johann Christoph Bach (1689–1740), organist, cousin of Johann Sebastian Bach
- Max Burchartz (1887–1961), graphican and painter, lived for a long time in Blankenhain
- Wilhelm Hegeler (1870–1943), writer, lived for several years in Blankenhain
- Max Oehler (1881–1943), painter, had a garden in Blankenhain, painted the city and its surroundings
