= Vacha, Russia =

Vacha (Russian: Вача) is the name of several inhabited localities (work settlements and settlements) in Russia.

Urban localities

- Vacha, Nizhny Novgorod Oblast, a work settlement in Vachsky District of Nizhny Novgorod Oblast

Rural localities

- Vacha, Republic of Karelia, a settlement in Segezhsky District of the Republic of Karelia
