= Vacha (Verwaltungsgemeinschaft) =

Verwaltungsgemeinschaft in the district Wartburgkreis in Thuringia, Germany

Coordinates: 50.833°N 10.017°E

- Verwaltungsgemeinschaft
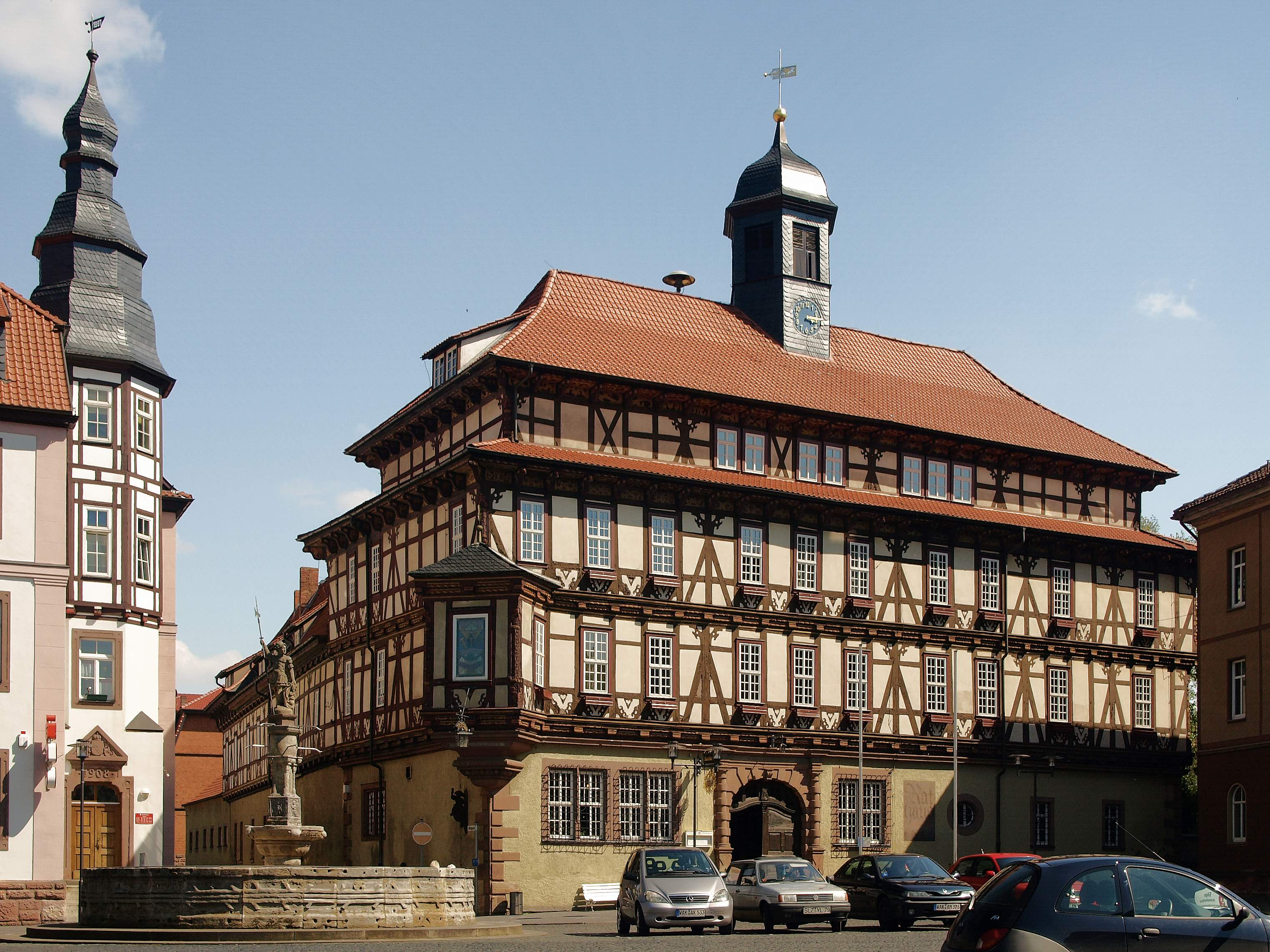
- Vacha town hall
- Interactive map of Vacha
- Country: Germany
- State: Thuringia
- District: Wartburgkreis

Vacha is a former municipal association (German: Verwaltungsgemeinschaft) in the district Wartburgkreis in Thuringia, Germany. The seat of the association was in Vacha. It was disbanded on 31 December 2013.

The municipal association Vacha consisted of the following municipalities:

1. Martinroda
2. Vacha
3. Völkershausen
4. Wölferbütt
