= Free State of Saxe-Weimar-Eisenach =

German state (1918–1920)

Coordinates: 50°58′52″N 11°19′46″E

Free State of Saxe-Weimar-Eisenach Freistaat Sachsen-Weimar-Eisenach
- 1918–1920
- Flag

- Saxe-Weimar-Eisenach within the German Empire

- Saxe-Weimar-Eisenach (6 main regions, in dark green) within the Thuringian States
- Capital: Weimar
- Government: Republic
- Historical era: Interwar period
  - German revolution of 1918–1919: 1918
  - Merged into Thuringia: 1920

Area
- 1919: 3,610 km^{2} (1,390 sq mi)

Population
  - 1919: 429,831
Preceded by	Succeeded by
Duchy of Saxe-Weimar-Eisenach	Thuringia
- Today part of: Germany

The Free State of Saxe-Weimar-Eisenach (German: Freistaat Sachsen-Weimar-Eisenach) was a small, short-lived (1918–1920) central German state during the early years of the Weimar Republic. It was formed following the dissolution of the Grand Duchy of Saxe-Weimar-Eisenach during the German revolution of 1918–1919. After Grand Duke William Ernest abdicated, Saxe-Weimar Eisenach transitioned peacefully into a republic. It became part of Thuringia when it was created on 1 May 1920.

== German revolution ==
The Grand Duchy of Saxe-Weimar-Eisenach (1809–1918), part of the Ernestine line of the House of Wettin, became a member state of the North German Confederation in 1866 and of the German Empire in 1871. It was a hereditary monarchy with a single-chamber Landtag (state parliament) and was ruled from 1901 to 1918 by Grand Duke William Ernest. It had three seats in the Empire's Reichstag and one in the Bundesrat.

The Grand Duchy collapsed during the revolution of 1918–1919, which brought down the German Empire and all of Germany's royal houses at the end of World War I. The revolution began in late October 1918 when rebellious sailors at Kiel set up a workers' and soldiers' council and in early November spread the revolt across the rest of Germany. Emperor Wilhelm II fled to Holland on 10 November, and councils quickly took power from the existing military, royal and civil authorities with little resistance or bloodshed.

The council movement reached Weimar on 8 November when an estimated 1,000 to 1,500 demonstrators, many of them recently recruited soldiers from nearby Jena, demanded and received weapons and ammunition from Weimar's garrison commander, freed imprisoned soldiers, occupied the railway station, postal, telephone and telegraph offices, and set up a soldiers' council. A workers' council followed the next day, and by evening Grand Duke William Ernest had been convinced to abdicate. On 10 November a provisional government dominated by members of the moderate Social Democratic Party (SPD) was set up with August Baudert as state commissioner.

The Grand Duke and his family went into exile at Allstedt, in a northern exclave of the Grand Duchy, on 10 November; six weeks later they settled at their estate at Heinrichau in Prussian Silesia. An agreement between the new government and William Ernest regarding his lands and other possessions was reached in October 1921.

== Founding ==
In January 1919, Baudert's government resigned from the workers' and soldiers' council. In the 9 March election for a new state parliament (Landtag), the SPD won 40% of the votes and the liberal German Democratic Party (DDP) 22%. The two parties formed a coalition government with Arnold Paulssen (DDP) and August Baudert (SPD) as state ministers. Their cabinet was made up of three state councilors (Staatsräte) from the SPD and two from the DDP.

On 15 May the Landtag approved a constitution for the Free State of Saxe-Weimar-Eisenach. It was based on a draft prepared by the Jena representative Eduard Rosenthal of the DDP and served as the model for the constitution of the future state of Thuringia. The government of Saxe-Weimar-Eisenach also played a key role in the discussion with the other Thuringian states to form the new state of Thuringia. It called together the representatives of the states to discuss conditions for the merger, and they handed the task of creating the basis for a unification agreement to Arnold Paulssen, whom they elected chairman of Thuringia's transitional government. The proposed agreement he drafted was formalized on 4 January 1920 after it had been approved by all of the Thuringian states except Coburg, which chose to merge with Bavaria.

The Kapp Putsch, a failed right-wing attempt to overthrow the German government in Berlin in March 1920, had bloody repercussions in Saxe-Weimar-Eisenach. Major General Gustav Hagenberg, commander of the Reichswehr brigade in Weimar and a supporter of the putsch, declared the government of the Free State deposed on 14 March. A clash between soldiers under his command and workers in front of Weimar's union hall (the Volkshaus) left nine dead and many more wounded. Due to resistance from workers and democratic politicians, Hagenberg was unable to seize control in Weimar and withdrew into Prussia.

== Formation of Thuringia ==
In late March 1919, representatives of the eight Thuringian states had met in Weimar to begin discussing plans to form a unified state. All except Coburg signed the “Community Agreement on the Merger of the Thuringian States” on 4 January 1920. Both houses of the Weimar Republic's parliament subsequently passed a federal law officially creating the State of Thuringia with its capital at Weimar. When the law became effective on 1 May 1920, the Free State of Saxe-Weimar-Eisenach ceased to exist as a sovereign federal state, although it remained intact territorially until Thuringia's municipal and district reforms of 1 October 1922. Erfurt replaced Weimar as the capital of Thuringia after World War II (in 1948).
