= Wölferbütt =

- Ortsteil of Vacha
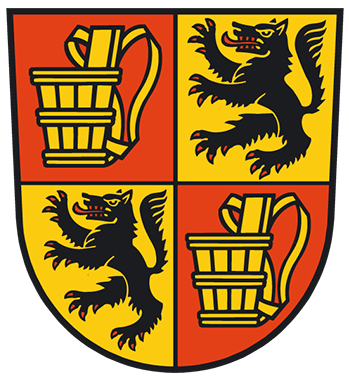
- Coat of arms
- Interactive map of Wölferbütt
- Location within Germany Location within Thuringia
- Coordinates: 50°46′7″N 10°3′15″E
- Country: Germany
- State: Thuringia
- District: Wartburgkreis
- Town: Vacha

Area
  - Total: 4.6 km^{2} (1.8 sq mi)
- Elevation: 400 m (1,300 ft)

Population (2012-12-31)
  - Total: 376
  - Density: 82/km^{2} (210/sq mi)
- Time zone: UTC+01:00 (CET)
  - Summer (DST): UTC+02:00 (CEST)
- Postal codes: 36404
- Dialling codes: 036965
- Vehicle registration: WAK

Wölferbütt (German pronunciation: [ˈvœlfɐˌbʏt]) is a village and a former municipality in the Wartburgkreis district of Thuringia, Germany. Since 31 December 2013, it is part of the town Vacha.
