= Vaazhkai =

Vaazhkai or Vazhkai (transl. Life) may refer to:

- Vaazhkai (1949 film), an Indian Tamil-language film directed by A. V. Meiyappan
- Vaazhkai (1984 film), an Indian Tamil-language film directed by C. V. Rajendran
- Vazhkai (TV series), an Indian Tamil-language TV drama
