= Lago della Vacca =

Lake in Lombardy, Italy

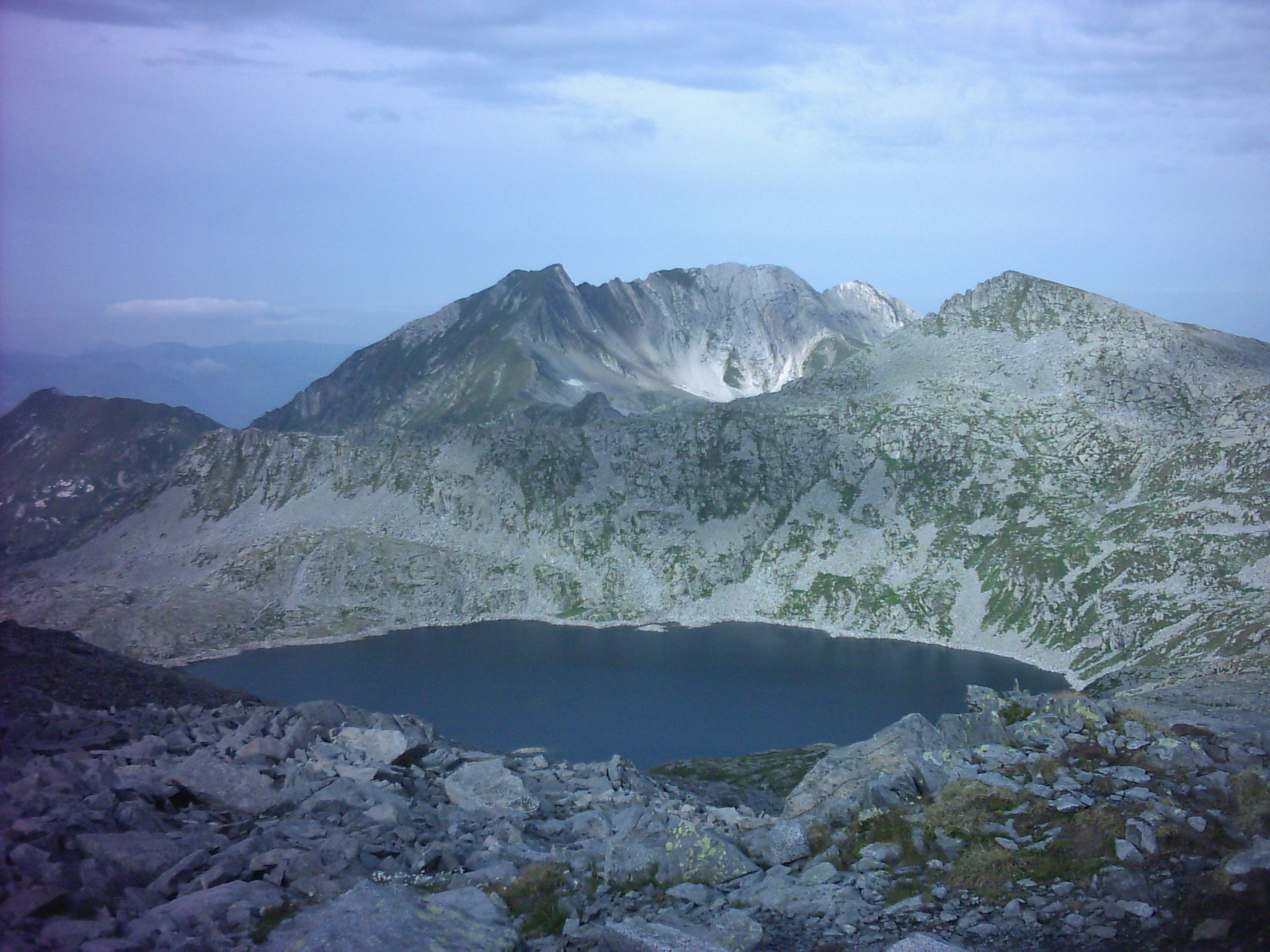

- Location within Lombardy
- Location: Province of Brescia, Lombardy
- Coordinates: 45°57′17″N 10°26′19″E
- Primary inflows: none
- Primary outflows: Rio Laione
- Basin countries: Italy
- Surface area: 0.256 km^{2} (0.099 sq mi)
- Surface elevation: 2,358 m (7,736 ft)

Lago della Vacca is an artificial lake in the Caffaro Valley in the Province of Brescia, Lombardy, Italy, west of Cornone di Blumone. At an elevation of 2358 m, its surface area is 0.256 km^{2}.

== Etymology ==
It owes its name to a curious rock formation located nearby at the Passo della Vacca (vacca in Italian means cow), whose shape resembles a large bovine.

== Geography ==
The lake lies in a glacial basin at the southern end of the Adamello mountain range, surrounded by peaks exceeding 2,500 meters. The lake has no real tributaries: it's supplied by the summer rainfall that falls in the drainage basin and by the melting of the snow covers the slopes of the surrounding mountains in the winter period between April and June. The only outflow is the Rio Laione (or Lajone), a tributary of the Caffaro River. The average volume of water contained in the reservoir is 2.4 million cubic meters.

The dam of Lago della Vacca is a concrete structure, known as a gravity dam. It was completed in 1927. The main use of the reservoir is the production of electricity: it feeds the underlying Gaver hydroelectric power plant.
