= Vácha =

Vácha is a Czech masculine surname, its feminine counterpart is Váchová. It may refer to:

== Vácha ==
- Karel Vácha (born 1970), Czech footballer
- Ladislav Vácha (1899–1943), Czech gymnast and Olympic champion
- Lukáš Vácha (born 1989), Czech football midfielder

== Váchová ==
- Lucie Váchová (born 1984), Czech beauty pageant
- Marcela Váchová (born 1953), Czech artistic gymnast

== See also ==
- Wacha
