= Valve Amplification Company =

Audio electronics supplier in Sarasota, Florida

Valve Amplification Company (VAC) is a U.S. supplier of high end audio electronics, principally utilizing vacuum tube technology. It was founded in 1990 by Kevin Hayes (b. 1959) and Channing W. Hayes (1923–2009). A Florida corporation, as of 2011 it is located in Sarasota, Florida, U.S.

It is well known for having produced the Marantz Classic series of amplifiers for Marantz Japan from 1996 to 1998 (Marantz Model 7 / 7C, Model 8B, Model 9), as well as the VAC-designed Model 66 integrated amplifier. In addition, it redeveloped and produced the first 200 recreations of the LA-2A leveling amplifier for Universal Audio in 1998.

== Company history ==
VAC was founded in 1990 by Kevin Hayes and his father, Channing W. Hayes in Sarasota, Florida. The first products were the PA45 and PA90 power amplifiers, designed jointly. Beginning with their second product, the CPA1 / CLA1 preamplifier, designs are largely the work of Kevin Hayes, who functions as chief engineer.

VAC continued to operate in Florida until the beginning of the Marantz Classic project, the production phase of which commenced in Durham, NC in January 1996. VAC returned its administrative and sales operations to Sarasota, FL in September 2001.

On June 10, 2014, Kevin Hayes was issued U.S. Patent 8,749,310 for "amplifier bias control". This patent covers the only known technique for observing the true underlying quiescent current (idle current) of an output tube (or transistor) under dynamic signal conditions, and then holding it to the stable target value with a precision of 99% or better. It is the only 'auto bias' system in which the volume and character of the music being played does not alter the idle point of the tube. It is incorporated in VAC power amplifiers as the iQ Intelligent Continuous Automatic Bias System. In addition, the iQ system defends against short circuit tubes, prevents gas current run away tubes, indicates weakening tubes, and minimizes noise and distortion. Current iQ models are the VAC Statement 450 iQ and Signature 200 iQ.

VAC is privately held.

== Notable products ==
- PA45 & PA90 power amplifier, 1990–1997
- Renaissance Series (R30/30, R30/70, R70/70, R140), 1993–2009
- Phi Beta 110i integrated amplifier, 2004–2008
- Signature Preamplifier, 1999–present
- Avatar Series integrated amplifier, 1998–2008
- Phi 200 power amplifier, 2007–present
- Phi 300 Series power amplifier, 2006–present
- Statement 450 power amplifier, 2010–present
