= Vack =

Vack is a surname. Notable people with the surname include:

- Bert le Vack (1887–1931), English motorcycle racer
- Peter Vack (born 1986), American actor, writer, director, and producer

== See also ==
- Hack (name)
- Lack (surname)
- Vock
