= Albrecht VII of Schwarzburg-Rudolstadt =

Count of Schwarzburg-Rudolstadt (1537–1605)

Albrecht VII, Count of Schwarzburg-Rudolstadt
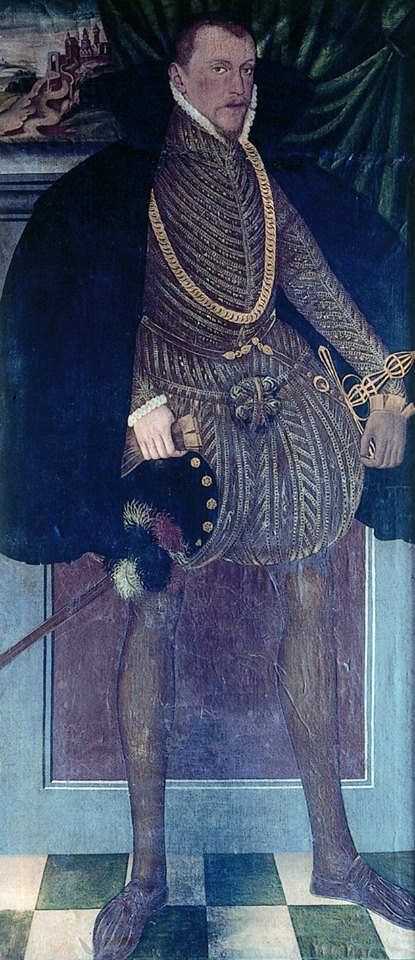
- Albrecht VII of Schwarzburg-Rudolstadt
- Born: 16 January 1537; Sondershausen
- Died: 10 April 1605 (aged 68); Rudolstadt
- Noble family: House of Schwarzburg
- Spouses: Juliana of Nassau-Dillenburg; Albertine Elisabeth of Leiningen-Westerburg
- Father: Günther XL, Count of Schwarzburg-Blankenburg
- Mother: Elisabeth zu Ysenburg-Büdingen in Birstein

Albrecht VII, Count of Schwarzburg-Rudolstadt (16 January 1537 – 10 April 1605) was Count of Schwarzburg and founder of the Line of Schwarzburg-Rudolstadt, which later received the title of Prince.

== Early life ==
He was the youngest of the surviving sons of Günther XL, Count of Schwarzburg-Blankenburg and his wife Countess Elisabeth zu Ysenburg-Büdingen-Birstein (1508–1572).

== Biography ==
His father, Günther XL, had united all of the Schwarzburg possessions. After he died in 1552, the county inherited by his four surviving sons, Günther XLI, John Günther I, William I and Albrecht VII, who divided their country in 1572. After the deaths of childless Günther XLI in 1583 and Wilhelm I in 1597, his possessions were divided between the still living brothers Johann Günther and Albrecht VII. This partition became the beginning of two lines of the house of Schwarzburg, Schwarzburg-Rudolstadt and Schwarzburg-Sondershausen, both of which existed until the post-World War I major governmental changes of 1918.

Albrecht, studied at several German universities and in Padua. From 1557 he resided at the court of the Prince of Orange-Nassau. He served from 1563 under his brother Günther XLI in the army of King of Denmark and from 1573 lived in Rudolstadt.

== Family and children ==
He was married twice. Firstly, on 14 June 1575 he married Countess Juliana of Nassau-Dillenburg, daughter of Count William I of Nassau-Dillenburg and had the following children:

1. Charles Günther, Count of Schwarzburg-Rudolstadt (6 November 1576 – 24 September 1630)
2. Elisabeth Juliane (1 January 1578 – 28 March 1658)
3. Sophie (1 March 1579 – 24 August 1630), married on 30 March 1595 to Count Jobst II of Barby-Mühlingen
4. Magdalene (12 April 1580 – 22 April 1632), married on 22 May 1597 to Henry II, Count of Reuss-Gera
5. Louis Günther I, Count of Schwarzburg-Rudolstadt (27 May 1581 – 4 November 1646)
6. Albert Günther I, Count of Schwarzburg-Rudolstdat (8 August 1582 – 20 January 1634)
7. Anna Sybille (14 March 1584 – 22 August 1623), married on 15 November 1612 to Count Christian Günther I of Schwarzburg-Sondershausen
8. Katharina Maria (13 July 1585 – 19 January 1659)
9. Katharina Susanna (13 February 1587 – 19 April 1662)
10. Henry Günther, died young in 1589

Secondly, on 2 March 1591 he married Countess Albertine Elisabeth of Leiningen-Westerburg (1568–1617), daughter of Count Reinhard II von Leiningen-Westerburg (1530–1584) and his wife, Countess Ottilia von Manderscheid-Blankenheim-Keyll (1536–1597). The marriage was childless.

== Sources ==
- F. Apfelstedt: Das Haus Kevernburg-Schwarzburg von seinem Ursprunge bis auf unsere Zeit, Arnstadt 1890
- Dr. Kamill von Behr: Genealogie der in Europa regierenden Fürstenhäuser, Leipzig 1870
