= House of Schwarzburg =

Noble family of Thuringia, Germany

Schwarzburg
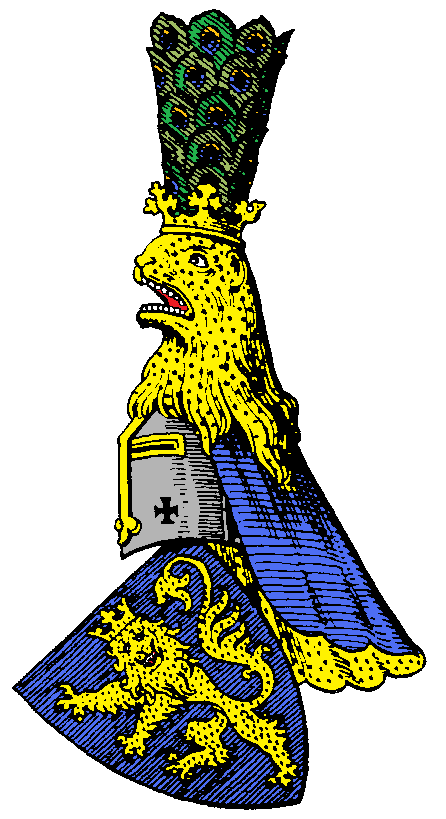
- Country: Schwarzburg-Rudolstadt, Schwarzburg-Sondershausen
- Founded: 12th century
- Founder: Sizzo I, Count of Schwarzburg
- Final ruler: Prince Günther Victor
- Titles: Count, Prince
- Dissolution: 1971; 55 years ago (male-line), 1984; 42 years ago
- Deposition: 1918; 108 years ago

Coat of arms of the Schwarzburg family

The House of Schwarzburg was one of the oldest noble families of Thuringia, which is located in modern-day Central Germany. Upon the death of Prince Friedrich Günther in 1971, a claim to the headship of the house passed under Semi-Salic primogeniture to his elder sister, Princess Marie Antoinette of Schwarzburg who married Friedrich Magnus V, Count of Solms-Wildenfels. Reigning over the County of Schwarzburg and founded by Sizzo I of Schwarzburg (died 1160), the family split in the 16th century into the lines of Schwarzburg-Sondershausen and Schwarzburg-Rudolstadt, with the Sondershausen line dying out in 1909.

== Family history ==
The County of Schwarzburg was a state of the Holy Roman Empire from 1195 to 1595, when it was partitioned into Schwarzburg-Rudolstadt and Schwarzburg-Sondershausen. It was ruled by counts from the House of Schwarzburg. Schwarzburg Castle was first mentioned in a 1071 deed. In 1123 Count Sizzo III of Käfernburg (Kevernburg), mentioned by the medieval chronicler Lambert of Hersfeld and according to the Annalista Saxo a grandson of Prince Yaropolk Izyaslavich of Turov by his mother, rebuilt the castle calling himself a "Count of Schwarzburg". Sizzo also established Georgenthal Abbey and in 1157, he accompanied Emperor Frederick I Barbarossa during his campaign against High Duke Bolesław IV the Curly of Poland.

In 1197, Sizzo's grandson Henry II divided the common heritage with his brother Günther III and made Schwarzburg Castle his residence. His territory then also comprised the nearby castle of Blankenburg.

The most famous family member is Günther XXI von Schwarzburg. In 1349, he was elected as German king by the majority of electors. But, due to waning support, he renounced some months later and died shortly after.

The Schwarzburg lands were again divided among his successors until in 1538 when Count Günther XL the Rich was able to unite the territories including Frankenhausen and Rudolstadt under his rule. He was succeeded by his eldest son Günther XLI. However, after his death in 1583, his younger brothers again divided the county: John Günther I received the territory around Arnstadt, later called Schwarzburg-Sondershausen, while Albrecht VII inherited the lands of Schwarzburg-Rudolstadt. The partition was finally confirmed by the 1599 Treaty of Stadtilm.

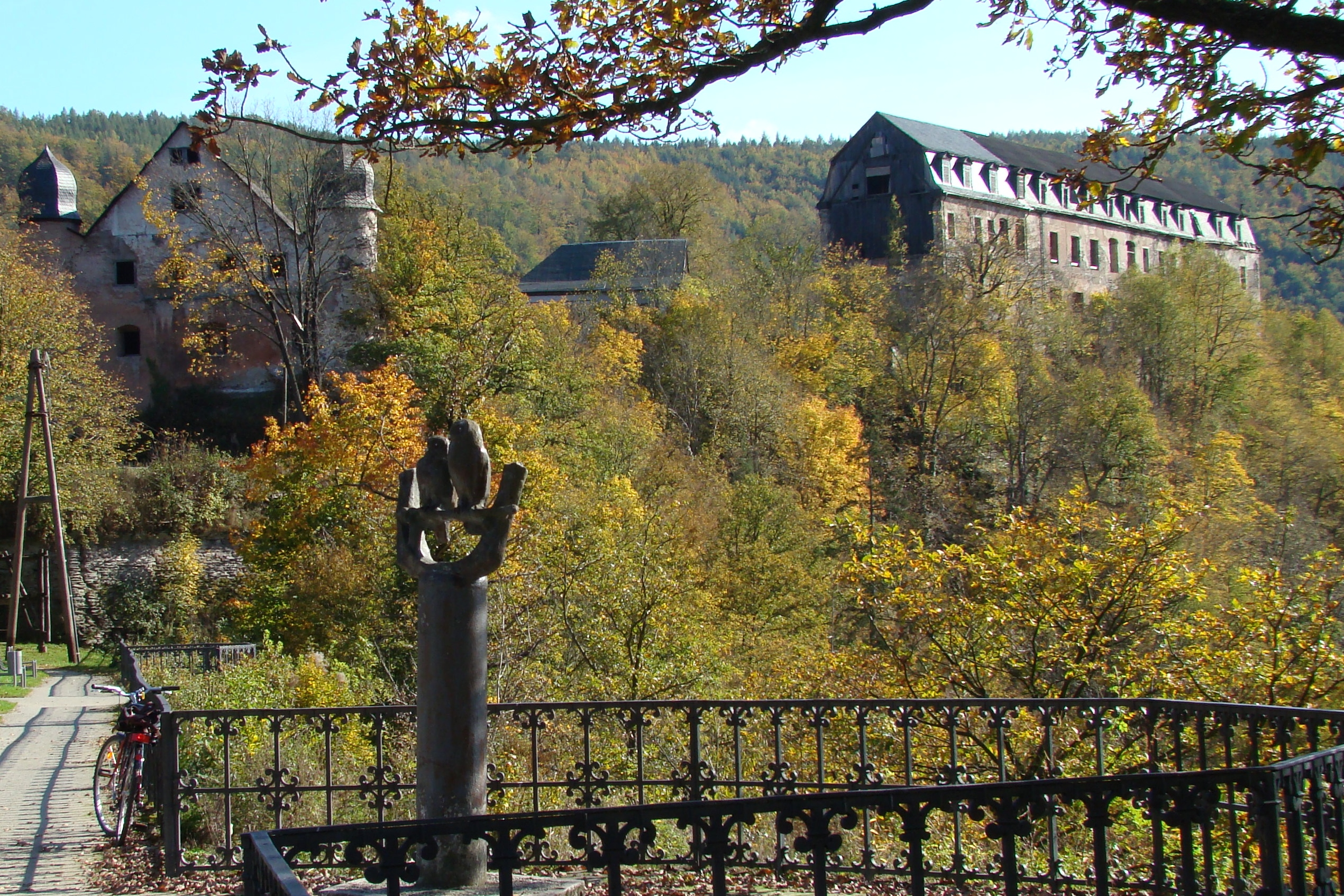
The castle at Schwarzburg. The building is being renovated now.

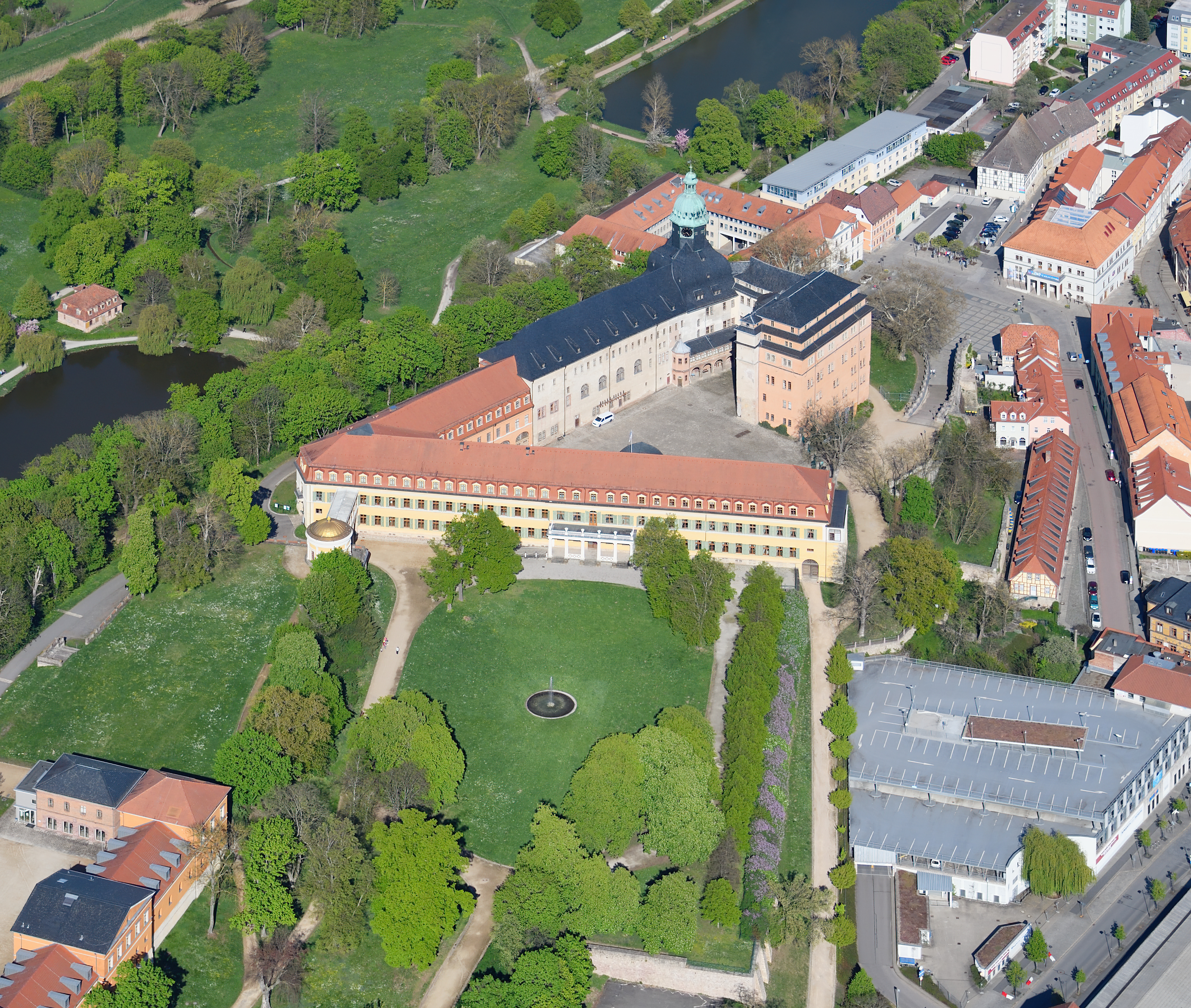
Sondershausen Palace.

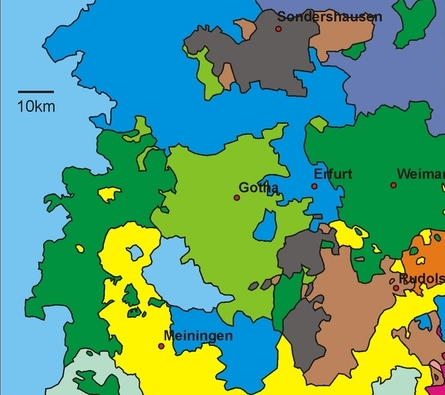
The Schwarzburg principalities in 1910
Schwarzburg-Rudolstadt
Schwarzburg-Sondershausen

== Rulers of Schwarzburg ==
=== House of Schwarzburg ===
Partitions of Schwarzburg under Schwarzburg rule

Note:Below it is presented a simplified organisation of the Schwarzburg lands. Some particularities of certain feuds are explained in footnotes.

Property of the comital family of Loccum-Hallermund
County of Schwarzburg (1030-1320)	County of Käfernburg; 1st creation: 1070-1118; 2nd creation: 1160-1184
County of Hallermund (1197-1411) (inherited)
County of Wiehe (1223-1338)
County of Blankenburg (1278-1538)	County of Arnstadt (1st creation) (1275-1306)	County of Käfernburg (3rd creation) (1223-1386)
County of Leutenberg (with Schwarzburg half 1) (1320-1564)	County of Wachsenburg (with Schwarzburg half 2) (1320-1461)	County of Arnstadt (2nd creation) (1324-1357)
County of Sondershausen (1st creation) (1338-1390)	Annexed to Weimar- Orlamünde
County of Schwarzburg (half 1) (1358-1399)	County of Schwarzburg (half 2) (1355-1450)	County of Wachsenburg (1320-1406)
Annexed to Meissen
County of Leutenberg (1320-1564)	(Sondershausen line from 1390)
Sold to Brunswick- Lüneburg
County of Sondershausen (2nd creation) (1476-1537)	County of Arnstadt (3rd creation) (1488-1564)
County of Schwarzburg (1564-1571) (Arnstadt line)
County of Frankenhausen (1571-1597)	County of Rudolstadt (1571-1710)	County of Sondershausen (1571-1697)	County of Arnstadt (5th creation) (1571-1697) Raised to: Principality of Arnstadt (1697-1716)
Raised to: Principality of Rudolstadt (1710-1909)	Raised to: Principality of Sondershausen (1697-1909)
Principality of Schwarzburg (1909-1918) (Rudolstadt line)

Table of rulers

==== Table of rulers ====
Note: There are two manners for numbering the rulers of this noble family: birth numbers or regnal numbers. Albeit the birth number is more commonly used, the table uses the sequential regnal numbers presented in Stammliste des Hauses Schwarzburg, to avoid confusion or holes in the counting. According to this alternative numbering, there's a different counting for Schwarzburg, Käfernburg (from 1223 onwards) and Hallermund (as an already existing county which came into the family by marriage). However, even this alternative counting is not perfect: it counts only the ruling members, but by birth order, which means that people with higher count may start to rule first than others. These cases will be pointed out in the table.

Ruler		Born	Reign	Ruling part	Consort	Death	Notes
Sizzo I		c.1000? Son of Sizzo or Günther	c.1030-1050	County of Schwarzburg	Unknown at least one child	c.1050 aged 49–50?	Probably the founder of the family. Sometimes attributed to his possible father, Günther.
Sizzo II		c.1030? Son of Sizzo I	c.1050-1118	County of Schwarzburg	Unknown at least one child	c.1118 aged 77–78?	
Günther I		c.1050? Son of Sizzo II	c.1070-1109	County of Käfernburg	Matilda Yaropolkovna of Turov-Pinsk after 1087 two children	c.1109 aged 58–59?	Cited as Count of Käfernburg, and predeceased his father.
Sizzo III		1093; Son of Günther I and Matilda Yaropolkovna of Turov-Pinsk	1109-1118	County of Käfernburg	Gisela of Berg (d.20 March 1142) c.1133 four children	19 June 1160 aged 66–67	Reunited Schwarzburg after the death of his grandfather, Sizzo II.
Sizzo III		1093; Son of Günther I and Matilda Yaropolkovna of Turov-Pinsk	1118 – 19 June 1160	County of Schwarzburg	Gisela of Berg (d.20 March 1142) c.1133 four children	19 June 1160 aged 66–67	Reunited Schwarzburg after the death of his grandfather, Sizzo II.
Henry I		1130; First son of Sizzo III and Gisela of Berg	19 June 1160 – 26 July 1184	County of Schwarzburg	A lady Winzenburg; 1170 one child	26 July 1184 aged 53–54	Children of Sizzo III, divided the inheritance. After Henry I's death, his brother reunited Schwarzburg once more.
Günther II		1135; Second son of Sizzo III and Gisela of Berg	19 June 1160 – 26 July 1184	County of Käfernburg	Agnes of Saarbrücken four children Adelaide of Loccum-Hallermund; 1178 three children	1197 aged 31–32	Children of Sizzo III, divided the inheritance. After Henry I's death, his brother reunited Schwarzburg once more.
Günther II		1135; Second son of Sizzo III and Gisela of Berg	26 July 1184 – 1197	County of Schwarzburg	Agnes of Saarbrücken four children Adelaide of Loccum-Hallermund; 1178 three children	1197 aged 31–32	Children of Sizzo III, divided the inheritance. After Henry I's death, his brother reunited Schwarzburg once more.
Henry II the Elder		c.1160 First son of Günther II and Agnes of Saarbrücken	1197 – 20 February 1236	County of Schwarzburg	Irmgard of Weimar-Orlamünde; 1211 seven children	20 February 1236 aged 75–76?	Children of Günther II, divided their inheritance. Gunther III co-ruled with his older brother Henry until 1216. Ludolf inherited Hallermund through his mother.
Günther III		c.1160 Second son of Günther II and Agnes of Saarbrücken	1197-1216	County of Schwarzburg	Dietburg of Anhalt (1169-1228) two children	1223 aged 62–63?	Children of Günther II, divided their inheritance. Gunther III co-ruled with his older brother Henry until 1216. Ludolf inherited Hallermund through his mother.
Günther III		c.1160 Second son of Günther II and Agnes of Saarbrücken	1216-1223	County of Käfernburg	Dietburg of Anhalt (1169-1228) two children	1223 aged 62–63?	Children of Günther II, divided their inheritance. Gunther III co-ruled with his older brother Henry until 1216. Ludolf inherited Hallermund through his mother.
Ludolf II		1180; Son of Günther II and Adelaide of Loccum-Hallermund	1197 – 15 November 1256	County of Hallermund	Unknown four children Kunigunde of Pyrmont one child	15 November 1256 aged 75–76?	Children of Günther II, divided their inheritance. Gunther III co-ruled with his older brother Henry until 1216. Ludolf inherited Hallermund through his mother.
Henry III the Younger		1219/20; First son of Henry IIand Irmgard of Weimar-Orlamünde	20 February 1236 – 1258/9	County of Schwarzburg	Sophie of Hohnstein c.15 March 1247 one child	1258/59 aged 38–40	Children of Henry II, divided their inheritance, but the childless death of Henry III made possible for Gunther IV to reunite the land once more.
Günther IV		1219/20; Second son of Henry IIand Irmgard of Weimar-Orlamünde	20 February 1236 – 1258/9	County of Blankenburg	Sophia nine children	1275/78 aged 38–40	Children of Henry II, divided their inheritance, but the childless death of Henry III made possible for Gunther IV to reunite the land once more.
Günther IV		1219/20; Second son of Henry IIand Irmgard of Weimar-Orlamünde	1258/9-1275/8	County of Schwarzburg	Sophia nine children	1275/78 aged 38–40	Children of Henry II, divided their inheritance, but the childless death of Henry III made possible for Gunther IV to reunite the land once more.
Günther IV		c.1200? First son of Günther III and Dietburg of Anhalt	1223-1268/9	County of Käfernburg	Matilda of Beichlingen before 10 December 1254 two children	1268/9 aged 68–69?	Children of Gunther III of Schwarzburg, divided their inheritance at Kafernburg.
Albert I		c.1200? Second son of Günther III and Dietburg of Anhalt	1223-1255	County of Wiehe	Unknown five children	c.1255 aged 54–55	Children of Gunther III of Schwarzburg, divided their inheritance at Kafernburg.
Albert II		c.1240? First son of Albert I	1255-c.1285	County of Wiehe	Unmarried	c.1285 aged 44–45?	Children of Albert I, divided their inheritance.
Frederick		c.1240? Second son of Albert I	1255-1312	County of Wiehe	Elisabeth of Neuenburg before 8 July 1280 two children	1312 aged 71–72?	Children of Albert I, divided their inheritance.
Berthold		c.1240? Third son of Albert I	1255 – 7 August 1312	County of Wiehe (at Rabenswald)	Wilibirg of Helfenstein; 1277 no children	7 August 1312 aged 71–72?	Children of Albert I, divided their inheritance.
Gisela		c.1240? Daughter of Albert I	1255-1278	County of Wiehe (at Hardegg)	Burchard VI, Burgrave of Magdeburg c.1260? at least one child	1278 aged 37–38?	Children of Albert I, divided their inheritance.
Rabenswald rejoined Wiehe; Hardegg annexed to Magdeburg
Ludolf III		c.1200? Son of Ludolf II and Kunigunde of Pyrmont	15 November 1256 – 1266	County of Hallermund	Jutta of Hoya six children	1266 aged 65–66?	It's possible that, after his death, his children divided the county.
Wilbrand III		1250? First son of Ludolf III and Jutta of Hoya	1266-1280	County of Hallermund (half 1)	Adelaide of Adenoys five children	1280 aged 29–30?	Sons of Ludolf III, possibly divided the county. Ludolf IV became canon at Hildesheim in 1275, possibly abdicating from the co-ruling in that year.
Ludolf IV		1250? Second son of Ludolf III and Jutta of Hoya	1266-1275	County of Hallermund (halves 1 and 2?)	Unmarried	c.1291 aged 40–41?	Sons of Ludolf III, possibly divided the county. Ludolf IV became canon at Hildesheim in 1275, possibly abdicating from the co-ruling in that year.
Gerhard I the Elder		1250? Third son of Ludolf III and Jutta of Hoya	1266-1326	County of Hallermund (half 2)	Unknown seven children Gerburg of Homburg before 14 September 1317 two children	1326 aged 75–76?	Sons of Ludolf III, possibly divided the county. Ludolf IV became canon at Hildesheim in 1275, possibly abdicating from the co-ruling in that year.
Günther V the Elder		c.1230? Son of Günther IV and Matilda of Beichlingen	1269-1273/5	County of Käfernburg	Matilda of Schwarzburg c.1250? four children	1273/5 aged 43–45?	
Günther VI the Elder		c.1250? First son of Günther V and Matilda of Schwarzburg	1273/5 – 1289	County of Käfernburg (with County of Arnstadt (half 1))	Sophia of Lüchow twelve children	February/March 1289 aged 38–39?	Sons of Günther V, divided their inheritance.
Günther VII the Younger		c.1250? Second son of Günther V and Matilda of Schwarzburg	1273/5 – 10 June 1302	County of Arnstadt (half 2)	Adelaide of Schwarzburg c.1275? two children	10 June 1302 aged 51–52?	Sons of Günther V, divided their inheritance.
Günther V		c.1235 First son of Günther IV and Sophia	1275/8-1292/3	County of Schwarzburg	Irmgard nine children Helena of Saxe-Lauenburg; 1283 no children	1292/3 aged 56–57?	Children of Günther IV, divided their inheritance.
Henry IV		c.1235 Second son of Günther IV and Sophia	1275/8-1287	County of Blankenburg	Sofia Daniilovna of Galicia-Volhynia; 1259 two children	1287 aged 51–52?	Children of Günther IV, divided their inheritance.
Gerhard II the Younger		c.1270? First son of Wilbrand III and Adelaide of Adenoys	1280-1345/6	County of Hallermund (half 1)	Elisabeth of Everstein-Polle thirteen children	1345/6 aged 75–76?	Children of Wilbrand III, ruled jointly.
Wilbrand IV		c.1270? Second son of Wilbrand III and Adelaide of Adenoys	1280-1301	County of Hallermund (half 1)	Unmarried	c.1301 aged 75–76?	Children of Wilbrand III, ruled jointly.
Henry VI		c.1270 First son of Henry IV and Sofia Daniilovna of Galicia-Volhynia	1287 – 11 November 1324	County of Blankenburg	Christina of Gleichen-Tonna; 1268 seven children Oda of Henneberg-Hartenberg c.1310/20? no children	11 November 1324 aged 53–54	Sons of Henry IV, divided their inheritance.
Günther VII		c.1270 Second son of Henry IV and Sofia Daniilovna of Galicia-Volhynia	1287-1326	County of Blankenburg (at Leutenberg)	Unknown no children Catharina Reuss of Gera two children Matilda (d.1373) no children	10 December 1352 aged 81–82?	Sons of Henry IV, divided their inheritance.
Leutenberg is annexed by the main branch of Schwarzburg
Günther VIII		c.1270? First son of Günther VI and Sophia of Lüchow	1289-1318/24	County of Käfernburg	Irmgard of Schwarzburg six children	1318/24 aged 48–54?	Sons of Günther VI. Gunther VIII and Otto divided the inheritance. Gunther IX and Gunther X ruled alongside their brother Gunther VIII. Having left no children of his own, Otto left his part of Arnstadt to the county of Blankenburg.
Günther IX		c.1270? Third son of Günther VI and Sophia of Lüchow	1289-1332/3	County of Käfernburg	Matilda of Regenstein between 5 June and 29 July 1312 four children	1332/3 aged 62–63?	Sons of Günther VI. Gunther VIII and Otto divided the inheritance. Gunther IX and Gunther X ruled alongside their brother Gunther VIII. Having left no children of his own, Otto left his part of Arnstadt to the county of Blankenburg.
Günther X		c.1270? Fourth son of Günther VI and Sophia of Lüchow	1289-1295	County of Käfernburg	Unmarried	1295 aged 24–25?	Sons of Günther VI. Gunther VIII and Otto divided the inheritance. Gunther IX and Gunther X ruled alongside their brother Gunther VIII. Having left no children of his own, Otto left his part of Arnstadt to the county of Blankenburg.
Otto		c.1270? Second son of Günther VI and Sophia of Lüchow	1289-1306	County of Arnstadt (half 1)	Unmarried	1306 aged 35–36?	Sons of Günther VI. Gunther VIII and Otto divided the inheritance. Gunther IX and Gunther X ruled alongside their brother Gunther VIII. Having left no children of his own, Otto left his part of Arnstadt to the county of Blankenburg.
Half 1 of Arnstadt annexed to Blankenburg
Günther VI		c.1250 First son of Günther V and Irmgard	1292/3 – 24 October 1308	County of Schwarzburg	Matilda of Käfernburg before 21 August 1301 eleven children	24 October 1308 aged 57–58?	Sons of Günther V, received jointly their inheritance. It's possible that they co-ruled with their father prior to his death, possibly since c.1270.
Henry V		c.1250 Second son of Günther V and Irmgard	1292/3-1293	County of Schwarzburg	Oda of Henneberg-Hartenberg two children	1293 aged 42–43?	Sons of Günther V, received jointly their inheritance. It's possible that they co-ruled with their father prior to his death, possibly since c.1270.
John I		c.1250 Third son of Günther V and Irmgard	1292/3-1303	County of Schwarzburg	Unmarried	1303 aged 52–53?	Sons of Günther V, received jointly their inheritance. It's possible that they co-ruled with their father prior to his death, possibly since c.1270.
Adelaide		c.1275? First daughter of Günther VII and Adelaide of Schwarzburg	10 June 1302 – 1305	County of Arnstadt (half 2.1)	Otto V, Count of Weimar-Orlamünde; 1296 one child	1305 aged 29–30	Daughters of Gunther VII, divided their inheritance. Possibly inherited their parts of Arnstadt jointly with their husbands.
Irmgard		1282; Second daughter of Günther VII and Adelaide of Schwarzburg	10 June 1302 – 1315	County of Arnstadt (half 2.2)	Henry II, Count of Hohnstein before 1302 five children	1315 aged 32–33	Daughters of Gunther VII, divided their inheritance. Possibly inherited their parts of Arnstadt jointly with their husbands.
Arnstadt half 2.1 annexed to the Hohnstein family; Arnstadt half 2.2 annexed to the County of Weimar-Orlamunde
Günther VIII		c.1290 First son of Günther VI and Matilda of Käfernburg	1308-1320	County of Schwarzburg	Unmarried	1320 aged 29–30?	After his childless death, his brothers divided the county.
Matilda		c.1270? Daughter of Frederick and Elisabeth of Neuenburg	1312-1338	County of Wiehe	Herman IV, Count of Weimar-Orlamünde; 1290 nine children	1338 aged 67–68?	After her death the county passed to the county of Weimar-Orlamünde.
In 1338 Wiehe was annexed to Weimar-Orlamünde
Henry VIII		c.1290 Second son of Günther VI and Matilda of Käfernburg	1320-1354/5	County of Leutenberg (with Schwarzburg half 1)	Helena of Holstein-Pinneberg ten children Helena of Nuremberg before 27 January 1346 one child	1354/5 aged 64–65	Brothers of Günther VIII, ruled jointly possibly until 1326, when they received Leutenberg from their kin Günther VII. A division of the inheritance is then made.
Günther X		c.1305? Third son of Günther VI and Matilda of Käfernburg	1320-1358	County of Wachsenburg (with Schwarzburg half 2)	Richeza of Schlüsselberg before 24 November 1326 six children	1358 aged 52–53	Brothers of Günther VIII, ruled jointly possibly until 1326, when they received Leutenberg from their kin Günther VII. A division of the inheritance is then made.
Henry VII		c.1290 Second son of Henry VI and Christina of Gleichen-Tonna	11 November 1324 – 1338	County of Blankenburg	Elisabeth of Weimar-Orlamünde before 5 June 1321 five children	1338 aged 47–48	Children of Henry VI, ruled jointly until 1326, when they divided their inheritance. It's possible that they had already co-ruled jointly with their father at least since 1320. Gunther IX was also elected in Frankfurt am Main as King of Germany by four Electors who opposed Charles of Luxembourg, who would be later elected as Charles IV, Holy Roman Emperor.
Günther IX		1303; Blankenburg; Third son of Henry VI and Christina of Gleichen-Tonna	11 November 1324 – 18 June 1349	County of Arnstadt	Elisabeth of Hohnstein before 9 September 1331 five children	18 June 1349; Frankfurt am Main aged 45–46	Children of Henry VI, ruled jointly until 1326, when they divided their inheritance. It's possible that they had already co-ruled jointly with their father at least since 1320. Gunther IX was also elected in Frankfurt am Main as King of Germany by four Electors who opposed Charles of Luxembourg, who would be later elected as Charles IV, Holy Roman Emperor.
Ludolf V		c.1290? First son of Gerhard I	1326-1358/61	County of Hallermund (half 2)	Unknown four children	1358/61 aged 68–71?	Children of Gerhard I, ruled jointly. Ludolf V was the only one of this branch who had descendants. Ludolf's children, (Henry II, Gerhard V and Ludolf VI) are only documented in 1366, but are not known as counts. If they did not succeed their father Ludolf V in the co-rulership, the two halves of Hallermund were reunited after Henry I's abdication in 1384.
Gerhard III		c.1290? Second son of Gerhard I	1326-c.1340	County of Hallermund (half 2)	Unmarried	c.1340? aged 49–50?	Children of Gerhard I, ruled jointly. Ludolf V was the only one of this branch who had descendants. Ludolf's children, (Henry II, Gerhard V and Ludolf VI) are only documented in 1366, but are not known as counts. If they did not succeed their father Ludolf V in the co-rulership, the two halves of Hallermund were reunited after Henry I's abdication in 1384.
Henry I		c.1315? First son of Gerhard I and Gerburg of Homburg	1326-c.1384	County of Hallermund (half 2)	Unmarried	c.1400 aged 84–85?	Children of Gerhard I, ruled jointly. Ludolf V was the only one of this branch who had descendants. Ludolf's children, (Henry II, Gerhard V and Ludolf VI) are only documented in 1366, but are not known as counts. If they did not succeed their father Ludolf V in the co-rulership, the two halves of Hallermund were reunited after Henry I's abdication in 1384.
Otto I		c.1315? Second son of Gerhard I and Gerburg of Homburg	1326-1361	County of Hallermund (half 2)	Unmarried	1361 aged 45–46	Children of Gerhard I, ruled jointly. Ludolf V was the only one of this branch who had descendants. Ludolf's children, (Henry II, Gerhard V and Ludolf VI) are only documented in 1366, but are not known as counts. If they did not succeed their father Ludolf V in the co-rulership, the two halves of Hallermund were reunited after Henry I's abdication in 1384.
Günther XI the Elder		c.1300? Son of Günther VIII and Irmgard of Schwarzburg	1332/3-1371	County of Käfernburg	Loretta of Eppstein before 9 November 1341 seven children Irmgard of Weimar-Orlamünde; 1364 no children	1371 aged 70–71?	Cousins, ruled jointly.
Günther XII the Younger		c.1300? Son of Günther IX and Matilda of Regenstein	1332/3-1341	County of Käfernburg	Agnes no children	1341 aged 40–41?	Cousins, ruled jointly.
Henry IX		1325; First son of Henry VII and Elisabeth of Weimar-Orlamünde	1338-1372/3	County of Blankenburg	Agnes of Hohnstein-Sondershausen; 24 February 1338 eight children	1372/3 aged 47–48	Sons of Henry VII, divided their inheritance.
Günther XI		9 September 1331; Second son of Henry VII and Elisabeth of Weimar-Orlamünde	1338 – 6 June 1368	County of Sondershausen	Elisabeth of Hohnstein-Sondershausen before 11 June 1347 three children	6 June 1368 aged 36	Sons of Henry VII, divided their inheritance.
Wilbrand V		c.1320? First son of Gerhard II and Elisabeth of Everstein-Polle	c.1340-1375	County of Hallermund (half 1 until 1384; both halves since 1384)	Unmarried	1377 aged 56–57?	Children of Gerhard II, ruled jointly. In 1384, the county of Hallermund was reunited. Wilbrand possibly abdicated to become Archdeacon at Elze.
Otto II		c.1320? Second son of Gerhard II and Elisabeth of Everstein-Polle	1345/6-1392	County of Hallermund (half 1 until 1384; both halves since 1384)	Adelaide of the Mark; 15 March 1332 three children	1392 aged 71–72?	Children of Gerhard II, ruled jointly. In 1384, the county of Hallermund was reunited. Wilbrand possibly abdicated to become Archdeacon at Elze.
Gerhard IV		c.1320? Third son of Gerhard II and Elisabeth of Everstein-Polle	c.1345-c.1380	County of Hallermund (half 1 until 1384; both halves since 1384)	Unmarried	c.1380 aged 59–60?	Children of Gerhard II, ruled jointly. In 1384, the county of Hallermund was reunited. Wilbrand possibly abdicated to become Archdeacon at Elze.
Regency of Elisabeth of Hohnstein (1349-1353)							After his death Arnstadt reverted to Blankenburg.
Henry X		1339; Son of Günther IX and Elisabeth of Hohnstein	18 June 1349 – November 1357	County of Arnstadt	Unmarried	November 1357 aged 17–18	After his death Arnstadt reverted to Blankenburg.
In 1357, Arnstadt rejoined Blankenburg
Günther XII		1322; First son of Henry VIII and Helena of Holstein-Pinneberg	1354/55 – 4 July 1382	County of Schwarzburg (half 1)	Magdalena Reuss of Plauen one child Gertrude of Anhalt-Bernburg before 12 August 1371 two children	4 July 1382 aged 59–60	Sons of Henry VIII, divided their inheritance
Henry XI		c.1340? Second son of Henry VIII and Helena of Nuremberg	1354/55-1402	County of Leutenberg	Anna Reuss of Plauen; 1373 one child	1402 aged 61–62?	Sons of Henry VIII, divided their inheritance
Günther XIII		c.1320? First son of Günther X and Richeza of Schlüsselberg	1358-1362	County of Wachsenburg	Adelaide of Hohenlohe-Uffenheim; 1357 two children	1362 aged 41–42?	Children of Günther X, Günther XIII and John II divided their inheritance. Some of John II's children did not survive him, but as they are counted as rulers, it is possible that they co-ruled with him in his part of the inheritance.
John II		1327; Second son of Günther X and Richeza of Schlüsselberg	1358-1407	County of Schwarzburg (half 2)	Richeza of Henneberg-Hartenberg; July 1358 seven children Sophia of Schwarzburg-Blankenburg no children	February/May 1407 aged 79–80	Children of Günther X, Günther XIII and John II divided their inheritance. Some of John II's children did not survive him, but as they are counted as rulers, it is possible that they co-ruled with him in his part of the inheritance.
Günther XVII		c.1340 First son of John II and Richeza of Henneberg-Hartenberg	1373-1395/6	County of Schwarzburg (half 2)	Judith of Schwarzburg-Blankenburg; 1375 four children	1395/6 aged 54–56	Children of Günther X, Günther XIII and John II divided their inheritance. Some of John II's children did not survive him, but as they are counted as rulers, it is possible that they co-ruled with him in his part of the inheritance.
Henry XV		c.1340 Second son of John II and Richeza of Henneberg-Hartenberg	1373-1395	County of Schwarzburg (half 2)	Unmarried	1395 aged 54–55	Children of Günther X, Günther XIII and John II divided their inheritance. Some of John II's children did not survive him, but as they are counted as rulers, it is possible that they co-ruled with him in his part of the inheritance.
Balthasar I		c.1340 Fourth son of John II and Richeza of Henneberg-Hartenberg	1373-1396	County of Schwarzburg (half 2)	Unmarried	1396 aged 55–56	Children of Günther X, Günther XIII and John II divided their inheritance. Some of John II's children did not survive him, but as they are counted as rulers, it is possible that they co-ruled with him in his part of the inheritance.
Günther XV		c.1340 Son of Günther XIII and Adelaide of Hohenlohe-Uffenheim	1362-1397	County of Wachsenburg	Unmarried	1397 aged 56–57?	As he died childless, he left Wachsenburg to his cousin Henry XVII, son of Gunther XVII.
George		c.1330? First son of Günther XI and Loretta of Eppstein	1371-1376	County of Käfernburg (at Ilmenau)	Sophia of Schwarzburg-Blankenburg; 1353 three children	1376 aged 45–46?	George and Günther XIII ruled jointly at first, and after George's death, his son Günther XIV replaced his role in the co-rulership.
Günther XIII		c.1330? Second son of Günther XI and Loretta of Eppstein	1371-1386	County of Käfernburg (at Hermannstein)	Unmarried	1386 aged 45–46?	George and Günther XIII ruled jointly at first, and after George's death, his son Günther XIV replaced his role in the co-rulership.
In 1386, Hermannstein was possibly annexed by the Margraviate of Meissen
Henry XII		1339; Second son of Henry IX and Agnes of Hohnstein-Sondershausen	1373	County of Blankenburg	Unmarried	1373 aged 33–34	Sons of Henry IX, divided their inheritance after possibly co-ruling with their father. They died without male descendants and were succeeded by their cousins from Sondershausen.
Henry XIII		c.1340 Third son of Henry IX and Agnes of Hohnstein-Sondershausen	1373-c.1390	County of Blankenburg	Unknown no children Agnes Reuss of Gera no children	c.1390 aged 49–50	Sons of Henry IX, divided their inheritance after possibly co-ruling with their father. They died without male descendants and were succeeded by their cousins from Sondershausen.
Günther XIV		c.1340? Fourth son of Henry IX and Agnes of Hohnstein-Sondershausen	1373 – 30 April 1418	County of Arnstadt	Helena of Schwarzburg-Leutenberg two children Margaret of Henneberg-Schleusingen; 23 January 1399 no children	30 April 1418; Lake Constance aged 77–78	Sons of Henry IX, divided their inheritance after possibly co-ruling with their father. They died without male descendants and were succeeded by their cousins from Sondershausen.
In 1418, Arnstadt was re-annexed to Blankenburg
Günther XIV the Younger		c.1355 Son of George and Sophia of Schwarzburg-Blankenburg	1376-1385	County of Käfernburg (at Ilmenau)	Matilda of Mansfeld; 21 August 1379 no children Agnes of Querfurt no children	1385; Mount Sinai aged 29–30	Died in pilgrimage to Jerusalem.
In 1385, Käfernburg was annexed by the Margraviate of Meissen
Günther XVIII		c.1340? Son of Günther XII and Magdalena Reuss of Plauen	4 July 1382 – 1397/9	County of Schwarzburg (half 1)	Anna of Falkenstein; 28 August 1390 two children	1397/9 aged 57–59?	Left no male descendants, and the county was re-annexed to Leutenberg.
Schwarzburg half 1 rejoined Leutenberg
Henry XIV		1350; First son of Günther XI and Elisabeth of Hohnstein-Sondershausen	6 June 1368 – c.1390	County of Sondershausen	Unmarried	1413 aged 62–63	Sons of Günther XI from Sondershausen, Henry XIV and Günther XVI inherited the rule of Blankenburg and integrated Sonderhausen in it. Later Günther XVI associated Henry XVIII to the co-rulership.
Henry XIV		1350; First son of Günther XI and Elisabeth of Hohnstein-Sondershausen	c.1390-1413	County of Blankenburg	Unmarried	1413 aged 62–63	Sons of Günther XI from Sondershausen, Henry XIV and Günther XVI inherited the rule of Blankenburg and integrated Sonderhausen in it. Later Günther XVI associated Henry XVIII to the co-rulership.
Günther XVI		1352; Second son of Günther XI and Elisabeth of Hohnstein-Sondershausen	6 June 1368 – c.1390	County of Sondershausen	Anna of Leuchtenberg (1354-24 January 1423) before 20 January 1375 three children	17 July 1416; Arnstadt aged 63–64	Sons of Günther XI from Sondershausen, Henry XIV and Günther XVI inherited the rule of Blankenburg and integrated Sonderhausen in it. Later Günther XVI associated Henry XVIII to the co-rulership.
Günther XVI		1352; Second son of Günther XI and Elisabeth of Hohnstein-Sondershausen	c.1390 – 17 July 1416	County of Blankenburg	Anna of Leuchtenberg (1354-24 January 1423) before 20 January 1375 three children	17 July 1416; Arnstadt aged 63–64	Sons of Günther XI from Sondershausen, Henry XIV and Günther XVI inherited the rule of Blankenburg and integrated Sonderhausen in it. Later Günther XVI associated Henry XVIII to the co-rulership.
Henry XVIII the Younger		c.1370 First son of Günther XVI and Anna of Leuchtenberg	c.1400 – 10 October 1410	County of Blankenburg	Elisabeth of Weimar-Orlamünde no children	10 October 1410 aged 39–40	Sons of Günther XI from Sondershausen, Henry XIV and Günther XVI inherited the rule of Blankenburg and integrated Sonderhausen in it. Later Günther XVI associated Henry XVIII to the co-rulership.
Sondershausen rejoined Blankenburg
Otto III		c.1350? Son of Otto II and Adelaide of the Mark	1392-1411	County of Hallermund	Elisabeth no children	1411/2 aged 61–62?	In 1411, endebted, sold the county to the Principality of Brunswick-Wolfenbüttel, and died not long after.
In 1411 Hallermund was sold to the Principality of Brunswick-Wolfenbüttel
Henry XVII		c.1380 First son of Günther XVII and Judith of Schwarzburg-Blankenburg	1397-1406	County of Wachsenburg	Margaret of Hohenlohe-Brauneck; 29 October 1398 no children	1406 aged 25-26	Son of Gunther XVII from Schwarzburg half 1, inherited Wachsenburg from his cousin Gunther XV.
In 1406 Wachsenburg was annexed to Blankenburg
Anna Reuss of Plauen		1354; Daughter of Henry VI, Lord of Reuss-Plauen and Luitgard of Kranichfeld	1402-1410	County of Leutenberg (at Remda)	Henry XI; 1373 one child	1410 aged 55–56	Ruled jointly. After Anna's death, Henry XVI (who may have been co-ruling with his father since at least the 1390s), inherited her feud at Remda. Albert I was a canon at Köln and then at Würzburg, and maybe had to abdicate before entering into clergy.
Henry XVI		1375; First son of Henry XI and Anna Reuss of Plauen	1402-1426	County of Leutenberg	Margaret one child Elisabeth of Weimar-Orlamünde one child	1426 aged 50–51	Ruled jointly. After Anna's death, Henry XVI (who may have been co-ruling with his father since at least the 1390s), inherited her feud at Remda. Albert I was a canon at Köln and then at Würzburg, and maybe had to abdicate before entering into clergy.
Albert I		c.1375? Second son of Henry XI and Anna Reuss of Plauen	1402-1411	County of Leutenberg	Unmarried	15 July 1421 aged 45–46?	Ruled jointly. After Anna's death, Henry XVI (who may have been co-ruling with his father since at least the 1390s), inherited her feud at Remda. Albert I was a canon at Köln and then at Würzburg, and maybe had to abdicate before entering into clergy.
Albert II		c.1375? Fourth son of Henry XI and Anna Reuss of Plauen	1402-1431	County of Leutenberg	Unmarried	1431 aged 55–56?	Ruled jointly. After Anna's death, Henry XVI (who may have been co-ruling with his father since at least the 1390s), inherited her feud at Remda. Albert I was a canon at Köln and then at Würzburg, and maybe had to abdicate before entering into clergy.
Günther XIX		c.1380 Second son of Günther XVII and Judith of Schwarzburg-Blankenburg	1407-1450	County of Schwarzburg (half 2)	Matilda of Henneberg-Schleusingen; 16 November 1407 three children Catharina of Schönburg-Glauchau; 18 February 1453 no children	1450 aged 69–70	Son of Gunther XVII, inherited his half of Schwarzburg directly from his grandfather John II, as his father and uncles predeceased him. After his death, most of his half of Schwarzburg was annexed to Blankenburg.
In 1450 Schwarzburg half 2 (with exceptions) was annexed to Blankenburg
Henry XIX	the Bellicose	1388; Blankenburg; Second son of Günther XVI and Anna of Leuchtenberg	17 July 1416 – 7 October 1444	County of Blankenburg	Catharina of Brunswick-Wolfenbüttel; 1413 three children	7 October 1444; Arnstadt aged 55–56	
Henry XX		1412; Son of Henry XVI and Elisabeth of Weimar-Orlamünde	1431-1462/4	County of Leutenberg	Brigitte Reuss of Gera; 1443 three children	1462/4; Leutenberg aged 49–52	
Henry XXI		23 October 1418; Son of Henry XIX and Catharina of Brunswick-Wolfenbüttel	7 October 1444 – 13 January 1488	County of Blankenburg	Elisabeth of Clèves; 15 July 1434 eleven children	13 January 1488 aged 69	Possibly abdicated from Arnstadt and Sondershausen for his eldest children.
Ursula		c.1410 Daughter of Günther XIX and Matilda of Henneberg-Schleusingen	1450-1461	County of Schwarzburg (half 2, at Ehrenstein)	Gebhard V, Count of Mansfeld; 1428 two children Louis, Count of Gleichen-Blankenhein; 1442 one child	1461 aged 50–51	Inherited Ehrenstein from her father. After her death, Ehrenstein was annexed to Mansfeld.
In 1461 Ehrenstein was annexed to the House of Mansfeld
Regency of Brigitte Reuss of Gera (1462/4-1473)							
Balthasar II		1453; Son of Henry XX and Brigitte Reuss of Gera	1462/4 – 18 June 1525	County of Leutenberg	Anna Sack; 1494 two children	18 June 1525 aged 71–72	
Günther XX the Elder	'	8 July 1439; First son of Henry XXI and Elisabeth of Clèves	1476 – 30 December 1503	County of Arnstadt	Margaret of Henneberg-Schleusingen; 22/29 October 1458; Arnstadt two children	30 December 1503; Rudolstadt aged 64	Elder sons of Henry XXI, possibly ruled in separate feuds created by their father. Gunther XX had no children, and his estate came into possession of his brother. Gunther XXI.
Günther XXI the Middle		1450; Rudolstadt; Second son of Henry XXI and Elisabeth of Clèves	1476 – 19 November 1484	County of Sondershausen	Catharina of Querfurt; 1470 four children	19 November 1484; Delmenhorst aged 33–34	Elder sons of Henry XXI, possibly ruled in separate feuds created by their father. Gunther XX had no children, and his estate came into possession of his brother. Gunther XXI.
In 1503 Arnstadt was briefly annexed to Sondershausen
Regency of Günther XX, Count of Arnstadt, (1484-1487)							
Henry XXII		November 1473; Son of Günther XXI and Catharina of Querfurt	19 November 1484 – 4 August 1526	County of Sondershausen	Magdalena of Hohnstein; 1449 four children Anna of Nassau-Idstein; 19 August 1506 one child	4 August 1526; Nordhausen aged 52	
Günther XXII	of Bremen	30 May 1455; Third son of Henry XXI and Elisabeth of Clèves	13 January 1488 – 8 August 1531	County of Blankenburg	Amalia of Mansfeld; 3 November 1493; Sondershausen three children	8 August 1531 aged 75–76	Younger son of Henry XXI, inherited his father's main possessions in Blankenburg.
John Henry, Count of Schwarzburg-Leutenberg		1496; Son of Balthasar II and Anna Sack	18 June 1525 – 14 March 1555	County of Leutenberg	Margaret Reuss of Weida; 13 January 1527 nine children	14 March 1555; Glauchau aged 58–59	
Günther XXIII the Rich		31 October 1499; Sondershausen; Son of Henry XXII and Magdalena of Hohnstein	4 August 1526 – 10 November 1552	County of Arnstadt	Elisabeth of Isenburg-Ronneburg; 29 November 1528; Sondershausen three children	10 November 1552; Gehren aged 53	Children of Henry XXII, divided their inheritance. In 1537 Gunther inherited his childless brother's possessions in Sondershausen, and in the next year his cousin's at Blankenburg.
Henry XXIV the Younger		7 August 1507; Sondershausen; Son of Henry XXII and Anna of Nassau-Idstein	4 August 1526 – 10 January 1537	County of Sondershausen	Margaret of Schönberg; 4/17 March 1531; Dresden no children	10 January 1537; Frankenhausen aged 29	Children of Henry XXII, divided their inheritance. In 1537 Gunther inherited his childless brother's possessions in Sondershausen, and in the next year his cousin's at Blankenburg.
In 1537 Sondershausen was annexed to Arnstadt
Henry XXIII The Reformer		23 March 1499; Son of Günther XXII and Amalia of Mansfeld	8 August 1531 – 12 July 1538	County of Blankenburg	Catharina of Henneberg-Schleusingen, the Heroic; 14 November 1524 six children	12 July 1538 aged 39	Son of Günther XXII. Left no male descendants, and his possessions were inherited by Arnstadt.
In 1538 Blankenburg was annexed to Arnstadt
Regency of Margaret Reuss of Weida (1555-1559)							His childless death allowed the Arnstadt branch to reunify the remnants of the old county of Schwarzburg.
Philip I		1540; Son of John Henry, Count of Schwarzburg-Leutenberg and Margaret Reuss of Weida	14 March 1555 – 8 October 1564	County of Leutenberg	Catharina of Brunswick-Grubenhagen; 4 December 1559; Saalfeld no children	8 October 1564; Leipzig aged 23–24	His childless death allowed the Arnstadt branch to reunify the remnants of the old county of Schwarzburg.
In 1564 Leutenberg was annexed to Arnstadt
Günther XXIV the Bellicose		25 September 1529; Sondershausen; First son of Günther XXIII and Elisabeth of Isenburg-Ronneburg	10 November 1552 – 1564	County of Arnstadt	Catherine of Nassau-Dillenburg; 17 November 1560; Arnstadt three children	23 May 1583; Antwerp aged 53	Children of Günther XXIII. Günther XXIV inherited alone his father's possessions centered at Arnstadt. In 1564 briefly reunited Schwarzburg, and seven years later redivided it between himself and his brothers. As Gunther himself left no descendants, his domains were absorbed by Sondershausen. The same happened to William, who inherited Frankenhausen and also left no children. Frankenhausen was absorbed by Rudolstadt
Günther XXIV the Bellicose		25 September 1529; Sondershausen; First son of Günther XXIII and Elisabeth of Isenburg-Ronneburg	8 October 1564 – 1571	County of Schwarzburg	Catherine of Nassau-Dillenburg; 17 November 1560; Arnstadt three children	23 May 1583; Antwerp aged 53	Children of Günther XXIII. Günther XXIV inherited alone his father's possessions centered at Arnstadt. In 1564 briefly reunited Schwarzburg, and seven years later redivided it between himself and his brothers. As Gunther himself left no descendants, his domains were absorbed by Sondershausen. The same happened to William, who inherited Frankenhausen and also left no children. Frankenhausen was absorbed by Rudolstadt
Günther XXIV the Bellicose		25 September 1529; Sondershausen; First son of Günther XXIII and Elisabeth of Isenburg-Ronneburg	1571 – 23 May 1583	County of Arnstadt	Catherine of Nassau-Dillenburg; 17 November 1560; Arnstadt three children	23 May 1583; Antwerp aged 53	Children of Günther XXIII. Günther XXIV inherited alone his father's possessions centered at Arnstadt. In 1564 briefly reunited Schwarzburg, and seven years later redivided it between himself and his brothers. As Gunther himself left no descendants, his domains were absorbed by Sondershausen. The same happened to William, who inherited Frankenhausen and also left no children. Frankenhausen was absorbed by Rudolstadt
Arnstadt was annexed to Sonderhausen							Children of Günther XXIII. Günther XXIV inherited alone his father's possessions centered at Arnstadt. In 1564 briefly reunited Schwarzburg, and seven years later redivided it between himself and his brothers. As Gunther himself left no descendants, his domains were absorbed by Sondershausen. The same happened to William, who inherited Frankenhausen and also left no children. Frankenhausen was absorbed by Rudolstadt
John Günther I		20 December 1532; Sondershausen; Second son of Günther XXIII and Elisabeth of Isenburg-Ronneburg	1571 – 28 October 1586	County of Sondershausen	Anna of Oldenburg; 16 February 1566; Sondershausen twelve children	28 October 1586; Arnstadt aged 53	Children of Günther XXIII. Günther XXIV inherited alone his father's possessions centered at Arnstadt. In 1564 briefly reunited Schwarzburg, and seven years later redivided it between himself and his brothers. As Gunther himself left no descendants, his domains were absorbed by Sondershausen. The same happened to William, who inherited Frankenhausen and also left no children. Frankenhausen was absorbed by Rudolstadt
William		4 October 1534; Sondershausen; Third son of Günther XXIII and Elisabeth of Isenburg-Ronneburg	1571 – 30 September 1598	County of Frankenhausen	Elisabeth of Schlick; 6 April 1567; Frankenhausen no children Clara of Brunswick-Lüneburg; 7 March 1593; Frankenhausen no children	30 September 1598; Straussberg aged 63	Children of Günther XXIII. Günther XXIV inherited alone his father's possessions centered at Arnstadt. In 1564 briefly reunited Schwarzburg, and seven years later redivided it between himself and his brothers. As Gunther himself left no descendants, his domains were absorbed by Sondershausen. The same happened to William, who inherited Frankenhausen and also left no children. Frankenhausen was absorbed by Rudolstadt
Frankenhausen was annexed to Rudolstadt							Children of Günther XXIII. Günther XXIV inherited alone his father's possessions centered at Arnstadt. In 1564 briefly reunited Schwarzburg, and seven years later redivided it between himself and his brothers. As Gunther himself left no descendants, his domains were absorbed by Sondershausen. The same happened to William, who inherited Frankenhausen and also left no children. Frankenhausen was absorbed by Rudolstadt
Albert III		16 January 1537; Sondershausen; Second son of Günther XXIII and Elisabeth of Isenburg-Ronneburg	1571 – 10 April 1605	County of Rudolstadt	Juliana of Nassau-Siegen; 14 June 1575; Rudolstadt ten children Albertine Elisabeth of Leiningen-Westerburg; 2 March 1591; Rudolstadt no children	10 April 1605; Rudolstadt aged 68	Children of Günther XXIII. Günther XXIV inherited alone his father's possessions centered at Arnstadt. In 1564 briefly reunited Schwarzburg, and seven years later redivided it between himself and his brothers. As Gunther himself left no descendants, his domains were absorbed by Sondershausen. The same happened to William, who inherited Frankenhausen and also left no children. Frankenhausen was absorbed by Rudolstadt
Günther XXV		7 September 1570; Sondershausen; First son of John Günther I and Anna of Oldenburg	28 October 1586 – 7 January 1643	County of Sondershausen	Unmarried	7 January 1643; Sondershausen aged 72	Sons of John Günther I, ruled jointly.
Anton Henry		7 October 1571; Sondershausen; Second son of John Günther I and Anna of Oldenburg	28 October 1586 – 10 August 1638	County of Sondershausen	Unmarried	10 August 1638; Sondershausen aged 66	Sons of John Günther I, ruled jointly.
John Günther II		3 May 1577; Sondershausen; Third son of John Günther I and Anna of Oldenburg	28 October 1586 – 16 December 1631	County of Sondershausen	Unmarried	16 December 1631; Sondershausen aged 54	Sons of John Günther I, ruled jointly.
Christian Günther I		11 May 1578; Sondershausen; Fourth son of John Günther I and Anna of Oldenburg	28 October 1586 – 25 November 1642	County of Sondershausen	Anna Sibylle of Schwarzburg-Rudolstadt; 15 November 1612; Sondershausen nine children	25 November 1642; Arnstadt aged 64	Sons of John Günther I, ruled jointly.
Charles Günther the Multiplier		6 November 1576; Rudolstadt; First son of Albert III and Juliana of Nassau-Siegen	10 April 1605 – 24 September 1630	County of Rudolstadt	Anna Sophie of Anhalt; 13 June 1611; Rudolstadt no children	24 September 1630; Kranichfeld aged 53	Sons of Albert III, ruled jointly.
Louis Günther I the Strong		27 June 1581; Rudolstadt; Second son of Albert III and Juliana of Nassau-Siegen	10 April 1605 – 4 November 1646	County of Rudolstadt	Emilie of Oldenburg-Delmenhorst; 4 February 1638; Rudolstadt five children	4 November 1646; Rudolstadt aged 65	Sons of Albert III, ruled jointly.
Albert Günther		8 August 1582; Rudolstadt; Third son of Albert III and Juliana of Nassau-Siegen	10 April 1605 – 20 January 1634	County of Rudolstadt	Unmarried	20 January 1634; Erfurt aged 52	Sons of Albert III, ruled jointly.
Christian Günther II the Pious		1 April 1616; Ebeleben; Second son of Christian Günther I and Anna Sibylle of Schwarzburg-Rudolstadt	7 January 1643 – 10 September 1666	County of Arnstadt	Sophia Dorothea of Mörsperg-Beffort; 1645; Arnstadt six children	10 September 1666; Arnstadt aged 50	Children of Christian Günther I, divided their inheritance.Ebeleben returned to Sondershausen after Louis Gunther's death.
Anton Günther I		9 January 1620; Ebeleben; Third son of Christian Günther I and Anna Sibylle of Schwarzburg-Rudolstadt	7 January 1643 – 19 August 1666	County of Sondershausen	Maria Magdalene of Palatinate-Birkenfeld; 29 October 1644; Sondershausen ten children	19 August 1666; Ebeleben aged 46	Children of Christian Günther I, divided their inheritance.Ebeleben returned to Sondershausen after Louis Gunther's death.
Louis Günther II		2 March 1621; Ebeleben; Fourth son of Christian Günther I and Anna Sibylle of Schwarzburg-Rudolstadt	7 January 1643 – 20 July 1681	County of Sondershausen (at Ebeleben)	Concordia of Sayn-Wittgenstein; 30 March 1669; Ebeleben two children	20 July 1681; Arnstadt aged 60	Children of Christian Günther I, divided their inheritance.Ebeleben returned to Sondershausen after Louis Gunther's death.
In 1681 Ebeleben was annexed again to Sondershausen
Regency of Emilie of Oldenburg-Delmenhorst (1646-1662)							He was elevated twice to an Imperial Prince, but only accepted the second proposal, at the end of his reign (1710). The County evolved into a Principality.
Albert Anton		14 November 1641; Rudolstadt; Son of Louis Günther I and Emilie of Oldenburg-Delmenhorst	4 November 1646 – 15 December 1710	County of Rudolstadt (until 1710) Principality of Rudolstadt (from 1710)	Emilie Juliane of Barby-Mühlingen; 7 July 1665; Rudolstadt two children	15 December 1710; Rudolstadt aged 69	He was elevated twice to an Imperial Prince, but only accepted the second proposal, at the end of his reign (1710). The County evolved into a Principality.
Regency of Sophia Dorothea of Mörsperg-Beffort (1666-1668)							Died without descendants. The county passed to his cousin, Anton Günther II.
John Günther III		30 June 1654; Son of Christian Günther II and Sophia Dorothea of Mörsperg-Beffort	10 September 1666 – 29 August 1669	County of Arnstadt	Unmarried	29 August 1669 aged 15	Died without descendants. The county passed to his cousin, Anton Günther II.
Christian William		6 January 1647; Sondershausen; First son of Anton Günther I and Maria Magdalene of Palatinate-Birkenfeld	19 August 1666 – 10 May 1721	County of Sondershausen (until 1697) Principality of Sondershausen (from 1697)	Antonia Sybilla of Barby-Mühlingen; 22 August 1673; Sondershausen seven children Wilhelmine Christiane of Saxe-Weimar; 1684; Sondershausen eight children	10 May 1721; Sondershausen aged 74	Inherited Sondershausen from his father, in 1681 Eberleben from his uncle Louis Günther II, and in 1716, Arnstadt from his brother. In 1697 he was raised to Imperial Prince.
Anton Günther II		10 October 1653; Sondershausen; Second son of Anton Günther I and Maria Magdalene of Palatinate-Birkenfeld	29 August 1669 – 20 December 1716	County of Arnstadt (until 1697) Principality of Arnstadt (from 1697)	Augusta Dorothea of Brunswick-Wolfenbüttel; 7 August 1684; Wolfenbüttel no children	20 December 1716; Arnstadt aged 63	Inherited Arnstadt from his cousin. In 1697 he was raised to Imperial Prince. However, left no descendants. The Principality returned to Sondershausen
In 1716 Arnstadt was annexed again to Sondershausen
Louis Frederick I		25 October 1667; Rudolstadt; Son of Albert Anton and Emilie Juliane of Barby-Mühlingen	15 December 1710 – 24 June 1718	Principality of Rudolstadt	Anna Sophie of Saxe-Gotha-Altenburg; 15 October 1691; Gotha thirteen children	24 June 1718; Rudolstadt aged 50	
Frederick Anton		14 October 1692; Rudolstadt; First son of Louis Frederick I and Anna Sophie of Saxe-Gotha-Altenburg	24 June 1718 – 1 September 1744	Principality of Rudolstadt	Sophia Wilhelmina of Saxe-Coburg-Saalfeld; 8 February 1720; Saalfeld three children Sophia Christina of East Frisia; 6 January 1729; Rudolstadt no children	1 September 1744; Rudolstadt aged 51	
Günther XXVI		13 August 1678; Auleben; Third son of Christian William and Antonia Sybilla of Barby-Mühlingen	10 May 1721 – 28 November 1740	Principality of Sondershausen	Elisabeth Albertine of Anhalt-Bernburg; 2 October 1712; Sondershausen no children	28 November 1740; Sondershausen aged 62	Left no descendants. The Principality passed to his half-brother, Henry.
Henry XXV the Diamond Prince		8 November 1689; Sondershausen; First son of Christian William and Wilhelmine Christiane of Saxe-Weimar	28 November 1740 – 6 November 1758	Principality of Sondershausen	Unmarried	6 November 1758; Frankfurt am Main aged 68	Left no descendants. The Principality passed to his nephew, Christian Günther III, son of his brother August.
John Frederick		8 January 1721; Rudolstadt; Son of Frederick Anton and Sophia Wilhelmina of Saxe-Coburg-Saalfeld	1 September 1744 – 10 July 1767	Principality of Rudolstadt	Bernardina Christina Sophia of Saxe-Weimar-Eisenach; 19 November 1744; Eisenach six children	10 July 1767; Rudolstadt aged 46	Left no male descendants. The principality passed to his uncle.
Christian Günther III		24 June 1736; Ebeleben; Son of Augustus of Schwarzburg-Sondershausen and Charlotte Sophie of Anhalt-Bernburg	6 November 1758 – 14 October 1794	Principality of Sondershausen	Charlotte Wilhelmine of Anhalt-Bernburg; 4 February 1760; Sondershausen six children	14 October 1794; Sondershausen aged 58	Nephew of Günther XXVI and Henry XXV.
Louis Günther II		22 October 1708; Rudolstadt; Fourth son of Louis Frederick I and Anna Sophie of Saxe-Gotha-Altenburg	10 July 1767 – 29 August 1790	Principality of Rudolstadt	Sophie Henrietta Reuss of Greiz; 22 October 1733; Greiz four children	29 August 1790; Rudolstadt aged 81	Succeeded his nephew.
Frederick Charles		7 June 1736; Rudolstadt; Son of Louis Günther II and Sophie Henrietta Reuss of Greiz	29 August 1790 – 13 April 1793	Principality of Rudolstadt	Frederica Sophie Auguste of Schwarzburg-Rudolstadt; 21 October 1763; Rudolstadt six children Auguste Louise Frederica of Saxe-Gotha-Altenburg; 28 November 1780; Rudolstadt no children	13 April 1793; Rudolstadt aged 56	
Louis Frederick II		9 August 1767; Rudolstadt; Son of Frederick Charles and Frederica Sophie Auguste of Schwarzburg-Rudolstadt	13 April 1793 – 28 April 1807	Principality of Rudolstadt	Caroline of Hesse-Homburg; 21 June 1791; Homburg seven children	28 April 1807; Rudolstadt aged 39	
Günther Frederick Charles I		5 December 1760; Sondershausen; Son of Christian Günther III and Charlotte Wilhelmine of Anhalt-Bernburg	14 October 1794 – 19 August 1835	Principality of Sondershausen	Caroline of Schwarzburg-Rudolstadt; 23 June 1799; Sondershausen two children	22 April 1837; Sondershausen aged 76	Abdicated.
Regency of Caroline of Hesse-Homburg (1807-1814)							He left no surviving legitimate children. The principality passed to his brother Albert.
Frederick Günther		6 November 1793; Rudolstadt; First son of Louis Frederick II and Caroline of Hesse-Homburg	28 April 1807 – 28 June 1867	Principality of Rudolstadt	Auguste of Anhalt-Dessau; 15 April 1816; Dessau three children Helene of Reina (morganatic); 7 August 1855; Dresden two children Maria Schultze (morganatic); 24 September 1861; Rudolstadt no children	28 June 1867; Rudolstadt aged 73	He left no surviving legitimate children. The principality passed to his brother Albert.
Günther Frederick Charles II		24 September 1801; Sondershausen; Son of Günther Frederick Charles I and Caroline of Schwarzburg-Rudolstadt	19 August 1835 – 17 July 1880	Principality of Sondershausen	Irene Maria of Schwarzburg-Rudolstadt; 12 March 1827; Sondershausen four children Matilda of Hohenlohe-Öhringen; 29 May 1835; Öhringen two children	15 September 1889; Sondershausen aged 87	Abdicated due to an eye condition.
Albert IV		30 April 1798; Rudolstadt; Second son of Louis Frederick II and Caroline of Hesse-Homburg	28 June 1867 – 26 November 1869	Principality of Rudolstadt	Augusta Louise of Solms-Braunfels; 26 July 1827; Rudolstadt four children	26 November 1869; Rudolstadt aged 71	
George Albert		23 November 1838; Rudolstadt; Son of Albert IV and Augusta Louise of Solms-Braunfels	28 November 1869 – 19 January 1890	Principality of Rudolstadt	Unmarried	19 January 1890; Rudolstadt aged 51	Left no descendants. He was succeeded by his cousin, George Victor.
Charles Günther		7 August 1830; Arnstadt; Son of Günther Frederick Charles II and Irene Maria of Schwarzburg-Rudolstadt	17 July 1880 – 28 March 1909	Principality of Sondershausen	Marie Gasparine of Saxe-Altenburg; 12 June 1869; Altenburg no children	28 March 1909; Dresden aged 78	Left no descendants. After his death Sondershausen was annexed to Rudolstadt.
In 1909 Sondershausen was annexed to Rudolstadt
Günther Victor		21 August 1852; Rudolstadt; Son of Adolph of Schwarzburg-Rudolstadt and Princess Mathilde of Schönburg-Waldenburg	19 January 1890 – 28 March 1909	Principality of Rudolstadt	Anna Louise of Schönburg-Waldenburg; 9 December 1891; Rudolstadt no children	16 April 1925; Sondershausen aged 72	Great-grandson of Frederick Charles. In 1909 reunited the principalities of Rudolstadt and Sonderhausen. In 1918, following the German revolution, abdicated and became Titular Prince.
Günther Victor		21 August 1852; Rudolstadt; Son of Adolph of Schwarzburg-Rudolstadt and Princess Mathilde of Schönburg-Waldenburg	28 March 1909 – 22 November 1918	Principality of Schwarzburg	Anna Louise of Schönburg-Waldenburg; 9 December 1891; Rudolstadt no children	16 April 1925; Sondershausen aged 72	Great-grandson of Frederick Charles. In 1909 reunited the principalities of Rudolstadt and Sonderhausen. In 1918, following the German revolution, abdicated and became Titular Prince.

== See also ==
- Schwarzburg-Rudolstadt
- Schwarzburg-Sondershausen
- List of consorts of Schwarzburg
