= Anton Günther I of Schwarzburg-Sondershausen =

Anton Günther I, Count of Schwarzburg-Sondershausen
- Born: 9 January 1620
- Died: 19 August 1666 (aged 46)
- Noble family: House of Schwarzburg
- Spouse: Countess Palatine Mary Magdalene of Zweibrücken-Birkenfeld
- Father: Christian Günther I, Count of Schwarzburg-Sondershausen
- Mother: Anna Sibille of Schwarzburg-Rudolstadt

Count Anton Günther I of Schwarzburg-Sondershausen (9 January 1620 – 19 August 1666) was the ruling Count of Schwarzburg-Sondershausen from 1642 until his death in 1666.

== Life ==
Count Anton Günther I was the son of the Count Christian Günther I of Schwarzburg-Sondershausen (1578-1642) and his wife Countess Anna Sibille (1584-1623), daughter of Count Albert VII of Schwarzburg-Rudolstadt.

After his father's death, he and his brothers Louis Günther II and Christian Günther II divided Schwarzburg-Sondershausen. Anton Günther I received most of Lower Schwarzburg-Sondershausen, except for a few districts that went to Louis Günther II.

He did much for the churches and schools and laid the foundation stone of the church in Sondershausen that replaced the one that had burned down in 1621. In 1657, the parish and school buildings burned down; he rebuilt those as well.

== Marriage and issue ==
Anton Günther I married Countess Palatine Mary Magdalene of Zweibrücken-Birkenfeld (1622-1689), a daughter of Count Palatine George William of Zweibrücken-Birkenfeld on 29 October 1644. They had the following children:

- Anna Dorothea (1645-1716), married Henry IV of Reuss-Greiz (1650-1686)
- Christian William I (1647-1721), Count and from 1697 the Prince of Schwarzburg-Sondershausen
- Clara Juliana (1648-1739)
- Sophie Eleanor (1650-1718), Deaness at Quedlinburg
- Anton Günther II (1653-1716), Count and from 1697 the Prince of Schwarzburg-Sondershausen-Arnstadt
- Mary Magdalene (1655-1727)
- George Frederick or Rudolf (1657)
- George Ernest (1658-1659)
- Louis Günther III (1660)
- Johanne Elisabeth (1662-1720)
