= Christian Günther (disambiguation) =

Christian Günther (1886–1966) was a Swedish diplomat and politician.

Christian Günther may also refer to:

- Christian Günther I, Count of Schwarzburg-Sondershausen (1578–1642)
- Christian Günther II, Count of Schwarzburg-Sondershausen-Arnstadt (1616–1666)
- Christian Günther III, Prince of Schwarzburg-Sondershausen (1736–1794)
- Christian Günther von Bernstorff (1769–1835), Danish and Prussian statesman and diplomat
