= Günther VII of Schwarzburg-Blankenburg =

Günther VII, Count of Schwarzburg-Blankenburg
- Died: 1274
- Noble family: House of Schwarzburg
- Spouse: Sophie
- Father: Henry II, Count of Schwarzburg-Blankenburg
- Mother: Irmgard of Weimar-Orlamünde

Count Günther VII of Schwarzburg (died 1274) was Count of Schwarzburg-Blankenburg from 1236 until his death.

== Life ==
Günther was a son of Count Henry II of Schwarzburg-Blankenburg from his marriage with Countess Irmgard of Weimar-Orlamünde (died: c. 1222).

Around 1228/29 Günther is in Jerusalem, together with Emperor Frederick II.

In 1236, he succeeded his father as Count of Schwarzburg-Blankenburg.

During the War of the Thuringian Succession, he was taken prisoner in 1248/1249.

In 1259, he succeeded his brother Henry III as Count of Schwarzburg.

In 1267, he founded the monastery at Saalfeld.

== Marriage and issue ==
Günther was married with a lady named Sophie, about whom nothing further is known. They had the following children:

- Günther IΧ (died 1289), Count of Schwarzburg-Blankenburg
  - Albert IV knight of St. John (Hospitalier)
- Sophie (died 1279), married 1268 with Count Berthold V of Henneberg
- Irmgard (died 1313), abbess of Ilm
- Henry V (died 1285), Count of Schwarzburg-Blankenburg
  - Henry VII, Count of Schwarzburg-Blankenburg
- Günther X (died c. 1308
- Albert III (died c. 1265
- Günther XI (died c. 1308
- A daughter, who married Count Otto of Lobdeburg-Arnshaugk
- Christina, married c. 1282 to Burgrave Otto of Dohna
