= Charles Gunther =

Charles Gunther may refer to:

- Charles F. Gunther (1837–1920), German-American candymaker and collector of historical artifacts
- Charles Godfrey Gunther (1822–1885), mayor of New York, 1864–1866
- Charles Günther, Count of Schwarzburg-Rudolstadt (1576–1630), German nobleman
