= Louis Günther II of Schwarzburg-Ebeleben =

Louis Günther II, Count of Schwarzburg-Ebeleben
- Born: 2 March 1621
- Died: 20 July 1681 (aged 60)
- Noble family: House of Schwarzburg
- Spouse: Concordia of Sayn-Wittgenstein
- Father: Christian Günther I, Count of Schwarzburg-Sondershausen
- Mother: Anna Sibylle of Schwarzburg-Rudolstadt

Louis Günther II, Count of Schwarzburg-Ebeleben (2 March 1621 – 20 July 1681) was the ruling count of Schwarzburg-Ebeleben from 1642 until his death. From 1666 until his death, he was also regent of Schwarzburg-Arnstadt on behalf of his underage nephews.

From 1642 to 1666, he ruled Schwarzburg-Ebeleben, from 1666 until his death, he ruled Schwarzburg-Arnstadt.

== Life ==
He was a son of Count Christian Günther I of Schwarzburg-Sondershausen (1578-1642) and his wife Anna Sibylle (1584-1623), a daughter of Count Albrecht VII of Schwarzburg-Rudolstadt.

After his father's death, he and his brothers divided the county. Louis Günther II received the districts Ebeleben, Schernberg, Keula, and the towns of Greußen, Clingen, Großenehrich and Rohnstedt in the Clingen district. He resided in Ebeleben from 1642 until 1666. In 1666, he became guardian and regent for the sons of his brother Anton Günther II, and moved to Arnstadt.

After the death of his nephew John Günther IV, Louis Günther II and his nephews Christian William I and Anton Günther II inherited Upper Schwarzburg-Sondershausen, which they ruled jointly.

Louis Günther II died in 1681, without male issue. With his death, the Schwarzburg-Ebeleben line died out, and his territory fell to his nephews.

== Marriage and issue ==
On 30 March 1669, Louis Günther II married Concordia (1648-1683), a daughter of Count John of Sayn-Wittgenstein. They had two daughters:

- Anna Auguste (1671-1688)
- Concordie (1672-1687)
