= Albert VII =

Albert VII may refer to:

- Albert VII of Austria (1559–1621)
- Albrecht VII of Mecklenburg (1488–1547)
- Albrecht VII of Schwarzburg-Rudolstadt (1537–1605)
