= Juliane of Nassau =

Juliane or Juliana of Nassau may mean:

- Juliane of Nassau-Dillenburg (1546-1588), sister of William I of Orange-Nassau
- Juliane of Nassau-Dillenburg (1565-1630), daughter of Johann VI, Count of Nassau-Dillenburg
- Juliane of Nassau-Siegen (1587–1643), by marriage landgravine of Hesse-Kassel
- Juliana of the Netherlands (1909-2004), Queen of the Netherlands (1948-1980)

== See also ==
- Louise Juliana of Nassau (1576-1644), daughter of William I of Orange-Nassau, Princess Palatine by marriage
- Marie Juliane of Nassau-Siegen (1612-1665), daughter of John VII, Count of Nassau-Siegen
