= Thüringenhausen =

- Ortsteil of Ebeleben
- Interactive map of Thüringenhausen
- Location within Germany Location within Thuringia
- Coordinates: 51°16′N 10°48′E
- Country: Germany
- State: Thuringia
- District: Kyffhäuserkreis
- Town: Ebeleben

Area
  - Total: 3.8 km^{2} (1.5 sq mi)
- Elevation: 220 m (720 ft)

Population (2018-12-31)
  - Total: 108
  - Density: 28/km^{2} (74/sq mi)
- Time zone: UTC+01:00 (CET)
  - Summer (DST): UTC+02:00 (CEST)
- Postal codes: 99713
- Dialling codes: 036370
- Vehicle registration: KYF

Thüringenhausen (German pronunciation: [tyːʁɪŋənˈhaʊzn̩]) is a village and a former municipality in the district Kyffhäuserkreis, in Thuringia, Germany. Since December 2019, it is part of the town Ebeleben.
