= Bad Blankenburg =

- Town
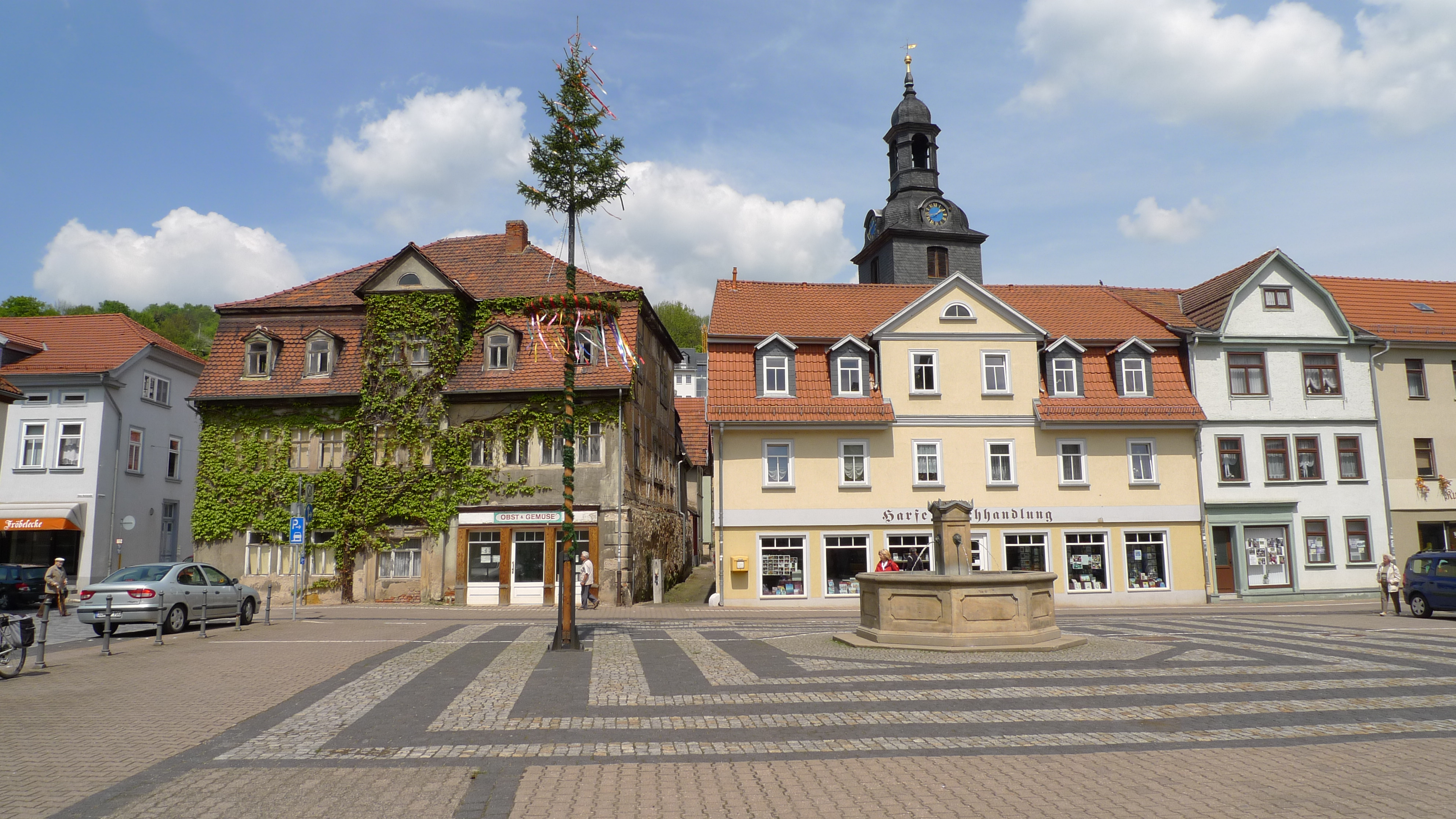

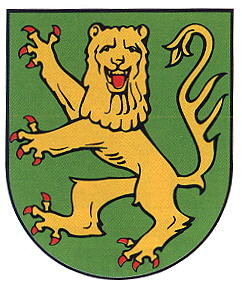
- Coat of arms

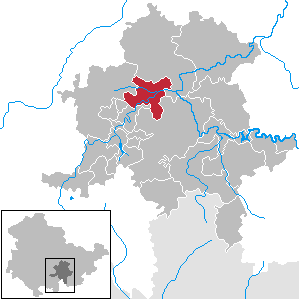
- Location of Bad Blankenburg within Saalfeld-Rudolstadt district
- Interactive map of Bad Blankenburg
- Location within Germany Location within Thuringia
- Coordinates: 50°41′N 11°16′E
- Country: Germany
- State: Thuringia
- District: Saalfeld-Rudolstadt
- Subdivisions: 8

Government
  - Mayor (2024–30): Thomas Schubert (CDU)

Area
  - Total: 35.62 km^{2} (13.75 sq mi)
- Elevation: 220 m (720 ft)

Population (2025-12-31)
  - Total: 5,843
  - Density: 164.0/km^{2} (424.9/sq mi)
- Time zone: UTC+01:00 (CET)
  - Summer (DST): UTC+02:00 (CEST)
- Postal codes: 07422
- Dialling codes: 036741
- Vehicle registration: SLF
- Website: www.bad-blankenburg.de

Bad Blankenburg (German pronunciation: [bat ˈblaŋkn̩bʊʁk]) is a spa town in the district of Saalfeld-Rudolstadt, in Thuringia, Germany. It is situated 6 km southwest of Rudolstadt, and 37 km southeast of Erfurt. It is most famous for being the location of the first kindergarten of Friedrich Wilhelm August Fröbel, in 1837.

To the north of it, on an eminence, rise the fine ruins of the castle of Greifenstein, built by the German king Henry I, and from 1275 to 1583 the seat of a cadet branch of the counts of Schwarzburg.

In the nineteenth century, Bad Blankenburg was part of the small principality of Schwarzburg-Rudolstadt.

Bad Blankenburg is the headquarters of Deutsche Evangelische Allianz, a cooperative network of most Protestant churches in Germany.

== Historical Population ==
Historical Population (from 1960 as of 31 December):

- 1834: 1,256
- 1933: 4,557
- 1939: 5,307
- 1960: 10,126
- 1994: 8,323
- 1995: 8,197
- 1996: 8,136
- 1997: 8,076
- 1998: 8,037
- 1999: 7,963
- 2000: 7,909
- 2001: 7,764
- 2002: 7,688
- 2003: 7,658
- 2004: 7,613
- 2005: 7,498
- 2006: 7,363
- 2007: 7,281
- 2008: 7,235
- 2009: 7,173
- 2010: 7,047
- 2011: 6,873
- 2012: 6,816
- 2013: 6,724
- 2014: 6,644

Data source from 1994: Thuringian Office for Statistics

== Twin towns – sister cities ==
Tarnów Opolski, Poland
