= Günther von Schwarzburg (opera) =

Opera by Ignaz Holzbauer

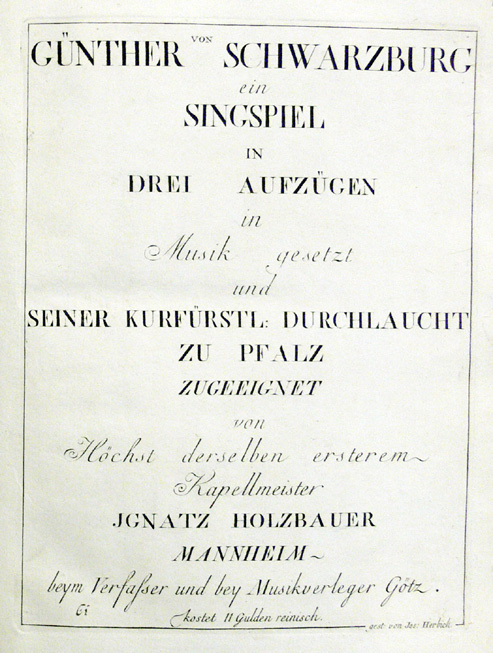
First page of the Günther von Schwarzburg score published by Johann Michael Götz in 1777

Günther von Schwarzburg is a Singspiel in three acts by Ignaz Holzbauer set to a German libretto by Anton Klein. Loosely based on events in the life of the 14th-century German king, Günther von Schwarzburg, the opera premiered on 5 January 1777 at the Hoftheater in the Mannheim Palace.

== Background ==
Holzbauer's librettist, Anton Klein — a former Jesuit who taught philosophy and literature at Mannheim University — was a strong advocate for the use of German and set about writing a libretto comparable to those written for Italian opera seria. The writing was also influenced by contemporary Sturm und Drang literature. However, the colourful music was praised unanimously whereas the drama divided its critics into those who exalted it and its strongly patriotic message, and those who thought that it lacked literary quality. Mozart attended a performance on 5 November 1777 and in a letter to his father on 14 November 1777, he praised the music but scorned the libretto:

Holzbauer′s music is very beautiful, but the poetry is not worthy of such music. What surprises me the most is, that so old a man as Holzbauer [66 years] should still have so much spirit, for the opera is incredibly full of fire.

Günther von Schwarzburg was the first full German opera score to come off a printing press. The beautifully engraved edition was published by the Mannheim firm of Johann Michael Götz with a dedication to Karl Theodor: ″the most illustrious patron of music under whose august protection the Palatinate Theatre has first praised a German hero.″

== Performance history ==
The first performance took place at the Hoftheater in Mannheim on 5 January 1777 in a lavish production with sets designed by Lorenzo Quaglio. The performance also included a ballet choreographed by Étienne Lauchery to music by Christian Cannabich. The cast included two of the most famous singers of the day, Anton Raaff as Günther von Schwarzburg and Francesca Lebrun (née Franziska Danzi) as Anna, a role which Holzbauer had composed specifically for her voice. The opera was successfully revived in Mannheim in 1785. Modern revivals of the opera include a radio broadcast (RAI) in 1960, sung in Italian, with Luigi Infantino and Anna Moffo, conducted by Oliviero De Fabritiis, and the 1994 concert performance in Frankfurt conducted by Michael Schneider with Christoph Prégardien in the title role and the 1997 concert performance in Amsterdam conducted by Ton Koopman with John Aler in the title role.

== Roles ==
Role	Voice type	Premiere, 5 January 1777 (Conductor: )
Karl, King of Bohemia	tenor	Franz Hartig
Günther von Schwarzburg	tenor	Anton Raaff
Rudolf II, Count Palatine	bass	Ludwig Fischer
Anna, daughter of Rudolf	soprano	Franziska Danzi
Asberta, Dowager Queen, Karl′s mother	soprano	Barbara Strasser

== Synopsis ==
Günther von Schwarzburg (1304–1349)

Set in 1349, the opera is loosely based on the 1347–1349 succession crisis in Germany. The plot centers on the conflict between Karl, King of Bohemia and Count Günther von Schwarzburg to succeed Ludwig the Bavarian as Holy Roman Emperor. Günther is supported by the powerful Elector, Rudolf II. However, Asberta indulges in intrigue on behalf of her son Karl by manipulating Anna, Rudolf′s daughter. In the end, both Günther and his antagonist Asberta die. Günther is poisoned by Asberta, and she commits suicide. Karl secures his throne and marries Anna. Günther′s last words are:

German

GÜNTHER
Ich sterbe! Karl!
Herrsch über freie Völker!
O Deutschland, Deutschland!
Wie klein bist du zerteilt durch Zwietracht!
Wie groß durch Brüdereinheit!
Karl! Rudolf! Meine Brüder!
Entnervender als Zwietracht
Ist Hang zu fremder Sitte
Stolz deutsch zu sein ist eure Größe!

DAS VOLK
Der Held des Vaterlandes stirbt!

English

GÜNTHER
I die! Karl!
Rule over free nations!
O Germany, Germany!
How small are you divided up by civil strife!
How great with brotherly unity!
Karl! Rudolf! My brothers!
More enervating than civil strife
Is a love of foreign customs
Pride in being German is your greatness!

ALL MEN
The hero of the Fatherland dies!

== Recording ==
- Ignaz Holzbauer: Günther von Schwarzburg (Christoph Prégardien (tenor), Claron McFadden (soprano), Clarry Bartha (soprano), Michael Schopper (bass), Robert Worle (tenor), La Stagione Orchestra and Chorus, conducted by Michael Schneider). Live performance, Frankfurt 1994. Capriccio CPO 999265.

== Notes and references ==
Notes

References

- Abert, Hermann (2007), W. A. Mozart (translated from the original German by Stewart Spencer, ed. Cliff Eisen), Yale University Press ISBN 978-0-300-07223-5
- Casaglia, Gherardo (2005)."Günther von Schwartzburg, 5 January 1777". L'Almanacco di Gherardo Casaglia (in Italian).
- Corneilson, Paul (1992), ″Günther von Schwarzburg″ in The New Grove Dictionary of Opera, ed. Stanley Sadie (London) ISBN 0-333-73432-7
- Goldbach, Karl Traugott (2004) ″Dying Scenes in the German Opera of the late 18th Century″, abstract of a paper given at the 3rd Global Conference of Making Sense of Dying and Death (Vienna, December 2−4, 2004)
- Höft, Brigitte (1992), ″Lebrun″ in The New Grove Dictionary of Music and Musicians, ed. Stanley Sadie (London)
- Mozart, Wolfgang Amadeus (1866). The letters of Wolfgang Amadeus Mozart, Vol. 1 (English translation by Lady Grace Wallace). New York: Hurd and Houghton
