= Anton Henry, Count of Schwarzburg-Sondershausen =

- Born: 7 October 1571; Sondershausen
- Died: 10 August 1638 (aged 66); Sondershausen
- Noble family: House of Schwarzburg
- Father: John Günther I, Count of Schwarzburg-Sondershausen
- Mother: Anna of Oldenburg-Delmenhorst

Anton Henry, Count of Schwarzburg-Sondershausen (7 October 1571 in Sondershausen – 10 August 1638, Sondershausen) was a German nobleman. He was the ruling Count of Schwarzburg-Sondershausen from 1594 until his death.

== Life ==
He was the son of Count John Günther I of Schwarzburg-Sondershausen (1532–1586), and his wife, Countess Anna (1539–1579), a daughter of Count Anthony I of Olenburg-Delmenhorst.

He was still a minor, when his father died, an so were his brothers, and they were put under the regency and guardianship of their maternal uncles John VII (1540–1603) and Anthony II (1550–1619). Later, the brothers ruled jointly. During this period, Anton Henry did most of the work, especially during the inheritance dispute with the Counts of Honstein.

The county suffered badly during the Thirty Years' War. The worst his area was around Arnstadt, where many troops were quartered. The counts did their best to mitigate the damage.

Anton Henry died in 1638. He was unmarried and had no legitimate issue. However, he did have children from a non-marital relationship.
