= Anton Günther II of Schwarzburg-Sondershausen-Arnstadt =

German nobleman and ruler (1653–1716)

Anton Günther II, Count of Schwarzburg-Sondershausen-Arnstadt
- Born: 10 October 1653; Sondershausen
- Died: 20 July 1716 (aged 62); Arnstadt
- Noble family: House of Schwarzburg
- Spouse: Augusta Dorothea of Brunswick-Wolfenbüttel
- Father: Anton Günther I, Count of Schwarzburg-Sondershausen
- Mother: Countess Palatine Mary Magdalene of Birkenfeld

Anton Günther II, Count of Schwarzburg-Sondershausen-Arnstadt (10 October 1653 in Sondershausen – 20 July 1716 in Arnstadt) was a Count of Schwarzburg and Hohenstein and Lord of Sondershausen, Arnstadt and Leutenberg from 1666 until his death. In 1697, he was raised to Prince of Schwarzburg.

== Life ==
Anton Günther II was a son of Count Anton Günther I and his wife Countess Palatine Mary Magdalene of Birkenfeld. In 1666 he succeeded his father, jointly with his older brother Christian William I. In 1681, the brothers divided their inheritance, with Anton Günther II receiving the districts Ebeleben, Schernberg, Keula, and Arnstadt and thus founding a short-lived cadet line. In 1697, the brothers were raised to Imperial Princes, but Anton Günther II refrained from using this title until 1709.

Anton Günther II extensively renovated his residence in Arnstadt. He was a major patron of music and an avid collector of antiques and objets d'art. During his rule, Arnstadt became an important cultural center. In 1702, he invited Johann Sebastian Bach, who was 17 years old at the time, to become court organist in Arnstadt.

In 1684, he married Augusta Dorothea (1666-1751), the daughter of Duke Anthony Ulrich of Brunswick-Wolfenbüttel. Their marriage remained childless and after his death, Arnstadt fell back to his brother Christian William.

== See also ==
- House of Schwarzburg
- Schwarzburg-Sondershausen
