= Günther von Schwarzburg =

German king (c. 1304–1349)

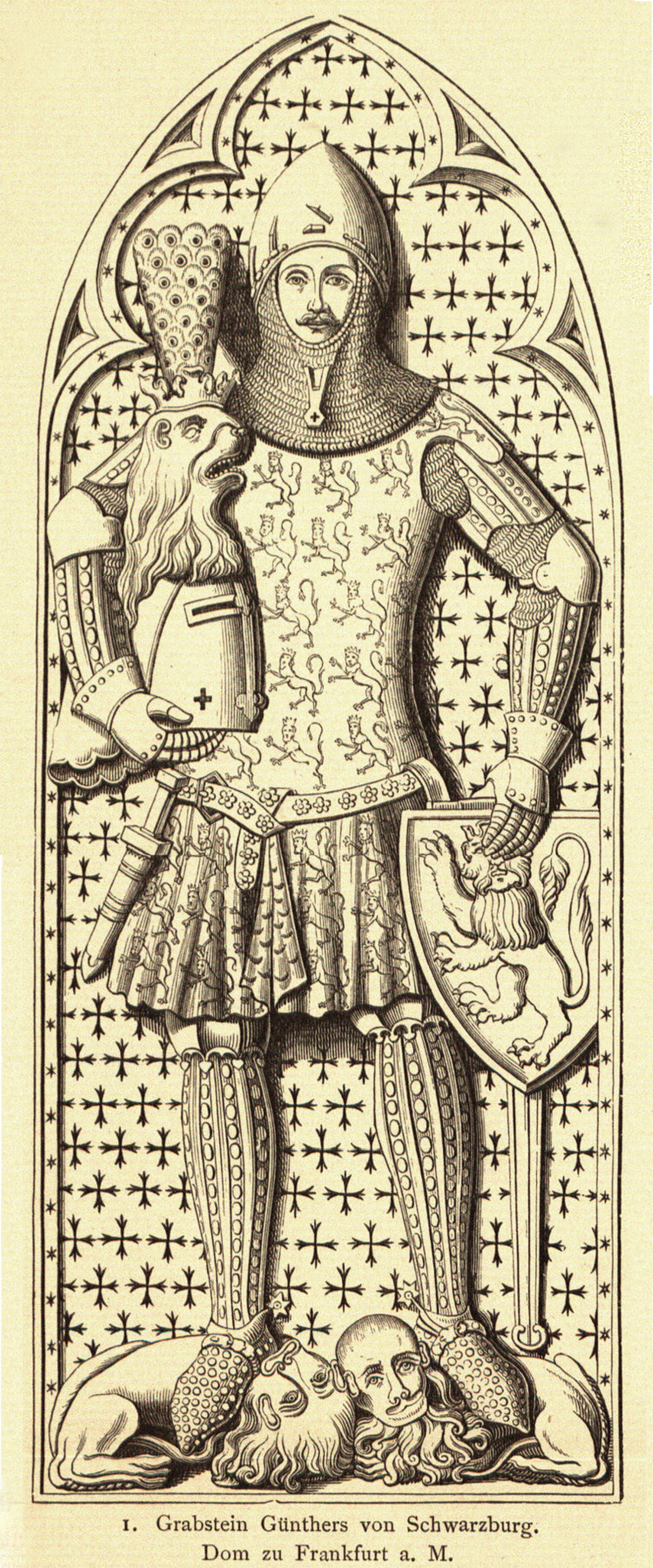
Günther von Schwarzburg in splinted armour on his tombstone in Frankfurt

Günther XXI von Schwarzburg (c. 1304 – 14 June 1349), disputed King of Germany, was a descendant of the counts of Schwarzburg.

== Biography ==
Born as the younger son of Henry VII, Count of Schwarzburg-Blankenburg (c. 1267–1324) and his wife, Christine von Gleichen (c. 1268). He married Elisabeth von Honstein-Klettenberg (c. 1302–1380), daughter of Count Heinrich IV, on 9 September 1331. They had five children: Sophia von Schwarzburg-Blankenburg (c. 1331 – aft. 1351); Agnes von Schwarzburg-Blankenburg (1330–1399); Elisabeth von Schwarzburg-Blankenburg (c. 1336–1380); Heinrich XIII de Schwarzburg-Bankenburg (c. 1338–1357), his childless heir; and Mechtild von Schwarzburg-Blankenburg (c. 1340–1370).

Günther distinguished himself as a diplomat in the service of Emperor Louis IV on whose death in 1347 he was offered the throne after it had been refused by Edward III of England. He was elected king at the Dominican monastery in Frankfurt on 30 January 1349 by the following four electors, who were partisans of the house of Wittelsbach and opponents of Charles (Karl) of Luxembourg, later the Emperor Charles IV:

1. Louis, Margrave of Brandenburg
2. The Duke of Saxe-Lauenburg
3. The Elector Palatine
4. The deposed Elector of Mainz, Heinrich III von Virneberg.

Günther justified his legitimacy by the fact that – unlike Charles who was elected in Rhens – he had been chosen "at the right place," Frankfurt. Günther argued also that Charles had not been crowned in the right place (not in Aachen, but in Bonn). Indeed, the city had recognized Charles IV's legitimacy after Ludwig's death and made Günther wait a week in the field before entering the city. It was not until 6 February that Günther moved into the city, where he was introduced to his office in the old tradition, confirmed the privileges of the city, and in return received homage from its citizens.

Charles, however, won over many of Günther's adherents and defeated Günther's army at the battle of Eltville on the Rhine River. Günther, who had become seriously ill, renounced all claims to the throne for the sum of 20,000 marks of silver on 26 May 1349 in the Treaty of Eltville, which also included amnesty for his followers.

Günther died three weeks later at the Johanniter monastery in Frankfurt, presumably from the Black Death. Günther himself suggested that he had been poisoned; however, this cannot be proven historically.

At the instigation of Charles IV, Günther was buried in the Frankfurt Cathedral with royal honors. His headstone, a masterpiece of gothic art, was erected in 1352. The Schwarzburgstraße and the Schwarzburgschule, as well as Güntherstraße in Frankfurt are named after him.

== Opera ==
Günther von Schwarzburg is also the subject of a Singspiel in three acts by Ignaz Holzbauer, first performed in 1777.
