= Günther XL of Schwarzburg =

Count of Schwarzburg

Günther XL, Count of Schwarzburg
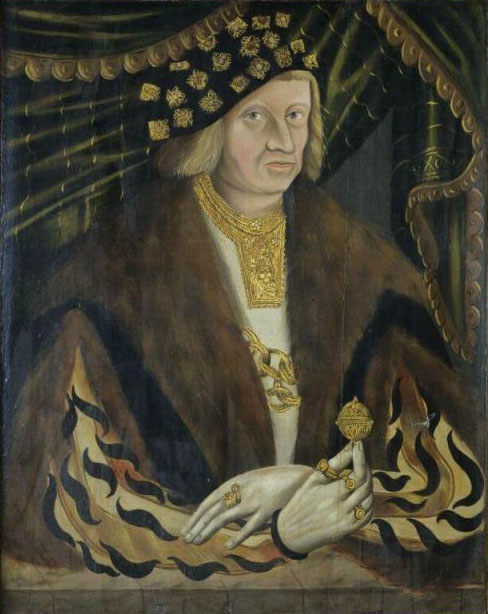
- Count Günther XL
- Born: 31 October 1499; Sondershausen
- Died: 10 November 1552 (aged 53); Gehren
- Noble family: House of Schwarzburg
- Spouse: Elisabeth of Isenburg-Büdingen-Ronneburg
- Father: Henry XXXI, Count of Schwarzburg-Blankenburg
- Mother: Magdalena of Hohnstein

Günther XL, Count of Schwarzburg nicknamed the Rich or Günther with the fat mouth (31 October 1499 in Sondershausen – 10 November 1552 in Gehren), was a ruling Count of Schwarzburg.

== Life ==
Guenther was the eldest son of Henry XXXI, Count of Schwarzburg-Blankenburg (1473–1526) and his first wife Magdalena of Hohnstein (1480–1504). His paternal grandparents were Guenther XXI. (XXXVIII.) von Schwarzburg-Blankenburg (1450–1484) and Katharina von Querfurt (1452–1521). Over time, Günther united all but one of the Schwarzburg possessions in one hand. He introduced Protestantism in his country and fought on the Protestant side against the emperor in the Schmalkaldic War. Günther benefitted considerably from the political downfall of the Ernestine branch of the House of Wettin.

In feudal matters, he came into conflict with Elector Johann Frederick I, Elector of Saxony. The Elector invaded Schwarzburg and torched the city of Sondershausen. Günther had to flee, and was only able to return after the battle of Mühlberg in 1547.

To demonstrate his accumulated wealth and power, he largely demolished the existing castle in Sondershausen in 1533 and built a new Renaissance château on the site. This château forms the old North, East and South wings of the current Sondershausen Palace.

After his death, the County of Schwarzburg was divided among his four sons. Thus, he became the ancestor of the two lines of the House of Schwarzburg that survived until the 20th century: Schwarzburg-Sondershausen and Schwarzburg-Rudolstadt.

== Marriage and issue ==
On 29 November 1528, Günther XL married Elisabeth (d. 14 May 1572), the daughter of Count Philip of Isenburg-Büdingen-Ronneburg. They had the following children:

- Günther XLI, Count of Schwarzburg-Arnstadt (1529–1583), nicknamed "the Bellicose", Count of Schwarzburg-Arnstadt
- Magdalena (1530–1565), married in 1552, to Count John Albert VI of Mansfeld-Arnstein
- Amalie (1531–1542)
- John Günther I, Count of Schwarzburg-Sondershausen (1532–1586), Count of Schwarzburg-Sondershausen
- William I, Count of Schwarzburg-Frankenhausen (1534–1597), Count of Schwarzburg-Frankenhausen
- Philip (1536-1536)
- Albert VII, Count of Schwarzburg-Rudolstadt (1537–1605), Count of Schwarzburg-Rudolstadt
- Otto Henry? (1538–1539) or Ottilie?
- Sybilla Anna (1540–1578), married in 1571 to Count Louis III of Isenburg-Birstein-Büdingen
- Elisabeth (1541–1612), married in 1576 to John VII, Count of Oldenburg
