= Juliane of Nassau-Dillenburg (1546–1588) =

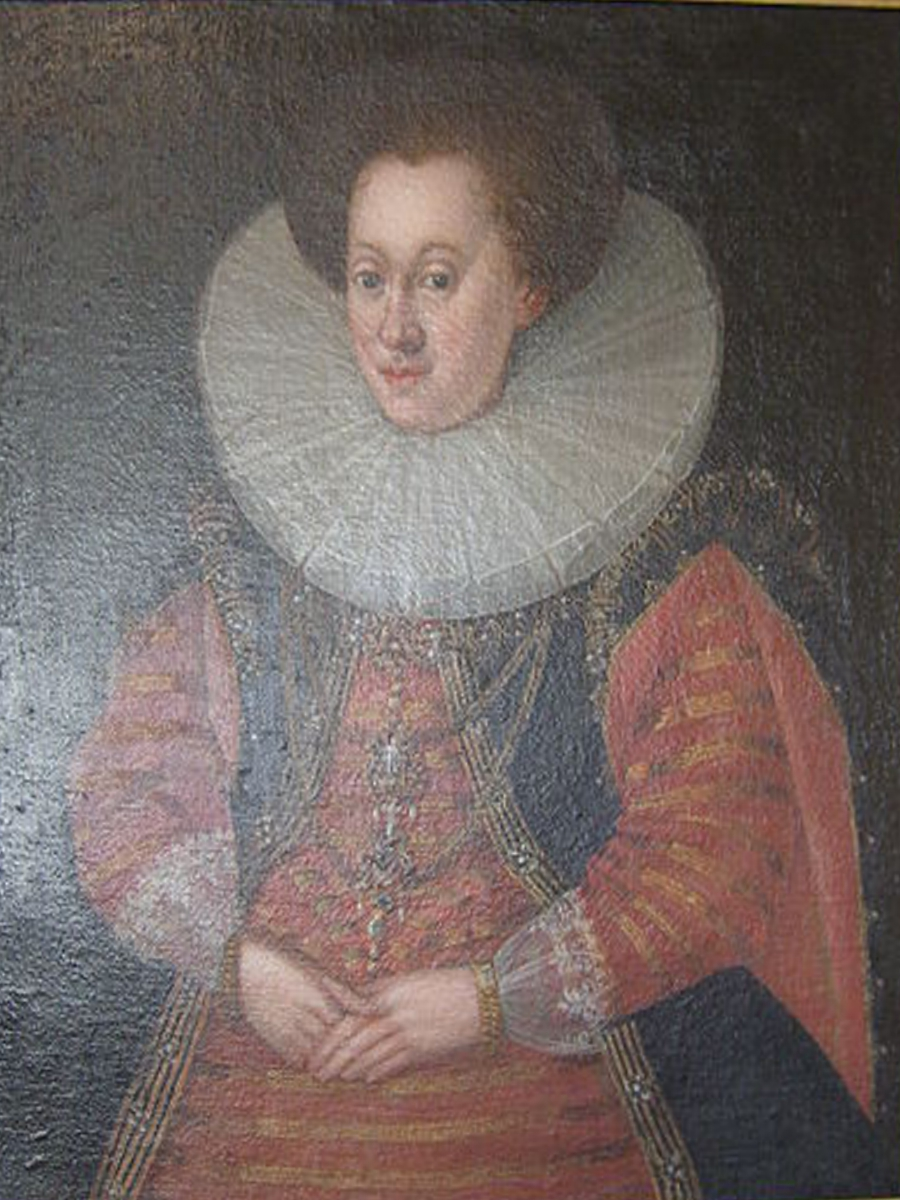
- Portrait of Juliane von Schwarzburg-Rudolstadt
- Born: 10 August 1546; Dillenburg
- Died: 31 August 1588 (aged 42)
- Noble family: House of Nassau
- Spouse: Albrecht VII of Schwarzburg-Rudolstadt
- Father: William I, Count of Nassau-Siegen
- Mother: Juliana of Stolberg

Juliane of Nassau-Dillenburg (10 August 1546 – 31 August 1588) was a younger sister of prince William I of Orange-Nassau.

Juliane was born at Dillenburg, the twelfth child of count William the Rich and Juliana of Stolberg, his second wife. Prior to her marriage, she had been engaged with Frederick II of Denmark. On 14 June 1575 she married Albrecht VII of Schwarzburg-Rudolstadt, with whom she had the following children:

- Charles Günther I (6 November 1576 – 24 September 1630)
- Elizabeth Juliane (1 January 1578 – 28 March 1658)
- Sophie (1 March 1579 – 24 August 1630), married on 30 March 1595 with Count Jobst II of Barby-Mühlingen
- Magdalene (12 April 1580 – 22 April 1632), married on 22 May 1597 with Count Henry II Reuss of Gera
- Louis Günther I (27 May 1581 – 4 November 1646)
- Albert Günther (8 August 1582 – 20 January 1634)
- Anna Sybilla (14 March 1584 – 22 August 1623), married on 15 November 1612 with Count Christian Günther I of Schwarzburg-Sondershausen
- Catharina Maria (13 July 1585 – 19 January 1659)
- Dorothea Susanne (13 February 1587 – 19 April 1662)
- Henry Günther (1588-1589)

Juliane of Nassau-Dillenburg died during the childbirth of her 10th child.

== Ancestry ==
Ancestors of Juliane of Nassau-Dillenburg (1546–1588)

8. John IV, Count of Nassau-Siegen
4. John V, Count of Nassau-Siegen
9. Mary of Looz-Heinsberg
2. William I, Count of Nassau-Siegen
10. Henry III, Landgrave of Hesse
5. Elisabeth of Hesse-Marburg
11. Anna von Katzenelnbogen
1. Juliane of Nassau-Dillenburg
12. Heinrich IX of Stolberg
6. Bodo III, Count of Stolberg-Wernigerode
13. Mathilde von Mansfeld
3. Juliana of Stolberg-Wernigerode
14. Philip I of Eppstein
7. Anna of Eppstein-Königstein
15. Louise de La Marck
