= Catherine of Nassau-Dillenburg =

- Born: 29 December 1543; Dillenburg Castle in Dillenburg
- Died: 25 December 1624 (aged 80); Arnstadt
- Noble family: House of Nassau
- Spouse: Günther XLI, Count of Schwarzburg-Arnstadt
- Father: William I, Count of Nassau-Siegen
- Mother: Juliana of Stolberg

Catherine of Nassau-Dillenburg (29 December 1543 at Dillenburg Castle in Dillenburg – 25 December 1624 in Arnstadt) was a daughter of William I, Count of Nassau-Siegen and his second wife, Juliana of Stolberg. She was a sister of William the Silent.

== Life ==
Catherine was raised at Dillenburg. In 1560, she married Günther XLI, Count of Schwarzburg-Arnstadt and she moved with her husband to Arnstadt. The marriage was childless, but she reportedly had a good relationship with her husband. They were also on good terms with her brother William. In 1574, they traveled to Breda to mediate between him and the Habsburg government. This attempt was not successful.

Catherine and her husband lived with William in Antwerp, where she continued to live after Günther died. She was present in Delft when her brother was assassinated by Balthasar Gérard. She then took Catharina Belgica, a daughter of William and Charlotte of Bourbon, with her to Arnstadt.

In 1593, she tried to settle a dispute between Maria of Nassau and Maurice, Prince of Orange over the legacy of their father William. She was not successful, but did succeed in mediating between Louise de Coligny and John VI, Count of Nassau-Dillenburg, who had disagreed over the future marriages of William's six daughters by Charlotte of Bourbon.

As a widow, Catherine collected books and gave to charity. She died in Arnstadt in 1624.
