= Leutenberg =

- Town
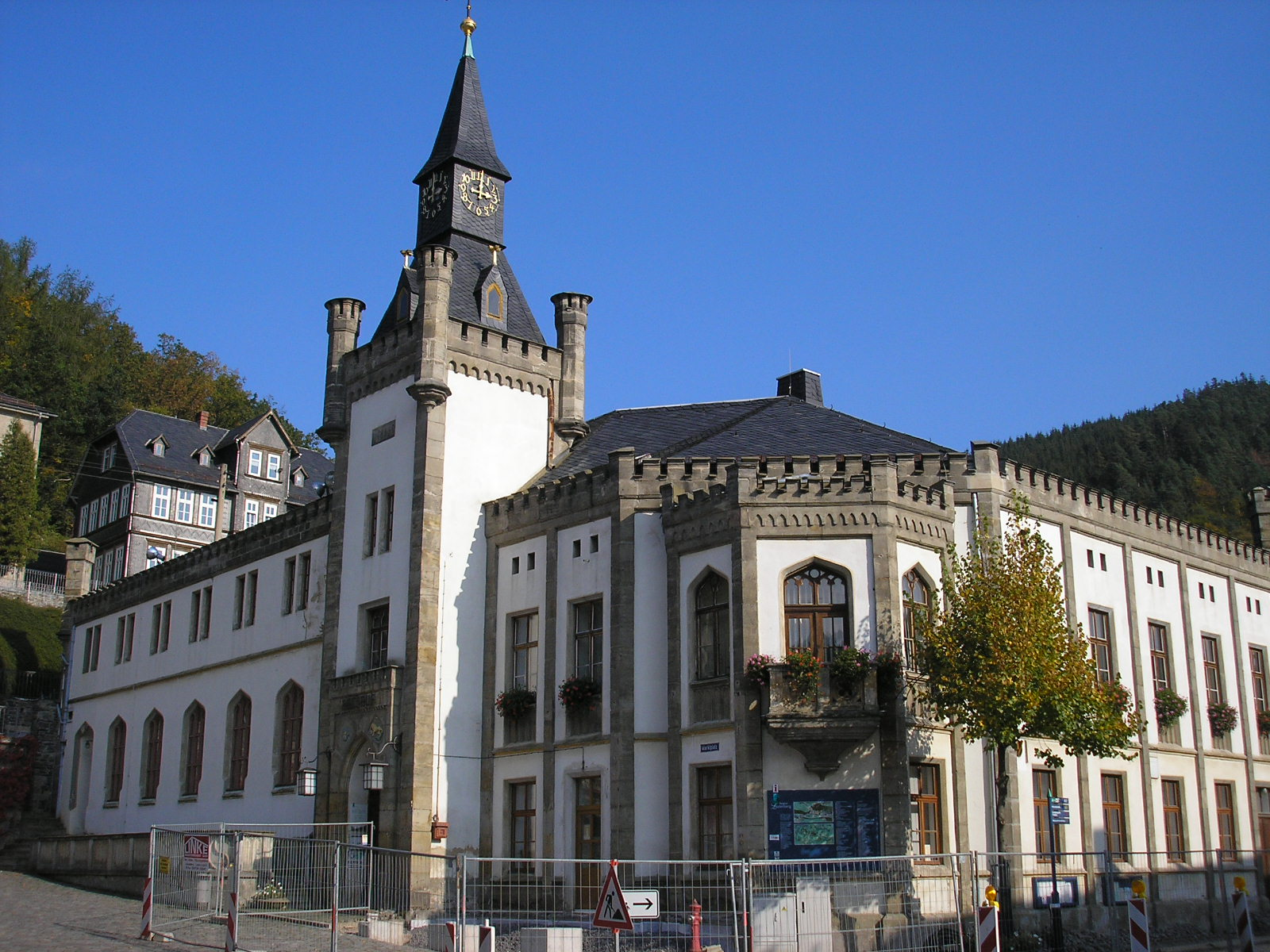
- Town hall

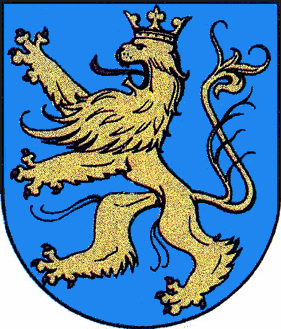
- Coat of arms

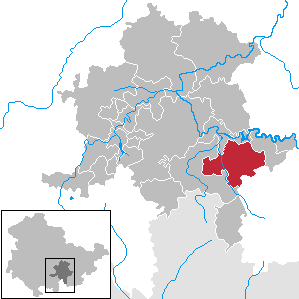
- Location of Leutenberg within Saalfeld-Rudolstadt district
- Interactive map of Leutenberg
- Location within Germany Location within Thuringia
- Coordinates: 50°33′N 11°27′E
- Country: Germany
- State: Thuringia
- District: Saalfeld-Rudolstadt
- Subdivisions: 12

Government
  - Mayor (2021–27): Robert Geheeb

Area
  - Total: 57.52 km^{2} (22.21 sq mi)
- Elevation: 300 m (980 ft)

Population (2025-12-31)
  - Total: 1,919
  - Density: 33.36/km^{2} (86.41/sq mi)
- Time zone: UTC+01:00 (CET)
  - Summer (DST): UTC+02:00 (CEST)
- Postal codes: 07338
- Dialling codes: 036734
- Vehicle registration: SLF
- Website: www.leutenberg.de

Leutenberg (German pronunciation: [ˈlɔʏtn̩bɛʁk]) is a town in the district of Saalfeld-Rudolstadt, in Thuringia, Germany. It is situated in the Thuringian Forest, 18 km (11 mi) southeast of Saalfeld.

== History ==
Within the German Empire (1871–1918), Leutenberg was part of the Principality of Schwarzburg-Rudolstadt.
