= Henry VII of Schwarzburg-Blankenburg =

Henry VII, Count of Schwarzburg-Blankenburg
- Born: before 1285
- Died: 11 November 1324
- Buried: Grey Monastery in Berlin
- Noble family: House of Schwarzburg
- Spouses: Christina of Gleichen; Utha of Henneberg-Hartenberg
- Father: Henry V of Schwarzburg-Blankenburg
- Mother: Sophie of Halych

Henry VII, Count of Schwarzburg-Blankenburg, also known as Henry VI (before 1285 – 11 November 1324) was the ruling Count of Schwarzburg-Blankenburg from 1285 until his death.

== Life ==
He was the son of Count Henry V of Schwarzburg-Blankenburg, from his marriage to Sophie of Halych, the daughter of King Daniel of Galicia. He was the uncle and guardian of Margrave Frederick the Serious.

In 1290, he became Lord of Blankenburg. In 1306, he became Lord of Wachsenburg and Stadtilm and half of Arnstadt. In 1323, he also became Lord of Saalfeld.

He died on 11 November 1324 during an expedition in the Margraviate of Brandenburg and was buried in the Grey Monastery in Berlin.

== Marriages and issue ==
His first wife was Christina of Gleichen (d. after 18 September 1296), a daughter of Count Albert III of Gleichen-Tonna (1249-1290) and Cecilia Esbernsdatter. They had seven children:

- Günther XX, (d. 28 September 1314)
- Henry X, (d. before 4 March 1338), married Elisabeth of Weimar-Orlamünde (d. 1362)
- Günther XXI (1303/1304 – 14/18 June 1349), married before 9 September 1331 to Elisabeth of Honstein (d. c. 4 April 1380)
- Jutta (d. after 1316), a nun in Ilm
- Judith (1306 – 11 September 1352), married Albert V, count of Barby-Mühlingen (1332 – 16 April or 16 August 1271)
- Irmgard (d. 26 March 1354), married before 26 July 1313 to Count Henry III of Orlamünde (d. after 26 March 1354)
- Henry (d. after 1325)

His second wife was married Utha (or Oda) of Henneberg-Hartenberg, documented in 1331, (d. 1 April 1346; buried in Arnstadt), widow of Henry V, Count of Schwarzburg (d. before 19 September 1293), daughter of Count Poppo X of Henneberg-Hartenberg (1286-1349) and Richza of Hohenlohe-Weikersheim (1305-1337). This marriage remained childless.
