= William I of Schwarzburg-Frankenhausen =

Count of Schwarzburg-Frankenhausen

William I, Count of Schwarzburg-Frankenhausen
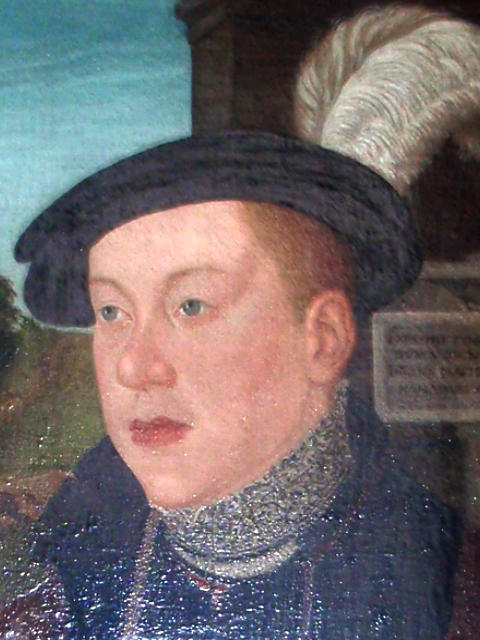
- William I, Count of Schwarzburg-Frankenhausen
- Born: 4 October 1534; Sondershausen
- Died: 30 September 1597 (aged 62); Straußberg, now part of Sondershausen
- Noble family: House of Schwarzburg
- Father: Günther XL, Count of Schwarzburg
- Mother: Elisabeth of Isenburg-Büdingen-Ronneburg

William I, Count of Schwarzburg-Frankenhausen (4 October 1534 in Sondershausen – 30 September 1597 in Straußberg, which is today part of Sondershausen), was the ruling Count of Schwarzburg-Frankenhausen from 1571 until his death. He was the founder of the Schwarzburg-Frankenhausen line.

== Life ==
He was the son of Count Günther XL of Schwarzburg (1490–1552), nicknamed the Rich or Günther with the fat mouth, and his wife, Countess Elisabeth (d. 14 May 1572), a daughter of Count Philip of Isenburg-Büdingen-Ronneburg. He was raised as a Christian and became a pious, God-fearing, strictly Lutheran man.

After the death of Günther XL in 1552, his four sons initially ruled the land jointly. Before he took up government, he studied for several years, in Erfurt, Jena, Leuven, and Padua. From 1563 to 1565, he served in the Danish army; in 1566 he fought against the Turks.

In 1571 the brothers decided to divide their county. William's part of the county included the city of Frankenhausen, which he chose as his residence, and the districts of Straußberg, Heringen and Kelbra. He later received the district of Schernberg as well. His part of the count was named Schwarzburg-Frankenhausen, after his residence.

After William I and his elder brother Günther XLI both died childless, the two remaining brothers, John Günther I and Albrecht VII divided their possessions. John Günther I received Arnstadt and Sondershausen and founded the Schwarzburg-Sondershausen line. Albrecht VII (1537–1605) received Rudolstadt and Frankenhausen and founded the Schwarzburg-Rudolstadt line.

William I signed both the Formula of Concord of 1577 and the Book of Concord of 1580.

== Marriages and issue ==
William's first marriage was on 6 April 1567 with Elisabeth (d. 23 November 1590), the daughter of Count Joachim of Schlick. His second marriage was on 7 March 1593 with Clara (1571–1658), the daughter of Duke William the Younger of Brunswick-Lüneburg. Both marriages remained childless.

== See also ==
- House of Schwarzburg
