= Anna Sophie of Anhalt =

- Countess of Schwarzburg-Rudolstadt
- Tenure: 1613–1652
- Born: 15 June 1584; Dessau
- Died: 9 June 1652 (aged 67); Oberkranichfeld
- Spouse: Charles Günther, Count of Schwarzburg-Rudolstadt
- House: Ascania
- Father: Joachim Ernest, Prince of Anhalt
- Mother: Eleonore of Württemberg

Anna Sophie of Anhalt (15 June 1584 – 9 June 1652) was by birth a member of the House of Ascania and princess of Anhalt. After her marriage, she became Countess of Schwarzburg-Rudolstadt.

Anna Sophie was born in Dessau, the eighth and youngest daughter of Joachim Ernest, Prince of Anhalt, but fourth-born daughter of his second wife Eleonore, daughter of Christoph, Duke of Württemberg.

== Life ==
In Rudolstadt on 13 June 1613 she married Charles Günther, Count of Schwarzburg-Rudolstadt. Their union was childless.

Anna Sophie was considered as one of the most educated women of her time. After the death of her husband in 1630 she moved her residence to Kranichfeld and founded there a performative literary culture society called the Virtuous Society. This society followed the example of the Fruitbearing Society, which was co-founded by her brother, Louis of Anhalt-Köthen.

At the same time, she took the famous educational reformer Wolfgang Ratke under her protection.

Anna Sophie died in Oberkranichfeld.

== Sources ==
- van Dixhoorn, Arjan; Sutch, Susie Speakman, eds. (2023). Performative Literary Culture Literary Associations and the World of Learning, 1200-1700. Brill. ISBN 978-90-04-44463-8.
  - van Dixhoorn, Arjan; Alvarez, Francisco J.; Ball, Gabriele. "Careers: The Role of Literary Exercise". In van Dixhoorn & Sutch (2023), pp. 140-170.
  - van Dixhoorn, Arjan; Ball, Gabriele. "Transformations: The Rise of New Institutions". In van Dixhoorn & Sutch (2023), pp. 171-202.
  - Ball, Gabriele. "Countess Anna Sophia of Schwarz-Rudolstadt and Her Concept of Virtue". In van Dixhoorn & Sutch (2023), pp. 340-354.
