= Günther XLI of Schwarzburg-Arnstadt =

Günther XLI, Count of Schwarzburg-Arnstadt
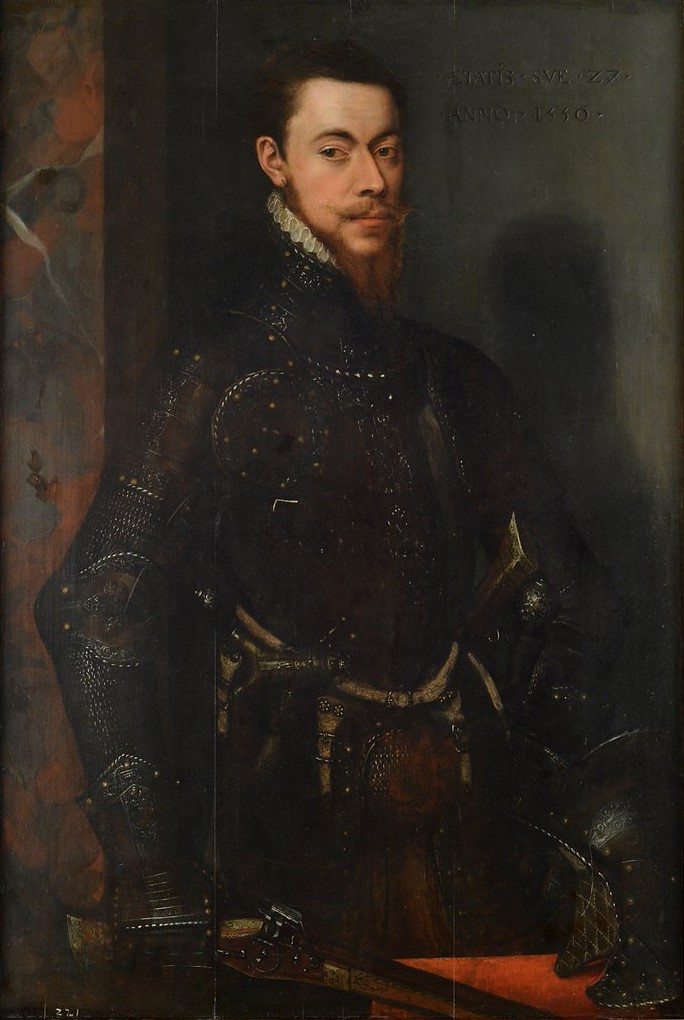
- Portrait of Günther XLI possibly by Antonis Mor, 1556
- Born: 25 September 1529; Sondershausen
- Died: 23 May 1583 (aged 53); Antwerp
- Buried: Sondershausen
- Noble family: House of Schwarzburg
- Spouse: Catherine of Nassau-Dillenburg
- Father: Günther XL, Count of Schwarzburg
- Mother: Elisabeth of Isenburg-Büdingen-Ronneburg

Günther XLI, Count of Schwarzburg-Arnstadt, nicknamed "the Quarrelsome" or Bellicosus, (25 September 1529 in Sondershausen – 23 May 1583 in Antwerp) was the ruling count of Schwarzburg from 1552 to 1571 and then Count of Schwarzburg-Arnstadt until his death.

== Life ==
Count Günther XLI was the eldest son of Count Günther XL of Schwarzburg (1490–1552), who was nicknamed the Rich or Günther with the fat mouth. His mother was Countess Elisabeth (d. 14 May 1572), the daughter of Count Philip of Isenburg-Büdingen-Ronneburg.

Günther XL had united all the possessions of Schwarzburg, except the Lordship of Leutenberg. After he died on 10 November 1552, his four surviving sons ruled jointly at first, with the younger brothers receiving assistance from their mother. However, in 1571, they divided the county among themselves.

Günther XLI began his military career in Vienna as Seneschal of Emperor Charles V. In 1553, he joined the imperial army which made an (ultimately unsuccessful) attempt to reconquer Metz. He then accompanied Philip, the later King Philip II of Spain to London, where Philip would marry Queen Mary I of England. In 1555, Günther XLI stayed in Brussels, where Charles V gave him 10000guilders. He then made a visit to Schwarzburg, and then returned to the imperial army, where he served as a colonel. In 1557, he fought on the victorious side at St. Quentin.

At the turn of 1559/1560, Günther travelled to Dresden on behalf of William the Silent, to take the first steps in the process that led to William marrying Anna of Saxony, the niece of Elector Augustus of Saxony on 24 August 1561. Günther had married William's sister, Catherine of Nassau-Dillenburg, on 17 November 1560 for political reasons. The marriage remained childless. The couple lived in Arnstadt for a while, where Günther used his 10000guilders to build Neideck Castle. Between 1563 and 1565, Günther and his younger brothers John Günther I and Albert VII fought in the army of King Frederick II of Denmark in the Northern Seven Years' War against Sweden.

In early 1566, Günther XLI returned to the Netherlands. On 12 March 1566, William the Silent gave a party at the castle of the Counts of Hoogstraten to celebrate his return. However, this was just a pretext. William wanted to discuss his strategy towards Margaret of Parma, who was Governor General of the Netherlands, with the other guests, the Counts of Egmont, Horn, Bergen, Meghen and Montigny.

A few weeks later, Günther fought in Hungary in the service of Emperor Maximilian II against the Turks. During this campaign, Günther acquired his nickname "the Quarrelsome". He was not respected by the Emperor. He often quarreled with the Emperor and did not obey orders. He protested against the Emperor's plan to besiege Esztergom. Maximilian wrote angrily to Vienna: Count Günther, does nothing but swagger. He prevents more than he achieves. His survey stated that I have 1500 horses here, but after I used them once, I see no more than 1000. I will probably think three times before I use this colonel again.

Nevertheless, the Emperor found new rôles for Günther. Günther was appointed to the Aulic Council and entrusted with diplomatic duties. In 1567, he worked in the service of Elector August of Saxony, on behalf of the Emperor. He participated in the siege of Gotha, which was necessary to arrest the deposed Duke John Frederick II of Saxe-Coburg-Eisenach, who had been banned for failure to deliver Wilhelm von Grumbach at the Emperor's demand. After Gotha surrendered, Günther arrested John Frederick II and brought him to Vienna.

From 1568 to 1573, Günther advised the Duke of Alba, the Spanish Governor General in the Netherlands. He then spent some time in Schwarzburg. In 1582, Emperor Rudolph II sent Günther to the Southern Netherlands again, where he advised Governor General Archduke Matthias as Privy Councillor.

Günther XLI died on 23 May 1583 in Antwerp. His body was transported from Antwerp to Delft, from there by boat to Emden and from there to Sondershausen, where he was buried.

As Günther XLI was childless, his younger brothers divided the County of Schwarzburg again after his death. John Günther I (1532–1586) received Arnstadt and Sondershausen and founded the Schwarzburg-Sondershausen line. Albrecht VII (1537–1605) received Rudolstadt and founded the Schwarzburg-Rudolstadt line. William I (1534–1597) received Frankenhausen. Despite marrying twice, William I died childless in 1597 and his share of the County fell to Albrecht VII.

== See also ==
- County of Schwarzburg
- House of Schwarzburg
