= Augusta Dorothea of Brunswick-Wolfenbüttel =

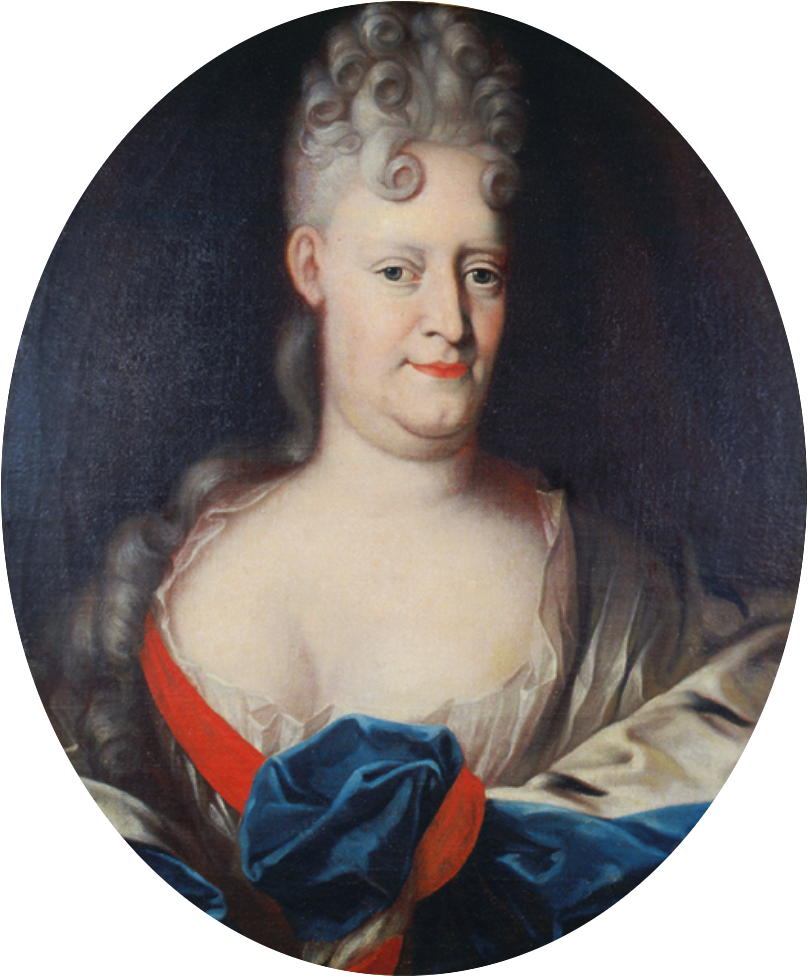
- Anonymous portrait, 18th century

Princess consort of Schwarzburg-Sondershausen
- Tenure: 3 September 1697 - 20 July 1716
- Born: 16 December 1666; Wolfenbüttel
- Died: 11 July 1751 (aged 84); Augustenburg Castle in Arnstadt
- Spouse: Anton Günther II, Count of Schwarzburg-Sondershausen-Arnstadt
- House: Guelph
- Father: Anthony Ulrich, Duke of Brunswick-Wolfenbüttel
- Mother: Elisabeth Juliane of Holstein-Norburg

Augusta Dorothea of Brunswick-Wolfenbüttel (16 December 1666 in Wolfenbüttel – 11 July 1751 at Augustenburg Castle in Arnstadt) was a daughter of the Duke Anthony Ulrich of Brunswick-Wolfenbüttel and his wife Juliane of Holstein-Norburg.

== Life ==
Auguste Dorothea married on 7 August 1684 in Wolfenbüttel to Count Anton Günther II of Schwarzburg-Sondershausen. He was elevated to Imperial Prince in 1697. The couple resided in Arnstadt; the marriage remained childless.

Auguste Dorothea survived her husband by 35 years. She spent her long widowhood at Augustenburg Castle in Arnstadt, building her famous dolls collection Mon Plaisir. These dolls were never intended as toys; they represent society in the style of a baroque Cabinet of curiosities. Augustenburg castle no longer exists; her doll collection has been moved to the New Palace in Arnstadt.
