= John Günther I of Schwarzburg-Sondershausen =

16th Century Count of Schwarzburg-Sonderhausen

John Günther I, Count of Schwarzburg-Sondershausen
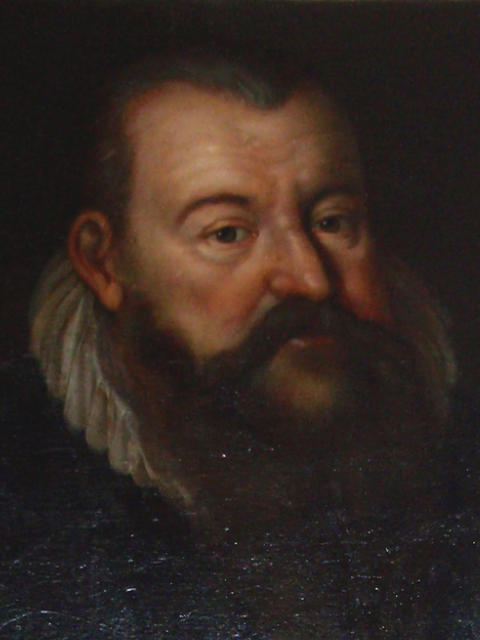
- 16th-century portrait
- Born: 20 December 1532; Sondershausen
- Died: 28 October 1586 (aged 53); Arnstadt
- Noble family: House of Schwarzburg
- Spouse: Anna of Oldenburg-Delmenhorst
- Father: Günther XL, Count of Schwarzburg
- Mother: Elisabeth of Isenburg-Büdingen-Ronneburg

John Günther I of Schwarzburg-Sondershausen (also known as Hans Günther or Johann Günther; 20 December 1532 in Sondershausen – 28 October 1586 in Arnstadt) was the co-ruler of Schwarzburg from 1552 until 1571 and the sole ruler Schwarzburg-Sondershausen from 1571 until his death in 1586. He is regarded as the progenitor of the line Schwarzburg-Sondershausen.

== Life ==
Count John Günther I was the son of the Count Günther XL of Schwarzburg (1490–1552), nicknamed Günther the Rich or Günther with the large Jaws, and his wife Elisabeth (d. 14 May 1572), a daughter of Count Philip of Isenburg-Büdingen-Ronneburg.

John Günther I was raised as a Catholic and destined for an ecclesiastical career. After his father's death, however, he converted to Lutheranism. He spent some time at the court of Elector Maurice of Saxony and fought in the Battle of Sievershausen on the side of Maurice against Albert Alcibiades, Margrave of Brandenburg-Kulmbach. Maurice's successor Augustus confirmed his tariff privilege on the salt trade in Frankenhausen.

After his father's death, John Günther I initially ruled Schwarzburg jointly with his three brothers. He chose the city of Sondershausen as his residence. In 1571, the brothers decided to divide the County. John Günther I's part was named Schwarzburg-Sondershausen, after its capital.

He fought in the Netherlands alongside his eldest brother Günther XLI and distinguished himself during the conquest of Saint-Quentin in 1583.

After his brothers Günther XLI of Schwarzburg-Arnstadt and William I of Schwarzburg-Frankenhausen had died without male heirs, John Günther I inherited Schwarzburg-Arnstadt and his remaining brother Albert VII inherited Schwarzburg-Frankenhausen.

== Marriage and issue ==
John Gunther married on 16 February 1566 with Anna (1539–1579), daughter of Anthony I, Count of Oldenburg. They had the following children:

- Ursula (1568)
- Sophie Elisabeth (1568–1621)
- Clara (1569–1639)
- Günther XLII (1570–1643), Count of Schwarzburg-Sondershausen
- Anton Henry (1571–1638), Count of Schwarzburg-Sondershausen
- Catharina (1572–1626), Deaness at Herford Abbey
- Sabine (1573–1628)
- Anna (1574–1640)
- Marie (1576–1577)
- John Günther II (1577–1631), Count of Schwarzburg-Sondershausen
- Christian Günther I (1578–1642), Count of Schwarzburg-Sondershausen
- Dorothea (1579–1639), married in 1604 Duke Alexander of Schleswig-Holstein-Sonderburg (1573–1627)
