= Christian Günther II of Schwarzburg-Sondershausen-Arnstadt =

Christian Günther II, Count of Schwarzburg-Sondershausen-Arnstadt
- Born: 1 April 1616
- Died: 10 September 1666 (aged 50)
- Noble family: House of Schwarzburg
- Spouse: Sophia Dorothea of Mörsperg-Beffort
- Father: Christian Günther I, Count of Schwarzburg-Sondershausen
- Mother: Anna Sibylle of Schwarzburg-Rudolstadt

Christian Günther II, Count of Schwarzburg-Sondershausen-Arnstadt (1 April 1616 – 10 September 1666) was Count of Schwarzburg-Sondershausen. From 1642 until his death, he ruled a part of the County around his residence in Arnstadt.

== Life ==
Count Christian Günther II was the son of Count Christian Günther I of Schwarzburg-Sondershausen (1578-1642), and his wife, Countess Anna Sibille (1584-1623), the daughter of Count Albert VII of Schwarzburg-Rudolstadt.

After the death of his father, the brothers were divided the County among themselves on and Christian Günther II received the entire Upper Schwarzburg-Sondershausen with his residence of Arnstadt.

== Marriage and issue ==
In 1645, Christian Günther II married since 1645 to Sophia Dorothea (d. 1685), the daughter of Count George of Mörsperg and Beffort, and they had the following children:

- Sibille Juliane (1646-1698), married Count Henry I of Reuss-Obergreiz (1668-1681)
- Sophia Dorothea (1647-1708), married Ernest, Count of Stolberg-Ilsenburg (1650-1710)
- Clara Sabine (1648-1698)
- Christine Elisabeth (1651-1670)
- Catherine Eleanor (1653-1685)
- John Günther IV (1654-1669), his successor, died unmarried and without issue

== See also ==
- House of Schwarzburg
- Schwarzburg-Sondershausen
