= Christian Günther I of Schwarzburg-Sondershausen =

Christian Günther I, Count of Schwarzburg-Sondershausen
- Born: 11 May 1578
- Died: 25 November 1642 (aged 64)
- Noble family: House of Schwarzburg
- Spouse: Anna Sibylle of Schwarzburg-Rudolstadt
- Father: John Günther I, Count of Schwarzburg-Sondershausen
- Mother: Anna of Oldenburg-Delmenhorst

Christian Günther I of Schwarzburg-Sondershausen (11 May 1578 – 25 November 1642) was the ruling Count of Schwarzburg-Sondershausen from 1601 until his death.

== Life ==
Count Christian Günther I was the son of Count John Günther I of Schwarzburg-Sondershausen (1532–1586) and his wife, Countess Anna (1539–1579), daughter of Count Anton I of Oldenburg-Delmenhorst.

Christian Günther I and his brothers were still minors when their father died in 1586 and they inherited Schwarzburg-Sondershausen. Their uncles Counts Anthony I (1505–1573) and John VII (1540–1603) of Oldenburg took up the regency. Later, the brothers ruled jointly.

In 1593, they inherited the County of Honstein, according to an inheritance treaty from 1433. However, other relatives of the Counts of Honstein also claimed the county, and after a lengthy dispute, the Counts of Schwarzburg-Sondershausen only received a small part of Honstein.

Schwarzburg-Sondershausen suffered badly during the Thirty Years' War, especially the city of Arnstadt and its surroundings. The brothers did their best to try to mitigate the burdens of war.

The brothers added the north wing to Sondershausen Palace.

== Marriage and issue ==
On 15 November 1612, Christian Günther I married Anna Sibylle (1584–1623), the daughter of Count Albert VII of Schwarzburg-Rudolstadt. They had the following children:

- Anna Juliane (1613–1652)
- John Günther III (1615–1616)
- Christian Günther II (1616–1666), nicknamed the Pious, Count of Schwarzburg-Sondershausen-Arnstadt
- Catharina Elisabeth (1617–1701), married Henry II of Reuss-Gera
- Sophie Eleanor (1618–1631)
- Anton Günther I (1620–1666), Count of Schwarzburg-Sondershausen
- Louis Günther II (1621–1681), Count of Schwarzburg-Sondershausen-Ebeleben
- Sophie Elisabeth (1622–1677)
- Clara Sabine (1623–1654)
