= Ebeleben =

- Town
- Coat of arms

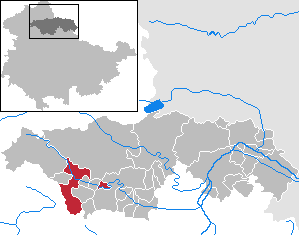
- Location of Ebeleben within Kyffhäuserkreis district
- Interactive map of Ebeleben
- Location within Germany Location within Thuringia
- Coordinates: 51°17′N 10°44′E
- Country: Germany
- State: Thuringia
- District: Kyffhäuserkreis
- Subdivisions: 5

Government
  - Mayor (2024–30): Steffen Gröbel

Area
  - Total: 44.54 km^{2} (17.20 sq mi)
- Elevation: 245 m (804 ft)

Population (2025-12-31)
  - Total: 2,667
  - Density: 59.88/km^{2} (155.1/sq mi)
- Time zone: UTC+01:00 (CET)
  - Summer (DST): UTC+02:00 (CEST)
- Postal codes: 99713
- Dialling codes: 036020
- Vehicle registration: KYF
- Website: www.stadt-ebeleben.de

Ebeleben (German pronunciation: [ˈeːbəˌleːbn̩]) is a town in the Kyffhäuserkreis district, in Thuringia, Germany. It is situated 13 km southwest of Sondershausen. The former municipality Thüringenhausen was merged into Ebeleben in December 2019.

== Twin town ==
- Üllő, Hungary
- Mitwitz, Germany
