= Johann Ernst Bach I =

Johann Ernst Bach
- Born: 1683
- Died: 1739 (aged 55–56)
- Instrument: Organ

Johann Ernst Bach (baptised 18 August [O.S. 8 August] 1683; died 21 March 1739) (also known as Johannes Ernestus Bach) was a German organist in the Bach family. He was born in Arnstadt as the third child of Johann Christoph Bach senior – twin brother of Johann Sebastian Bach's father, Johann Ambrosius Bach.

After his father's death, he grew up with relatives in Ohrdruf, where attended the Lyzeum together with his cousin Johann Sebastian. From April 1701, he lived in Hamburg for half a year, to study the organ. After that, he worked in Frankfurt as a musician.

In 1705, he returned to Arnstadt, where he temporarily played the organ in the New Church as a substitute for Johann Sebastian Bach. Johann Ernst visited Johann Sebastian when he moved from Arnstadt to Lübeck to hear the famous organist in Marienkirche, Dieterich Buxtehude. After Johann Sebastian had moved to Mühlhausen in 1707, Johann Ernst applied to succeed him, which was granted to him in 1708. His salary was less than half that of his predecessor. In 1728, he also became organist of the Oberkirche and the Liebfrauenkirche.

An application for the post of organist in Gehren in 1727 was not successful.

Nothing is known of any compositions of his own. It is possible, however, that he was the previous owner of the Altbachisches Archiv (Old Bach's archive).

== Literature ==
- Christoph Wolff (2001). BACH: Essays on His Life and Music. Harvard University Press. ISBN 0674059263.
- Christoph Wolff (2001). Johann Sebastian Bach: The Learned Musician. W. W. Norton & Company. ISBN 0393322564.
