= Meine Seele soll Gott loben, BWV 223 =

Church cantata

Meine Seele soll Gott loben (My soul will praise God), BWV 223, is a church cantata probably composed by Johann Sebastian Bach in Mühlhausen around 1707. The music of the cantata is lost, except for four measures of the theme of the closing fugue, which were given by Spitta. According to Spitta, the cantata included a duet aria for soprano and bass.

The cantata has also been attributed to Johann Ernst Bach and George Frideric Handel.
