= Oberkirche, Arnstadt =

Oberkirche
- "Upper Church"
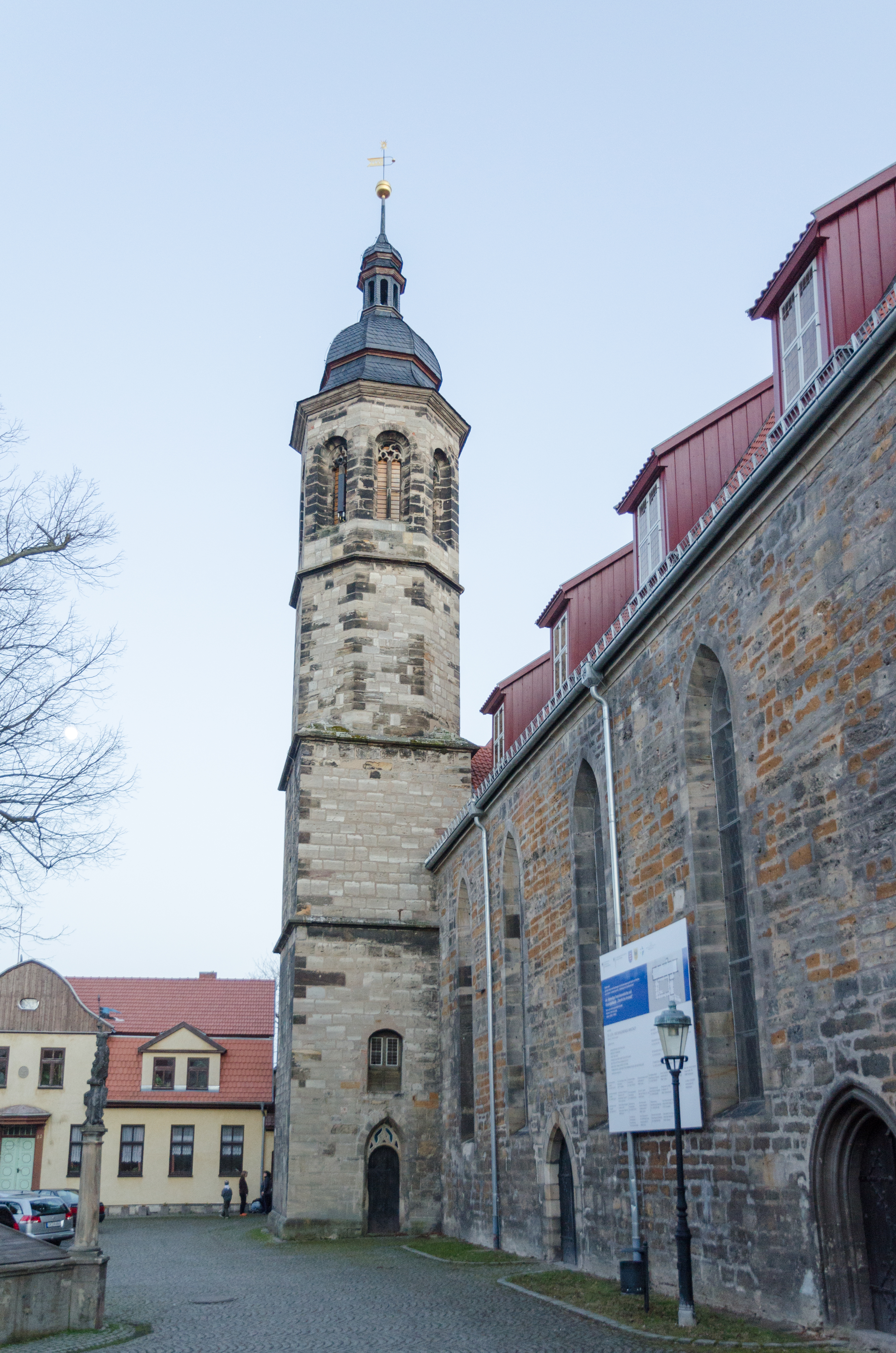

- Location within Thuringia Location within Germany
- 50°49′57″N 10°56′45″E
- Location: Arnstadt, Thuringia
- Country: Germany
- Denomination: Lutheran
- Previous denomination: Roman Catholic

History
- Status: Parish church
- Founded: around 1250
- Founder: Franciscans

Architecture
- Functional status: Active
- Style: Gothic
- Years built: 13th to 15th century

Administration
- Province: Evangelical Church in Central Germany

The Oberkirche (pronounced [ˈoːbɐˌkɪʁçə], "Upper Church") in the Thuringian town of Arnstadt, Germany, is a former Franciscan monastery church mainly built in the 13th century. Since 1538, it has been used by the Lutheran parish of Arnstadt, which today belongs to the Gotha district of the Evangelical Church in Central Germany. It is a Kulturdenkmal (listed cultural heritage site).

== Building description ==
The church stands on a hill on the southern edge of Arnstadt's historical centre. It is a long, rectangular, single-aisle building made of unplastered quarrystone and a gable roof. The interior measures 60 by 11 metres (197 ft × 36 ft) and is closed off at the top by a wooden barrel vault. The straight east wall has three high windows with tracery ends. The central one is three-light and is flanked by two lower, two-light windows. At the corners of the east wall are four-stepped buttresses. The north side has several two-light lancet windows, while the south wall – except for two windows in the choir area – is windowless because of the adjoining convent buildings. In the western part of the north wall, there is a walled Late Romanesque window from around 1250, possibly from a previous building. On the north side, there is a church tower added subsequently. On the south side, there is an inner courtyard with a small cloister from which the convent buildings were accessed.

Today, the interior is characterised above all by the large Early Baroque altar, the lords' seats and galleries as well as the baptismal font, all of which date from the 17th century. Numerous paintings from the same period show biblical scenes and decorate the balustrades of the galleries.

== History ==
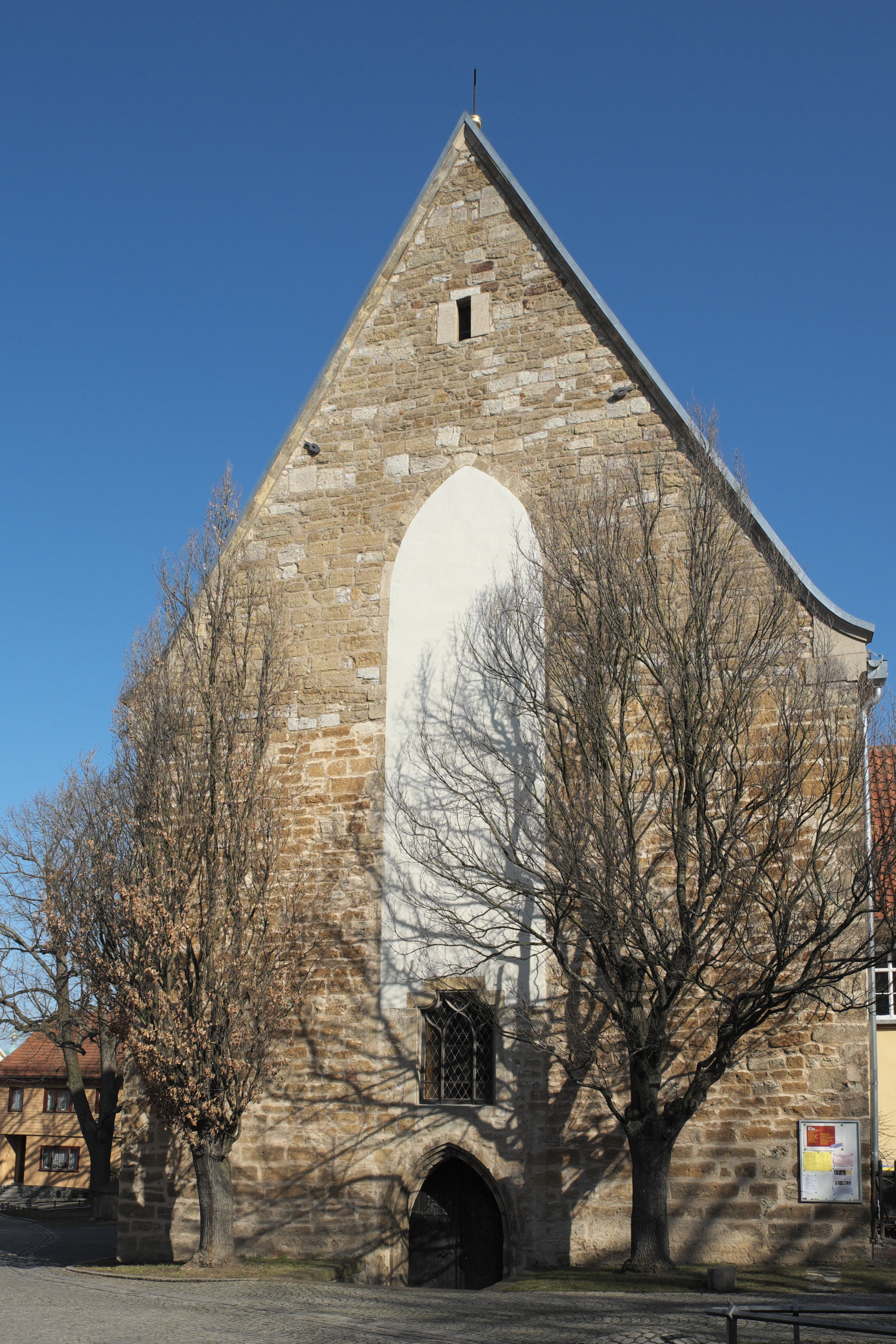
The western gable wall

The first friars of the Franciscan Order, founded in 1210, came to Arnstadt in 1246 from Gotha, where they had to leave their settlement founded in 1225. The Franciscans, also known as the Discalced (meaning "barefoot", Barfüßer in German), who belonged to the Saxon Province of the Order (Saxonia), were apparently well received in Arnstadt and began to build a church and monastery on a hill in the old part of the town; the monastery was first mentioned in a document in 1266. The buildings were kept plain – as a mendicant church – in accordance with the rules of the Order. A tower was initially dispensed with. The construction of the convent building dragged on until the 14th century. In 1461, a bell tower was built into the north wall, which also helped to counteract the severe deformation of the north wall of the nave. In 1498, the church obtained an elaborately carved Gothic winged altar, which today stands in the Liebfrauenkirche.

After the introduction of the Reformation in Arnstadt in 1533, the Franciscans were granted a short period of time to consider professing the Reformation in 1538. However, they refused and then had to vacate the monastery in "great anger". In 1539, the church fell to the town of Arnstadt and the monastery to the count's house. On the initiative of Günther XL, Count of Schwarzburg-Blankenburg, a count's educational institution was opened in 1540. His son Count Günther XLI closed the institution in 1561 and gave the monastery to Leo von Packmor, the count's colonel, as a retirement home.

After the town fire in 1581, von Packmor released the monastery building first as emergency accommodation, later after his death (1583) in his will for the church and school. Since St Boniface's Church (predecessor of the Bach Church) had fallen victim to the town fire, the former Barfüßerkirche, now called Oberkirche ("Upper Church", referring to its location), became the town's main church. The organ was renewed for the first time in 1588. The pulpit, donated by von Packmor among others, was consecrated in 1589. His bequest also formed the basis for the church's valuable library. At the end of the 16th century, the basement of the nobility's chamber to the left of the altar and the lower galleries were built. In 1609 to 1610, the ceiling was renovated. In 1611, a new organ was built by Ezechiel Groitzscher from Eisleben. Afterwards, the valuable and today still essentially existing furnishings above the upper part of the nobility seat, the prince's seat, the pulpit (1625), the baptismal font (1639) through to the three-storey high altar (1641) were installed in the church interior. After the Baroque furnishing of the pulpit and altar by the Arnstadt artist Burchard Röhl, the old pulpit was moved to the Liebfrauenkirche in 1624 and the Gothic altar in 1642, where they can still be found today.

From 1640 until his death in 1692, Heinrich Bach was organist at the Oberkirche. In 1715, further galleries were installed and the pulpit was altered. In 1725, the current barrel vault and the mansard windows were installed by the master carpenter Lange, who also made the necessary interventions in the roof construction (additional construction timbers on the inside of the spar to fix the barrel formwork with a new and narrower radius). The second Bach at the organ of the Oberkirche was Johann Ernst (1683–1739), who also played the organ in the Liebfrauenkirche from 1728 until his death. In 1746, the tower received a Baroque cupola in place of the steep pyramid roof that it probably had before. Two years later, the church was presumably re-roofed. The installation of a new organ by Johann Stephan Schmaltz, which lasted from 1751 to 1756 or 1760, marked the end of an era of substantial building activity.

At the end of the 19th century, an extremely poor structural condition of the Oberkirche was reported. As a result, comprehensive restoration work was begun in 1899 and lasted until 1901. Many church stalls were removed, the barrel ceiling was plastered, the gravestones and epitaphs lying in the floor were raised, the concrete floor was inserted and the church was painted. In 1902, a new organ was installed by the Wilhelm Sauer company. In 1909, the church was equipped with steam heating.

In 1942, the bell, cast in 1587 by Melchior Möring, had to be delivered for war purposes. In 1946, by decision of the parish church council, the "Klengel" from the Liebfrauenkirche was hung in the Oberkirche. During the Second World War, a bomb hit partially uncovered the roof and knocked through about ten square metres (110 ft^{2}) of the barrel vault; in addition, there was a wall penetration of about one square metre (11 ft^{2}), and four altar windows were completely smashed. After the necessary work and the removal of the galleries from 1715, the church was put back into use in 1947 and the parish was staffed again in 1949.

Only 25 years later, severe damage to the substance became apparent again. Leaks in the roof harmed the construction and furnishings, so that the Oberkirche had to be closed in 1977. Backlogs in renovation and penetrating rain led to serious decay of the interior furnishings over the years. The northern nobility seat and the pulpit were removed and put into storage, as were the figures of the baptismal font. The Sauer organ from the Gründerzeit era was no longer functional.

After the German reunification in 1990, the church was renovated step by step. The historical furnishings were reinstalled in their original places after the masonry was refurbished. Other buildings of the former monastery now serve the Lutheran parish of Arnstadt as offices, housing and a community centre.

== Interior ==
=== Works of art ===
- Gothic wooden wall crucifix (c. 1350)
- Celebrant seats
- Seat of the nobility (c. 1590)
- Princely seat (1595)
- Countess Katharina's seat (1595)
- Galleries with painting (c. 1600), after the model of woodcuts of a picture bible printed by Johann Krafft from Wittenberg in 1547; painting on the gallery on the west side of the church with pictures from the childhood of Jesus
- Pulpit, consecrated Easter 1625
- Crucifix by Burchard Röhl from Arnstadt (c. 1630), which had its location on the altar step
- Baptismal font made of wood and metal by Burchard Röhl (1639)
- High altar, donated by Count Günther XLII, created in 1641 by Burchard Röhl and consecrated at Easter 1642, with a total of 33 figures and six pictures
- Small countess seat (1645)
- Various paintings of clergymen as well as Martin Luther and Philip Melanchthon from different periods, currently in storage
- Paintings of the superintendent Johann Gottfried Olearius (1635–1711) as well as two paintings (after 1737) by the court painter Gottfried Wunderlich
- Portrait (c. 1810) of the deacon Johann Carl Umbreit (died 1820)
- Organ by the Wilhelm Sauer company (1902)
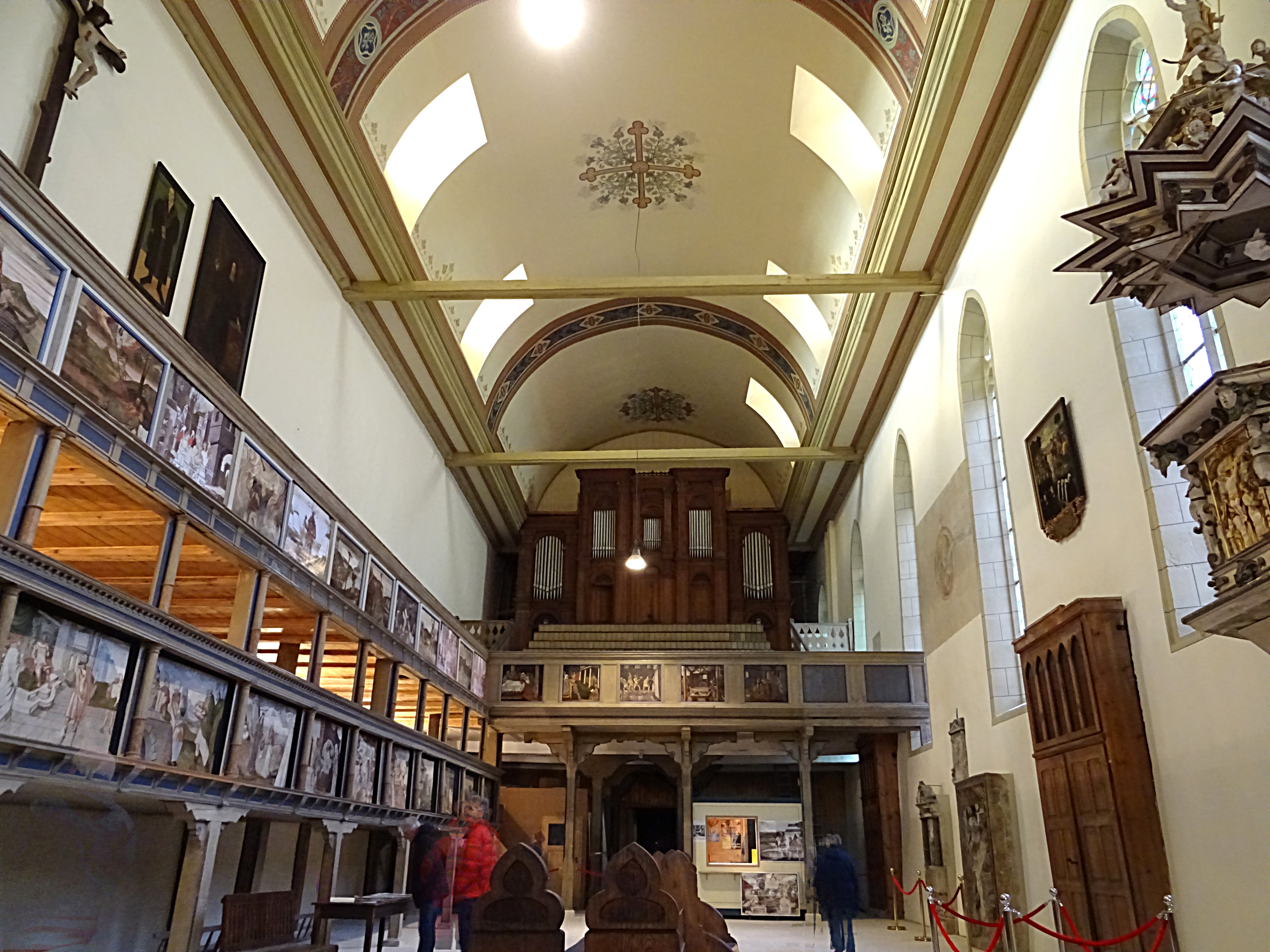
Interior view

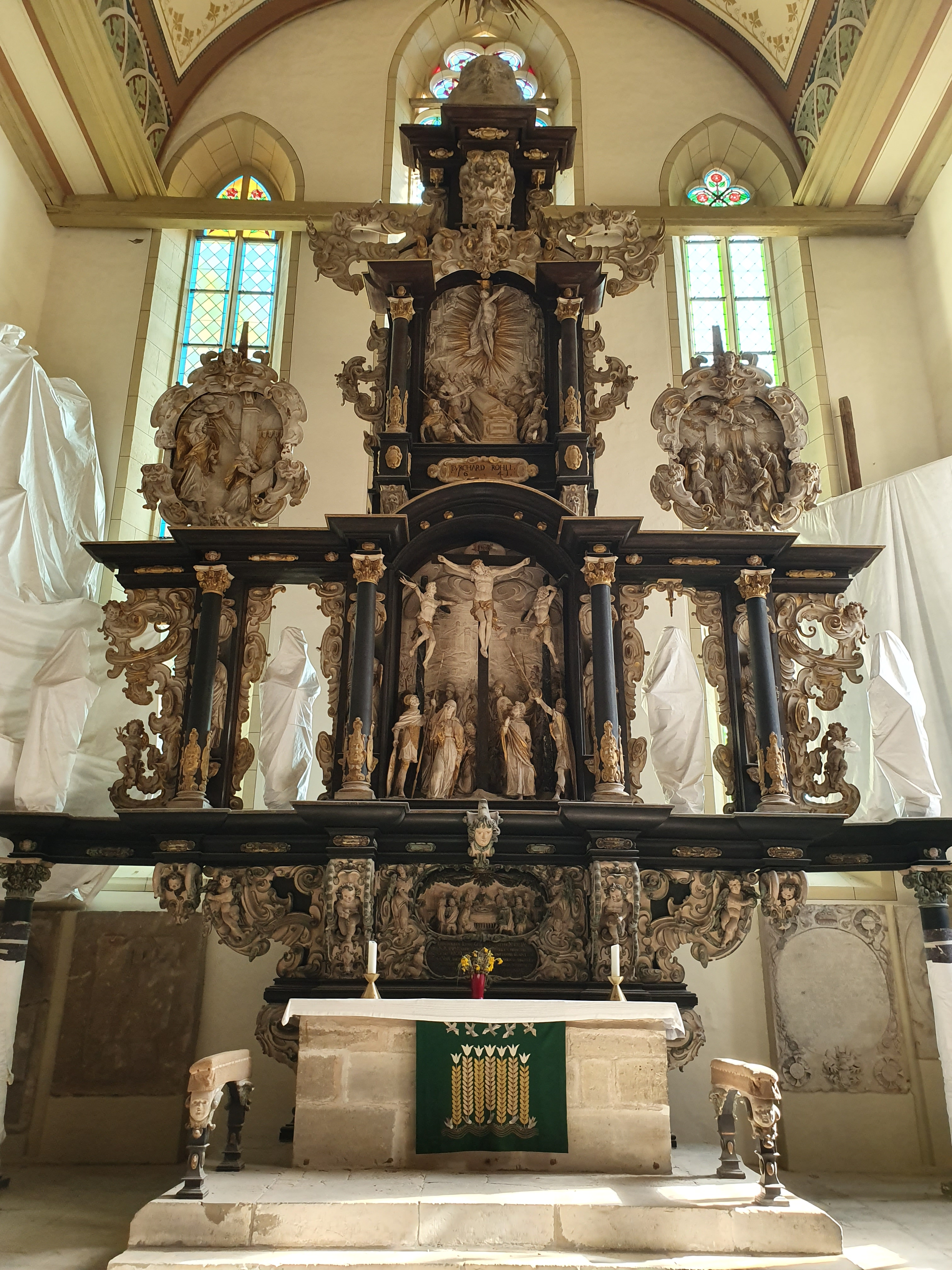
High altar

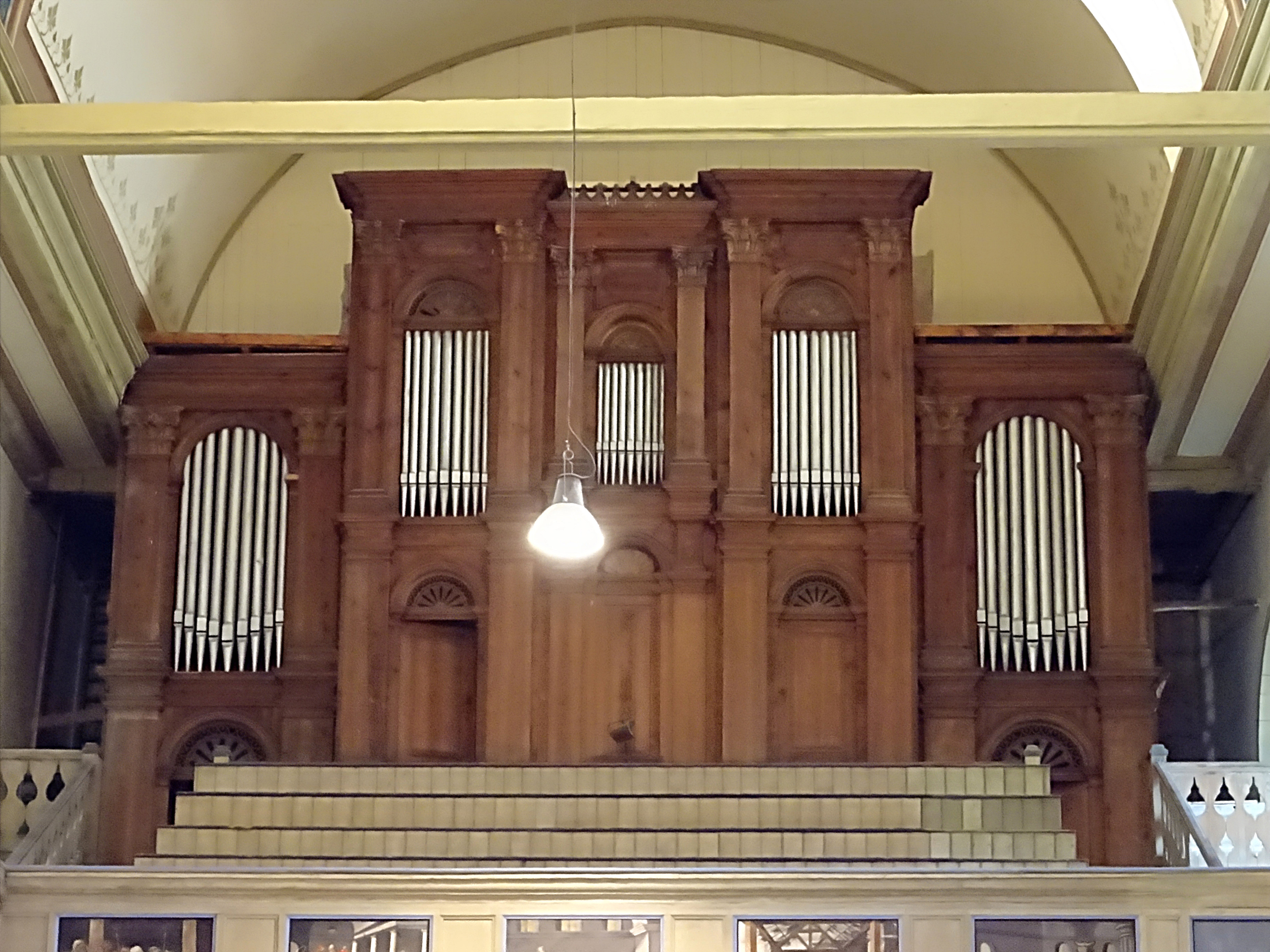
Sauer organ

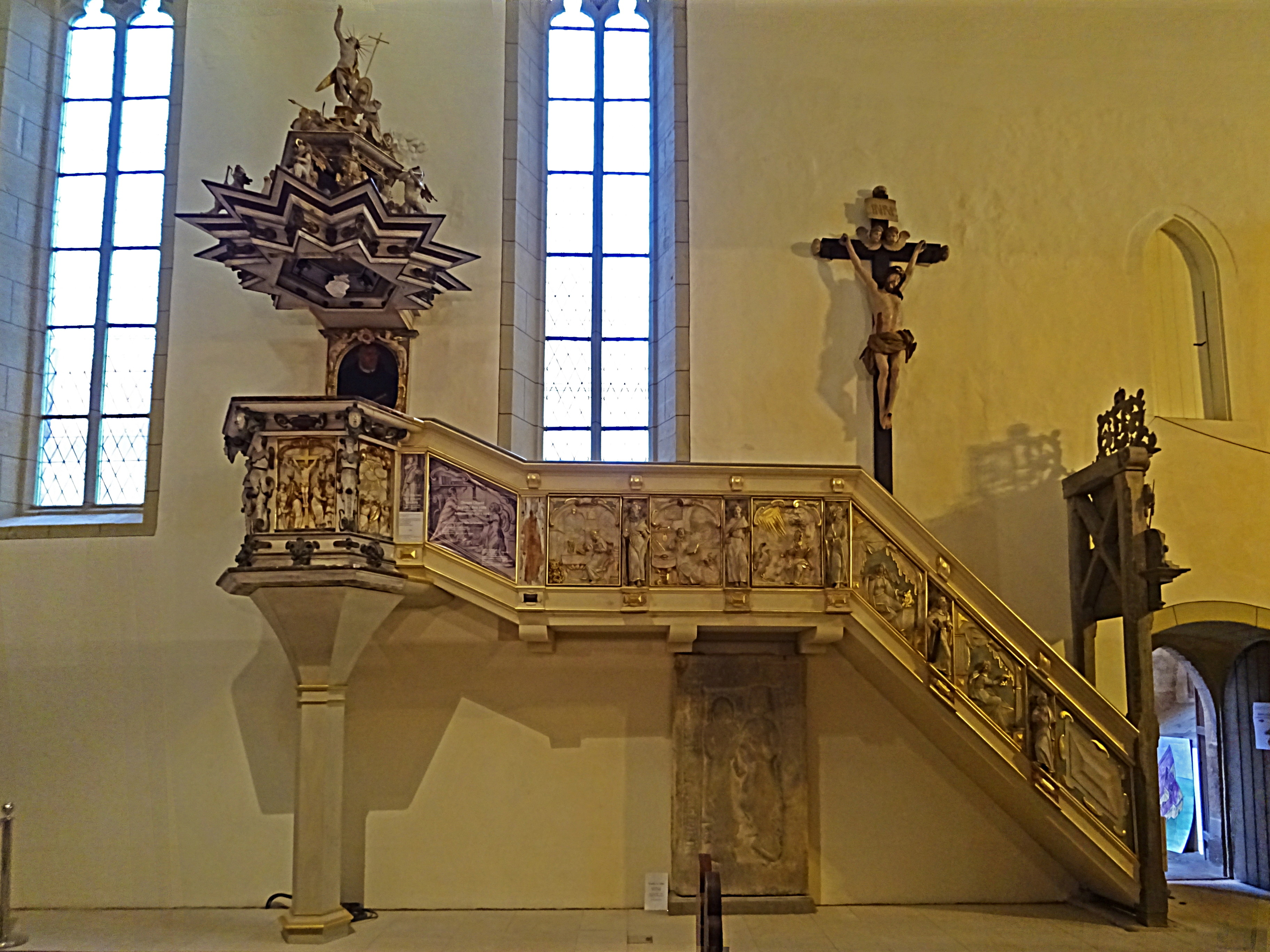
Pulpit

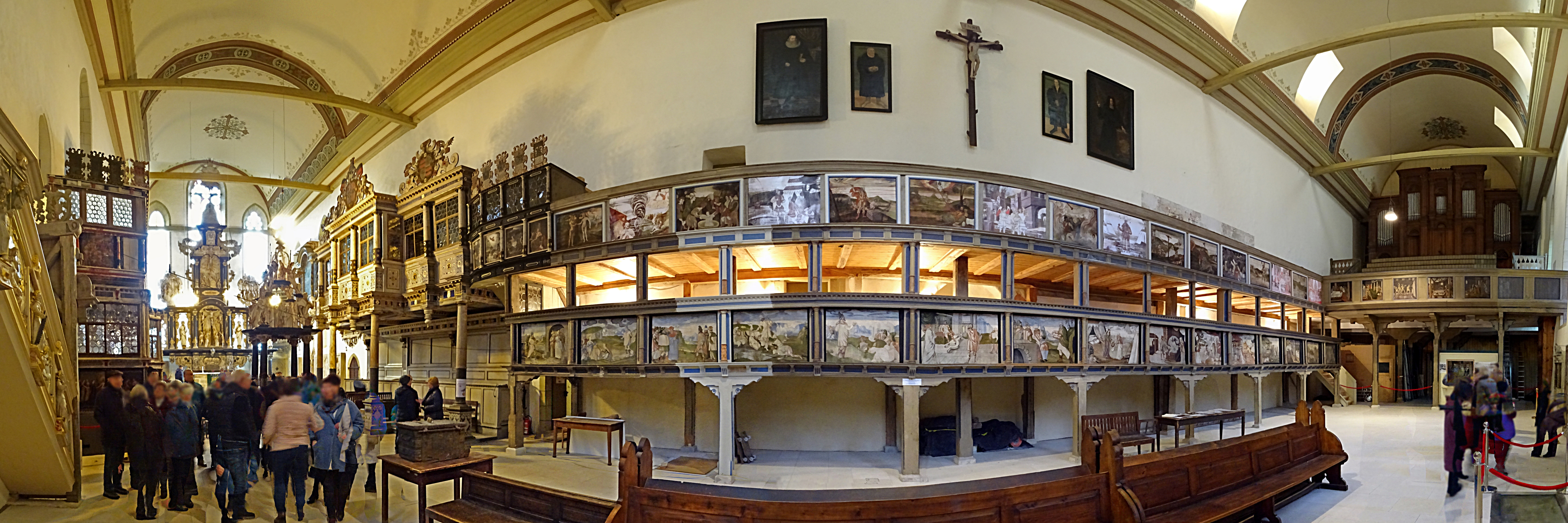
Interior panorama

=== Epitaphs and tomb slabs ===
==== North wall ====
- Epitaph of D. Nicolaus Scheller, Schwarzburg councillor (died 1581), three-winged altarpiece donated to the church by Countess Katharina in 1594 from the inventory of Neideck Castle. The painting by the Dutch painter Frans Floris (died 1572) makes it probably the most important work of art in the Oberkirche. An added memorial plaque commemorates Count Günther XLI.
- Epitaph of Catharina Güttich (died 1628, 34 years), wife of the chancellor Johann Caspar Güttich (designed by Burchard Röhl, Arnstadt 1629).
- Tomb slabs of Katharina von Witzleben (died 1501); chancellor Dr. Andreas Gerhard, Schwarzburg councillor (died 1623); Sophia Elisabeth Tentzel (died 1694); children of superintendent Tentzel (died 1685); superintendent Dr. Jacob Tentzel (died 1673); Obristleutnant Hartenack Christian von Wangelin auf Vilis Braunschweig-Lüneburg (died 1678); Utha von Schwarzburg, née von Henneberg-Hartenberg (died 1346); tomb slab presumably of a Knight of Witzleben (died 1520).

==== East wall ====
- Epitaph of chancellor Hieronymus Hedenus (died 1670).
- Epitaph of mayor Erasmus Kilian, 1545 mayor (died 1576, buried in the Old Cemetery), resurrection image: risen Christ, flag of victory, sleeping guards, below angel with Kilian's coat of arms; by stonemason Donath Fritzsch (sign top right).
- Tomb slab of chancellor Dr. Heinrich Schneidewein (died 1580), work by Cranach.
- Gravestone of Georg Fischer (died 1505), owner of the smelting works (Am Kupferrasen, Arnstadt). It is the most artistically significant stone; it depicts the Gregory Mass.
- Tomb slabs of Catharina (died 1492); chancellor Hieronymus Hedenus (died 1670), Luther rose with bronze plate.

==== South wall ====
- Epitaphs of Landrentmeister Christoph Kirchberger (died 1593), Schwarzburg councillor; Landrentmeister Ludwig Koch (died 1620), Schwarzburg councillor; Leo von Packmor (died 1583), Colonel under Count Günther XLI (dislocated).
- Tomb slabs of Landrentmeister Ludwig Koch (died 1621); Landrentmeister Christoph Kirchberger (died 1593); chancellor Johannes Börner (died 1587); Knight Rudolf von Hopfgarten (died 1529); Leo von Packmor (died 1583).

== Bibliography ==
- Bötefür, Oliver (2008). Die Oberkirche zu Arnstadt (in German). Arnstadt.
- Orban, Hans-Ulrich (2008). Chronik der Oberkirche (in German). Arnstadt.
- Dehio, Georg (1998). Handbuch der deutschen Kunstdenkmäler. Thüringen (in German). München/Berlin: Deutscher Kunstverlag. ISBN 3-422-03050-6.
