= Johann Gottlieb Lindner =

German pedagogue, historian and author

- Born: 17 March 1726; Bärenstein, Saxony
- Died: 18 December 1811 (aged 85); Arnstadt, Saxe-Weimar-Eisenach
- Occupations: pedagogue, historian, writer

Johann Gottlieb Lindner (17 March 1726 – 18 December 1811) was a German pedagogue, historian and author. In 1894 he became the director of the Lyceum of Arnstadt and Schwarzburg.

== Life ==
Johann Gottlieb Lindner was born in Bärenstein, a small town in Saxony, right on the frontier with Bohemia. The area was known for its ore mines, and Lindner's father was a miner. His first recorded employment was as a teacher at the Kreuzschule (literally School of the Cross) in Dresden. During this period he supplemented his meagre earnings by working as a musical performer and was thereby able to work his way up the social scale.

He commenced a study course at Leipzig University in 1748, becoming a Master (Magister) of Philology. In 1751, on the recommendation of the local Superintendent Johann Christian Ernesti, Lindner was appointed co-rector at Langensalza, where he would have been working with Ernesti. In 1761 he became a member of the Erfurt Academy of Public Sciences. In 1765 he was appointed deputy to the Rector of the regionally important Grammar school (Gymnasium) in Arnstadt, where he himself took over as Rector in 1794. Subsequently, he became the Advisor for School Matters to the Principality of Schwarzburg-Sondershausen.

== The writer ==
Lindner wrote extensively on Philology, History, Topography and Numismatics. One of his students, Johann Christian von Hellbach, later became a publisher and produced a compilation of his writings. It was also von Hellbach who edited and published Lindner's autobiography.

== Published output (not a complete list) ==
- Magister Johann Gottlieb Lindners Directors der Stadt- und Landschule zu Arnstadt, auch Beysitzers des fürstlich schwarzburg-sondershäusischen Consistorii in Schulsachen daselbst kurze Selbstbiographie, mit Anmerkungen, einem Nachtrage und einigen Beylagen von (with annotations, an epilogue and some contributions from) Johann Christian von Hellbach (Ed.), Arnstadt 1812
- Analectorum Paulino-Cellensium, 21 parts, 1789–1804
- Nachlese zur schwarzburgischen Geschichte, 11 parts, 1783–1792
- Lehrreicher Zeitvertreib in Ovidianischen Verwandlungen, Leipzig 1764
- Etwas über Mythen, Arnstadt 1796
- Grundlegung zur deutschen Sprachlehre für Anfänger, Arnstadt 1772
