= Johann Christian von Hellbach =

German lawyer and writer (1757-1828)

- Born: Johann Christian Hellbach; 15 July 1757; Arnstadt, Saxe-Weimar
- Died: 18 October 1828 (aged 71); Arnstadt, Saxe-Weimar-Eisenach
- Occupations: Lawyer writer historian
- Spouse: Charlotte Friedericka Wilhelmina Ernestina von Berga (1789)

Johann Christian von Hellbach 15 July 1757 – 18 October 1828) was a German lawyer and writer. He wrote extensively but not exclusively on history.

== Life ==
Johann Christian Hellbach was born in Arnstadt, a small but locally important town in central Germany, which earlier in the century had been the home town of Johann Sebastian Bach. Hellbach's father was Ludwig Gottfried Hellbach. At the local school Hellbach's teacher was the historian Johann Gottlieb Lindner. (In 1812 Hellbach would edit and publish Lindner's autobiography.) On leaving school, between 1777 and 1780 Hellbach studied Jurisprudence, after which he lived in Arnstadt.

From 1788 he lived on his estate at Berga, roughly 100 km (60 miles) to the north. During this period he was also employed closer to Arnstadt, at Wechmar, working as Commission Secretary for the Duchy of Saxe-Meiningen. In the end he returned to living full-time in Arnstadt, promoted to the post of Advocate and Legal Counsel for the Principality of Saxe-Meiningen.

== Personal ==
Hellbach married Charlotte Friedericka Wilhelmina Ernestina von Berga at his Berga estate on 17 May 1789.

== Ennoblement ==
On 3 December 1819 Prince Günther Friedrich Carl confirmed and renewed the ancient nobility of Hellbach's family within Schwarzburg-Sondershausen. In terms of the sources, it was at this point that the name "Hellbach" became "von Hellbach".
