= Johann Friedrich Wender =

German organ builder (1655–1729)

Johann Friedrich Wender (baptized 6 December 1655 – 13 June 1729) was a German organ builder who had his workshop in Mühlhausen.

Born in Dörna, Thuringia, Wender collaborated with Johann Sebastian Bach, who obtained his first position as an organist in Arnstadt from 1703, after he had inspected and demonstrated a new organ which Wender had built there. In 1707 Bach moved to Mühlhausen, where Wender worked. Wender died in Dörna.

Notable students of Wender include his son Christian Friedrich Wender, his son-in-law Johann Nikolaus Becker, Johann Christian Dauphin and Johann Jacob John.

== Selected works ==
Year	Location	Building	Image	Manuals	Stops	Notes
1689–1691	Mühlhausen	Divi Blasii		II/P	29	expanding, partly new
1695	Seligenstadt	Abtei		II/P	31	
1699–1703	Arnstadt	New Church		II/P	29	new organ for the new church (today: Bach Church) which replaced the burned St. Bonifatius
1700	Weimar	Stadtkirche				restoration
1708	Mühlhausen	Divi Blasii		III/P	38	Rebuilding following Bach's suggestions. The survival of Bach's specifications has allowed the reconstruction of this lost organ.
1714	Erfurt	St. Severi		II/P	24	Case extant
1714–1717	Merseburg	Dom- und Schlosskirche		IV/P	66	repair and completion of the instrument begun in 1695 by Zacharias Theißner
1716–1722	Merseburg	St. Maximi				new organ, inspected on 11/12 May 1722 by Thomaskantor Johann Kuhnau and Georg Friedrich Kauffmann

== Literature ==
- Meinhold, Wieland (1987). Der Mühlhäuser Orgelbauer Johann Friedrich Wender und sein Wirken im Bereich des mitteldeutschen barocken Orgelbaues (in German). pp. 36–41.
- Uwe Pape (ed.) (2009), Lexikon norddeutscher Orgelbauer, Band 1: Thüringen und Umgehung, S. 331 (in German), Berlin: Pape Verlag, ISBN 978-3-921140-86-4
- Wolff, Christoph Wolff; Zepf, Markus (2008). Die Orgeln J. S. Bachs – Ein Handbuch (in German). Leipzig: Evangelische Verlagsanstalt. ISBN 978-3-374-02407-0.
