= Johann Christian Dauphin =

- Born: 22 February 1682; Thüringen
- Died: 14 May 1730 (aged 48); Kleinheubach
- Occupation: organ builder
- Notable work: three-manual organ for the Walldürn Basilica
- Children: Johann Christian II

Johann Christian Dauphin (22 February 1682 -14 May 1730) was a German organ builder.

== Life ==
Johann Christian Dauphin was a student of Johann Friedrich Wender in Mühlhausen, Thüringen and was recommended for maintenance on his organ in Seligenstadt.

From about 1707 he settled in Kleinheubach, where he married in 1707. In 1714 he was put in charge of the organs in the County of Erbach.

His greatest work was the three-manual organ for the Walldürn Basilica which is probably the only largely preserved organ is in the old Catholic parish church of St. Anna in Sulzbach am Main. In addition, some prospectuses have been preserved.

His brother Johann Eberhard Dauphin was also an organ builder. His son Johann Christian II (June 12, 1713 in Kleinheubach; died May 8, 1772, in Kleinheubach) and his grandson Johann Christian III. (January 16, 1752 in Kleinheubach; died May 2, 1792, in Kleinheubach) were also organ builders and continued to run the workshop. It went out around 1800.

== Works ==
Year	Location	Church	Image	Manual	Register	Remarks
1710	Kleinheubach	Ev. Pfarrkirche St. Martin		I/P	12	Prospectus preserved and reconstructed.
1713	Buchen (Odenwald)	Catholic Church		I/P	12	received nothing more
1717/1723	Walldürn	St. George Wallfahrts Basilica		III/P	32	Prospectus received, accord of August 30, 1713 received, new building completed Hans-Theodor Vleugels 1975, today III/40
1720	Kloster Schmerlenbach	former monastery church, today cath. Parish Church and Pilgrimage Church		I/P	12	1882 transferred to Sulzbach
um 1720	Sulzbach am Main	St. Anna, old catholic church		I/P	12	Originally for the Schmerlenbach monastery. The instrument was installed here by Bruno Müller around 1882 and slightly modified. Restoration by Vleugels Organmanufactur in 1999
1721	Hergershausen	Ev. Kirche		I	8	Pedal was added in 1784; Organ replaced by a new building in 1912, prospectus preserved

== Bibliography ==
- Hermann Fischer; Theodor Wohnhaas (1994). Lexicon of southern German organ builders. Wilhelmshaven: Florian Noetzel Verlag, Heinrichshofen-Bücher. ISBN 3-7959-0598-2.
- Bohner/Vleugel's organ in the Walldürn Basilica
- L. Eisenträger, organ consecration in St. Anna Sulzbach on December 5, 1999
