= Ernst August Nicolai =

German physician and naturalist

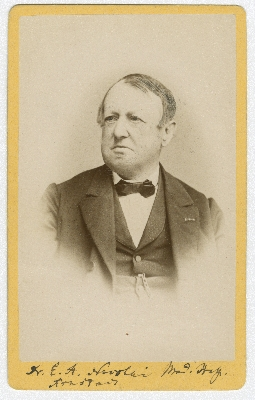
Ernst August Nicolai

Ernst August Nicolai (1800, Arnstadt –1875, Arnstadt), was a German medical doctor and naturalist. He is known for his work on botany and Coleoptera.

== Works ==
partial list

- Nicolai EA (1822) Dissertatio inauguralis medica sistens Coleopterorum species agri Halensis. Grunert, Halae, 1–48.

The standard author abbreviation Nicolai is used to indicate this person as the author when citing a botanical name.
