= Kreuzschule =

Coordinates: 51°2′50″N 13°48′5″E

- Schola crucis
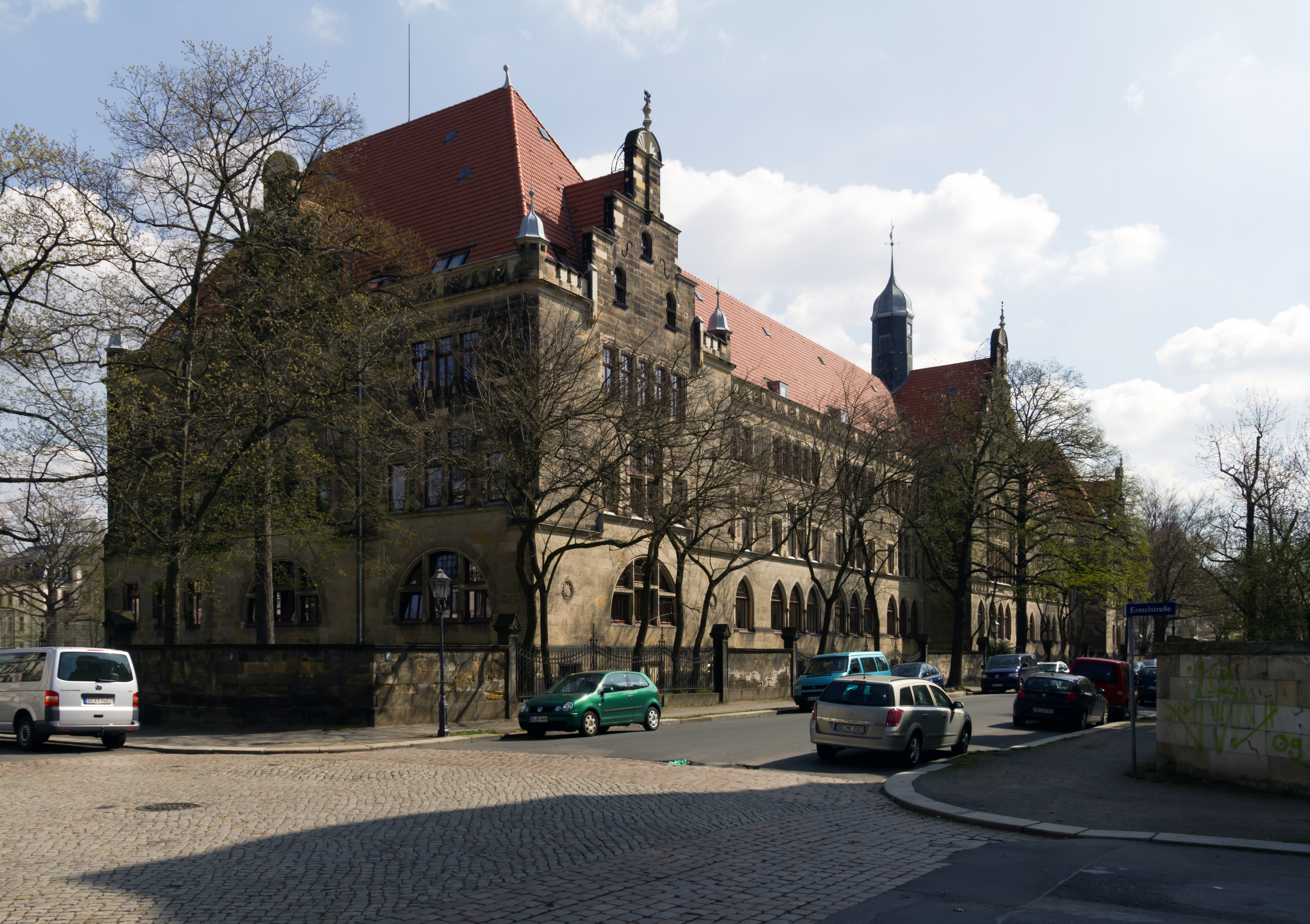
- Kreuzschule, main building, 2011
- Dresden, Saxony; Germany

Information
- School type: Gymnasium
- Motto: "schola crucis, schola lucis" (School of the Cross, School of Light)
- Religious affiliation: Kreuzkirche
- Denomination: Protestant since 1539
- Established: 6 April 1300
- Enrollment: 850; 145 singers of the Dresdner Kreuzchor (2009)
- Website: www.kreuzschule.de

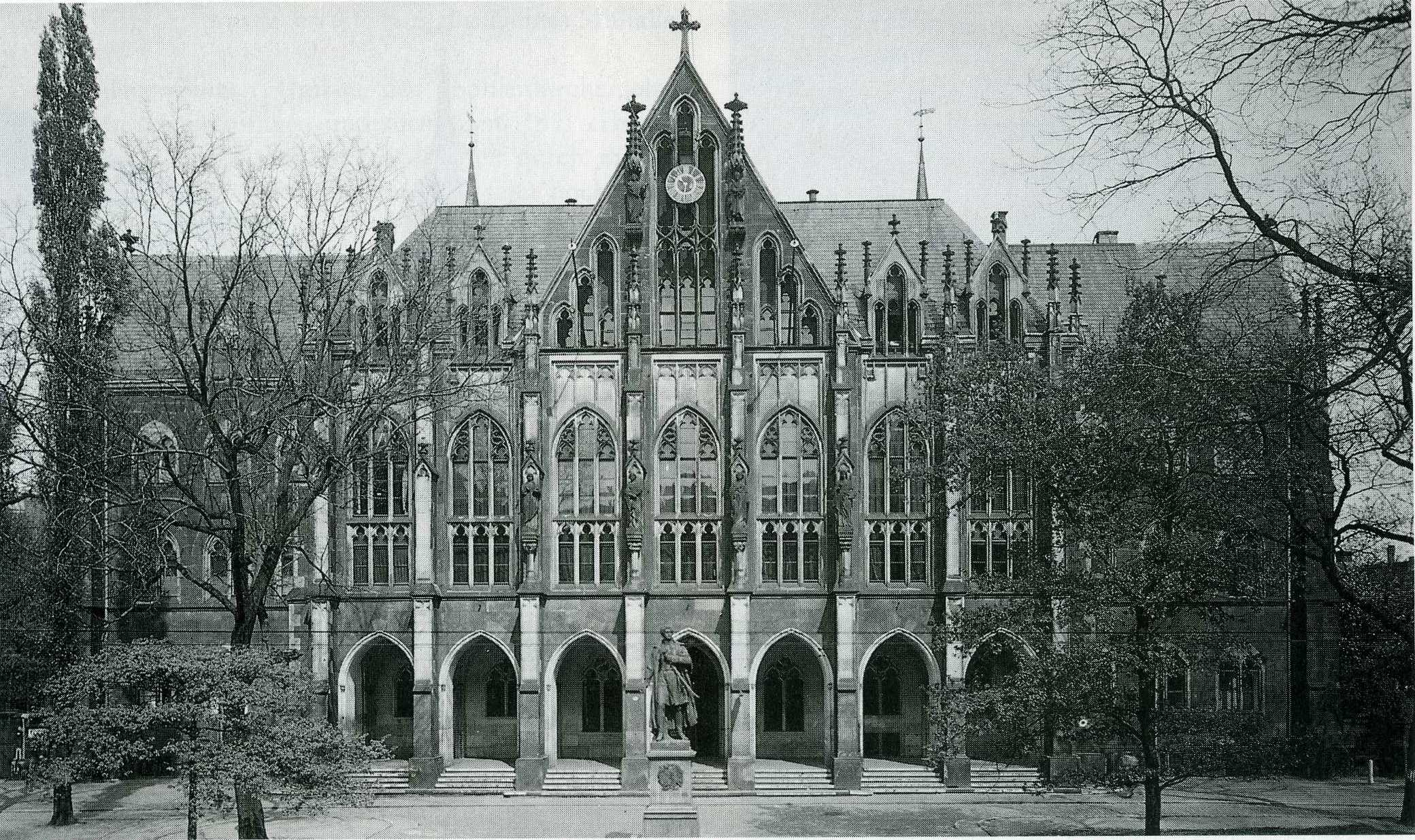
Kreuzschule, neogothic building of 1866, destroyed in 1945

The Kreuzschule (German for "School of the Cross") in Dresden (also known by its Latin name, schola crucis) is the oldest surviving school in Dresden and one of the oldest in Germany. As early as 1300, a schoolmaster (Cunradus puerorum rector) was mentioned. It was founded as a grammar school for the singers of the capella sanctae crucis (Latin for "Chapel of the Holy Cross"), now the Dresdner Kreuzchor. The school is now a Protestant Gymnasium, officially called the Evangelisches Kreuzgymnasium.

== History ==
Since its inception, the school has had close ties to the Kreuzkirche (Church of the Cross), formerly known as St. Nicholas Church, that dates at least to 1215. In the Middle Ages, to teach the children in church choirs, church schools proliferated. Schoolmasters were educators (particularly of theology), as well as music teachers. The school was first mentioned in a document of 6 April 1300.

In 1388, the church was reconsecrated as ecclesia sanctae crucis (Holy Cross Church) in recognition of its Reliquary, holding what was believed to be a piece of the True Cross. The first school building was erected adjacent to the church in 1393. The school followed the curriculum typical of medieval Latin schools, providing the choir boys preparation for university, as well as providing instruction about the natural world.

The school converted to Protestantism after the Lutheran reformation of the 16th century. For the next few centuries, the school underwent a slow decline, which, however, was reversed at the beginning of 19th century, with more than 400 students enrolled by the late 1820s. Richard Wagner was a pupil of the school for 5 years from the age of 9 to 14, enrolling in 1821.

In 1866, a more spacious building was constructed at the Georgplatz, close to the Kreuzkirche. It was the first major building in the city to be built in Neogothic style, built after a controversy. This building burned down during the 1945 air raids on Dresden; it was demolished in 1950. The school was at this period moved to the building of the former Masonic Institute, in the Striesen district of Dresden.

From 2007 to 2009, the building underwent a complete renovation; during that period, the school operated temporarily from the former Erich Wustmann High School in Dresden-Prohlis. Bishop Jochen Bohl officiated at the rededication of the new premises on 10 August 2009. At that time, 850 students were enrolled in the school, 145 of them singers of the Dresdner Kreuzchor.

== Notable students and other alumni ==
- Theo Adam
- Ludwig Blochberger
- Walter von Boetticher
- Heinrich Braun
- Gustav Fechner
- Carl Heinrich Graun
- Johann Gottlieb Graun
- Walther Hesse
- Johann Adam Hiller
- Richard Klemm
- Hermann Köchly
- Theodor Körner
- Asteris Koutoulas
- Hermann Kretzschmar
- Johann Kuhnau
- Johann Gottlieb Lindner (as a junior teacher)
- Karl G. Maeser
- Philipp Mainländer
- Johann Gottlieb Naumann
- Hans Oster
- René Pape
- Egon Petri
- Eckart Preu
- Heinrich Pudor
- Hans-Christoph Rademann
- Karl Richter
- Arthur Schlossmann
- Ludwig Schnorr von Carolsfeld
- Peter Schreier
- Ingo Schulze
- Carl David Stegmann
- Hans Thamm
- Daniel Gottlob Türk
- Wolfgang Unger
- Richard Wagner
- Christian Ehregott Weinlig
- Friedrich Weleminsky
- Alexander Witting
- Gustav Wustmann
- Udo Zimmermann

== Literature ==
- Blaschke, Karlheinz (1991). Dresden : Kreuzkirche, Kreuzschule, Kreuzchor : musikalische und humanistische Tradition in 775 Jahren (in German). Gütersloh/München: Bertelsmann Lexikon Verlag. ISBN 3-570-06680-0. OCLC 27635988.
