= Gustav Wustmann =

German philologist and historian (1844–1910)

Gustav Wustmann (23 May 1844 – 22 December 1910) was a German philologist and historian, born in Dresden, where he frequented the Kreuzschule, before studying philology at Leipzig in 1862–1866. He then taught at the Old St Nicholas School (Nikolaischule) in Leipzig until 1881, when appointed director of the municipal archives and city librarian. From 1879 he was also associate editor of the Grenzboten and in 1897 received the title of professor. He faced much opposition by his publication Allerhand Sprachdummheiten, Kleine deutsche Grammatik des Zweifelhaften, des Falschen und des Häßlichen (1891; fourth edition, 1908). Besides a collection of poems, entitled Als der Großvater die Großmutter nahm (1886; fourth edition, 1905), he edited a new adaptation of Wilhelm Borchardt's Die sprichwörtlichen Redensarten im deutschen Volksmund nach Sinn und Ursprung erläutert (fifth edition, 1895).

== Bibliography ==
- Apelles’ Leben und Werke (1870)
- Der Leipziger Baumeister Hieronymus Lotter (1875)
- Beiträge zur Geschichte der Malerei in Leipzig vom 15. bis 17. Jahrhundert (1879)
- Aus Leipzigs Vergangenheit (1885)
- Quellen zur Geschichte Leipzigs (1889–1895)
- Leipzig durch drei Jahrhunderte (1890)
- Allerhand Sprachdummheiten (1891)
- Der Wirt von Auerbachs Keller, Dr. Heinrich Stromer von Auerbach (1902)
