= Heinrich Braun =

German surgeon

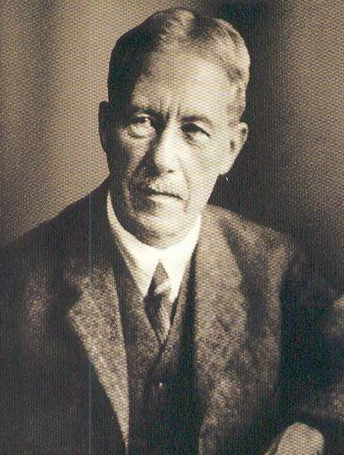
Heinrich Braun

Heinrich Friedrich Wilhelm Braun (1 January 1862 – 26 April 1934) was a German surgeon remembered for his work in the field of anaesthesiology. He was a native of Rawitsch, Province of Posen (today called Rawicz, Poland).

Braun attended the Kreuzschule and the Vitzhumsches Gymnasium in Dresden, completing his Abitur in 1881. He studied medicine at the Universities of Strasbourg, Greifswald and Leipzig, earning his doctorate in 1887. From 1891 to 1905 he worked at various hospitals in Leipzig, becoming an associate professor at the University of Leipzig in 1905. The following year he was appointed chief surgeon and medical director of the Royal Saxonian Hospital in Zwickau, a position he maintained until his retirement in 1923. Construction of the "Krankenstift Zwickau" in 1921 was based on his plans and recommendations.

Braun made important contributions in the development of general, local and regional anaesthesia. In 1901 he devised an apparatus for mixed-gas anaesthesia, and in 1903 recommended the addition of adrenaline as a vasoconstrictor to local anaesthetics. In 1905 he introduced procaine into clinical medicine, an anaesthetic that had previously been synthesized by Alfred Einhorn (1856-1917). Braun wrote Local Anesthesia, Its Scientific Basis and Practical Use.

== Associated eponym ==
- "Braun's splint": A metal splint and frame attached to pulleys, used to support a fractured leg while a patient is bedridden.
