= Liebfrauenkirche, Arnstadt =

Liebfrauenkirche
- Church of Our Lady
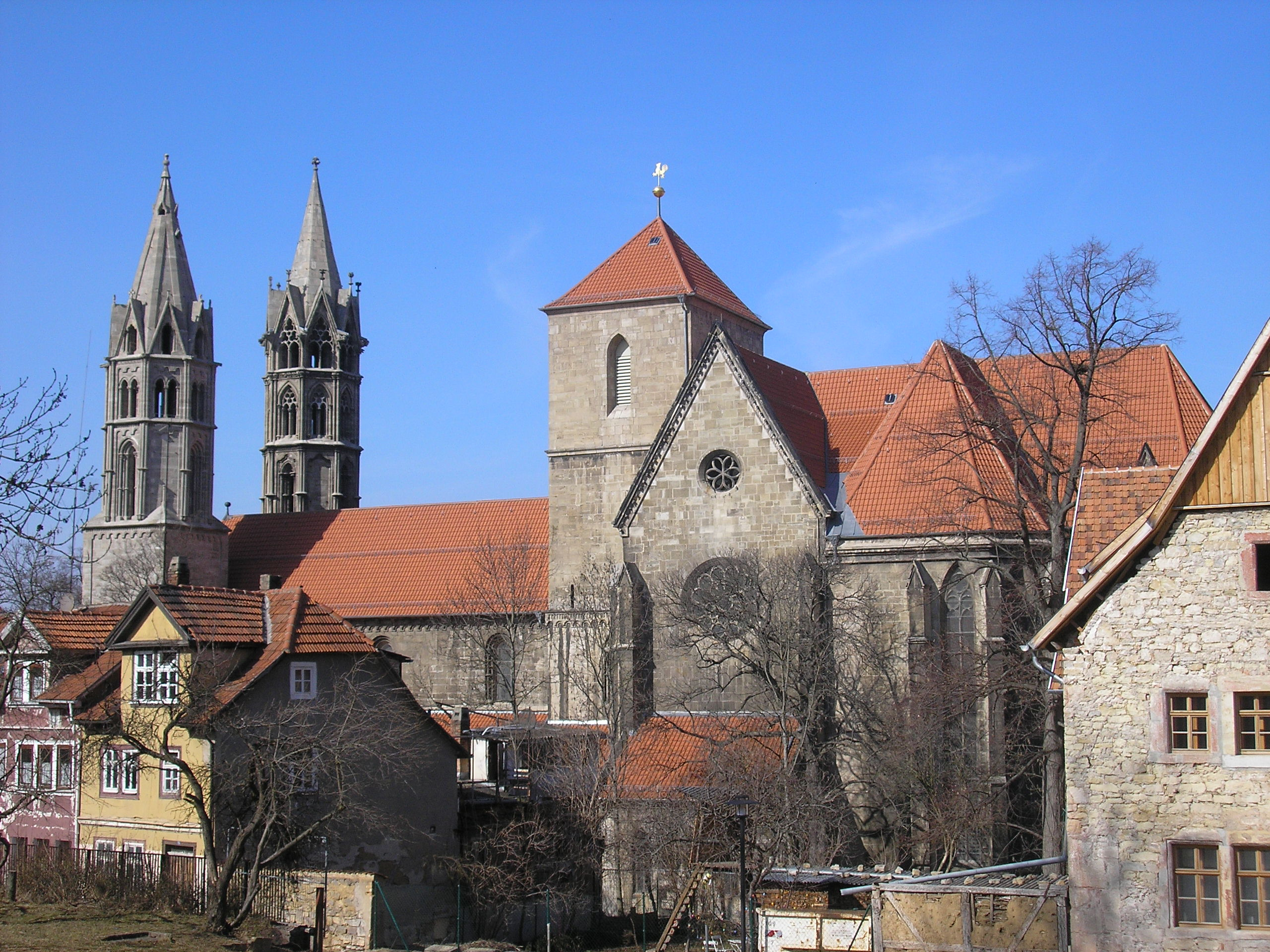
- The Liebfrauenkirche from south

- 50°50′00″N 10°56′30″E
- Location: Arnstadt, Thuringia
- Country: Germany
- Denomination: Lutheran
- Previous denomination: Roman Catholic

History
- Status: Parish church
- Founded: Middle Ages
- Dedication: Mary, mother of Jesus

Architecture
- Functional status: Active
- Architectural type: Basilica, three-aisled
- Style: Romanesque, Gothic
- Years built: 12th and 13th centuries

The Liebfrauenkirche (pronounced [liːpˈfʁaʊn̩ˌkɪʁçə], "Church of Our Lady") in the Thuringian town of Arnstadt, Germany, is a Lutheran parish church. The basilica, which was essentially erected in the 12th and 13th centuries, is considered, along with Naumburg Cathedral (now in Saxony-Anhalt), to be the most important church building of the transitional phase from Romanesque to Gothic architecture in Thuringia.

== History ==
=== Construction phase ===
Historians assume that the site where the Liebfrauenkirche stands today corresponds to the location mentioned in the deed of gift from the Thuringian Duke Hedan II to the Anglo-Saxon Bishop Willibrord of Utrecht in 704, and that Arnstadt's first church also stood here. In 726, the bishop bequeathed his share ("Portio") of the "Villa" Arnstadt to the Abbey of Echternach in his will. In the 12th century at the latest, the imperial Hersfeld Abbey took over the landlordship on site and moved the Walpurgis nunnery to the Liebfrauenkirche around 1307. Remains of foundation walls of various predecessor buildings have been archaeologically proven.

The present church building is inconsistent and contains medieval components from different construction phases. It is assumed that the building was constructed in the last quarter of the 12th century. This includes the eastern central nave bay, above which the rectangular east tower rises today. The unusual position of the tower above a nave bay is striking, which is why it has been suspected that it could be a former choir tower, as occurs in the region.

Around 1200, the church was fundamentally renovated as a basilica with galleries. The "false galleries" above the side aisles bear witness to this. Alongside the much earlier ones in Gernrode and the slightly younger choir galleries of Magdeburg Cathedral, they are the only ones of their kind in Central Germany. The west rail belongs to this period as well.

In the second quarter of the 13th century, parts of the side aisles, the clerestory, the vaults of the central nave and the portals in the west and in the side aisles were built. Due to its characteristic building forms, this building phase is counted among the group of buildings that were created in stylistic dependence on the Cistercian monastery of Maulbronn and are often referred to in research as "Maulbronn School buildings". A designation which, as Ernst Badstübner writes, "is not entirely appropriate for the buildings in Thuringia", "because on the one hand the dependence on the Black Forest monastery is not a direct one, and on the other hand because far more elements than can be explained by an influence from Cistercian architecture determine their character." The two polygonal decorative towers on the west rail, which statically did not harmonise optimally with the older substructure and are unsuitable to accommodate mighty bells, belong to this construction phase, too. Their stylistic similarity to the church buildings in Mühlhausen, especially those of St Mary's and Divi Blasii, was noticed early on. The stylistic development from the Late Romanesque south tower to the Gothic north tower in the middle of the 13th century can be seen in Arnstadt as a model for Thuringia.

In the last quarter of the 13th century, the Romanesque choir was replaced by the High Gothic east building consisting of a transept and a staggered hall. As early as the 19th century, the ground plan analogy with Regensburg Cathedral, whose foundation stone was laid in 1275, was noticed without research having a satisfactory explanation so far. Weber assumes that in Arnstadt, too, a basilical solution was initially aimed at. Probably under the impression of the hall buildings taking place in succession to St Elisabeth's Church in Marburg, there was also a change of plan in Arnstadt and the execution of the present hall building. Stylistic references also seem to exist to French Rayonnant buildings, such as the choir solution of the Church of Our Lady of Chambly or the tracery of Beauvais Cathedral. Since a gallery (which was removed again in the 19th century) was built in the southern part of the east building for the incorporated nunnery, it can be assumed that the interior work extended into the twenties of the 14th century. In 1333, the Liebfrauenkirche was designated as "Ecclesia parochialis" and thus as the main parish church of the town. In addition, the north choir accommodated the burial place and memoria of the Counts of Schwarzburg. The three-aisled structure of the choir building corresponded to the shared use of the space at that time.

=== The Liebfrauenkirche as a nunnery church ===
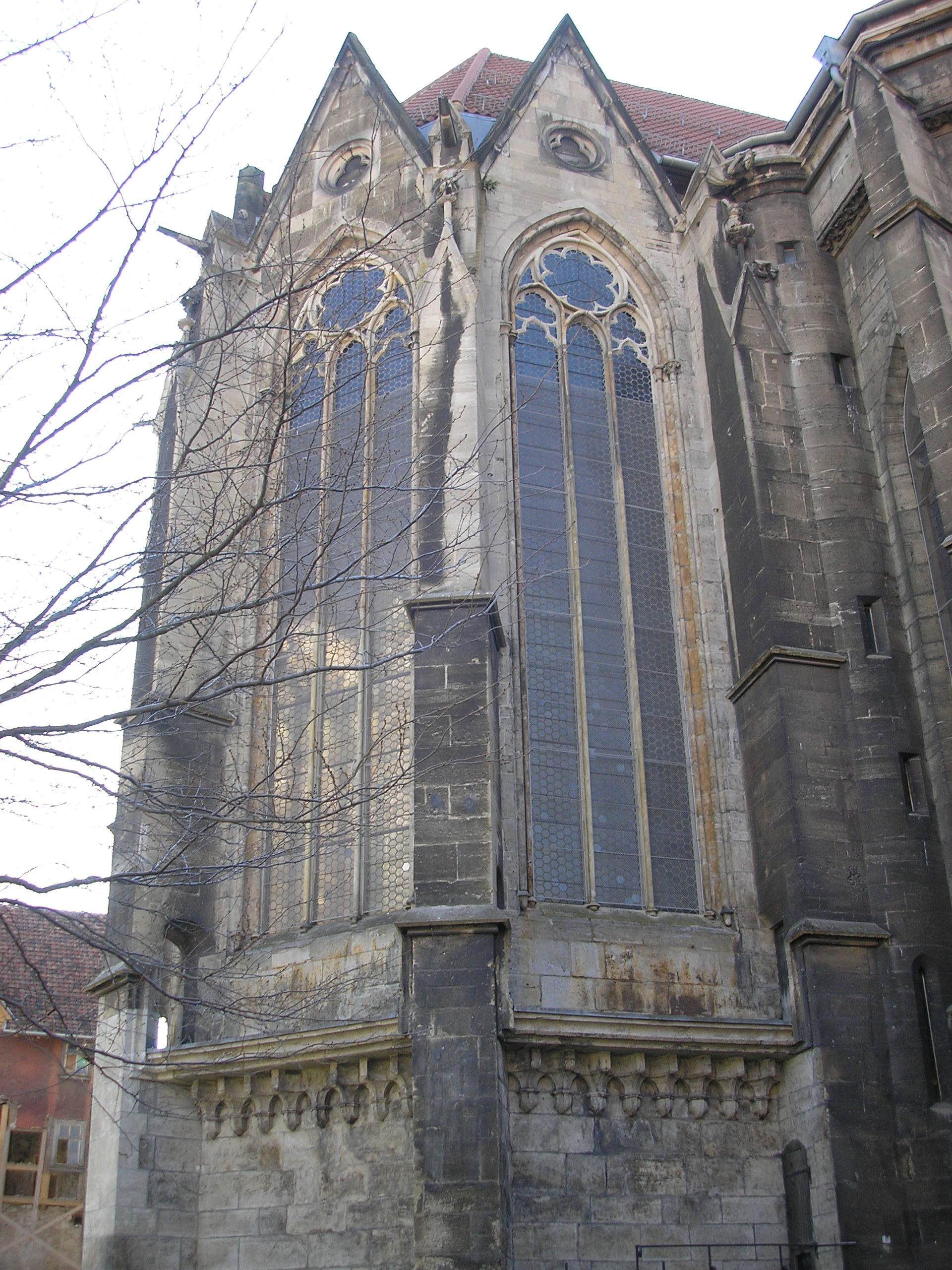
The east choir

With the relocation of the Benedictine convent of St Walpurgis, a nunnery owned by the imperial Abbey of Hersfeld, from Walpurgisberg (two kilometres (1.2 mi) south of Arnstadt) to the Liebfrauenkirche, the church acquired a significance that went beyond its function as a parish church. With the construction of a nun's gallery and the insertion of coloured windows, of which two apostle figures and a passion cycle can still be seen in the side aisles today, the construction of the church was completed for the time being in 1330.

Around 1475, construction work again took place in the monastery area. Mainly the burial chapel of the Schwarzburg counts was built. In addition, the bell tower was given a tile-covered spire in 1489. Following the Reformation, the Walpurgis convent was abandoned and the church lost its importance. It was little used; in 1660, the lord's seat was demolished and in 1813, the church was closed completely, now temporarily serving as a warehouse. This accelerated the decay that had already begun.

=== Restoration work in the 19th century ===
In 1789 and 1821, stabilisation work was carried out on the west towers, and in the 1830s on the interior of the church; among other things, pillars in the east building were renewed and the floor was newly laid, whereby old grave slabs disappeared and the rood screen was probably also demolished. After there had already been an appeal for donations for the preservation of the Liebfrauenkirche in 1842, which led to the renewal of the roofs in 1843, and an association for the recovery of the Liebfrauenkirche had been founded in 1855, extensive restoration work began in 1880. Under the direction of master builder Hubert Stier, the south wall of the transept was renewed, the choir windows were rebuilt with ornamental gables, the east central nave bay was vaulted and the bell tower was executed in neo-Gothic forms. On the west towers, the two stone spires and the free floors underneath were removed and rebuilt using acceptable old material. In the course of this construction work, the nuns' gallery was demolished in 1883. In addition, the aisles of the church were given a historicist interior painting.

=== Reconstruction in the 20th century and until today ===
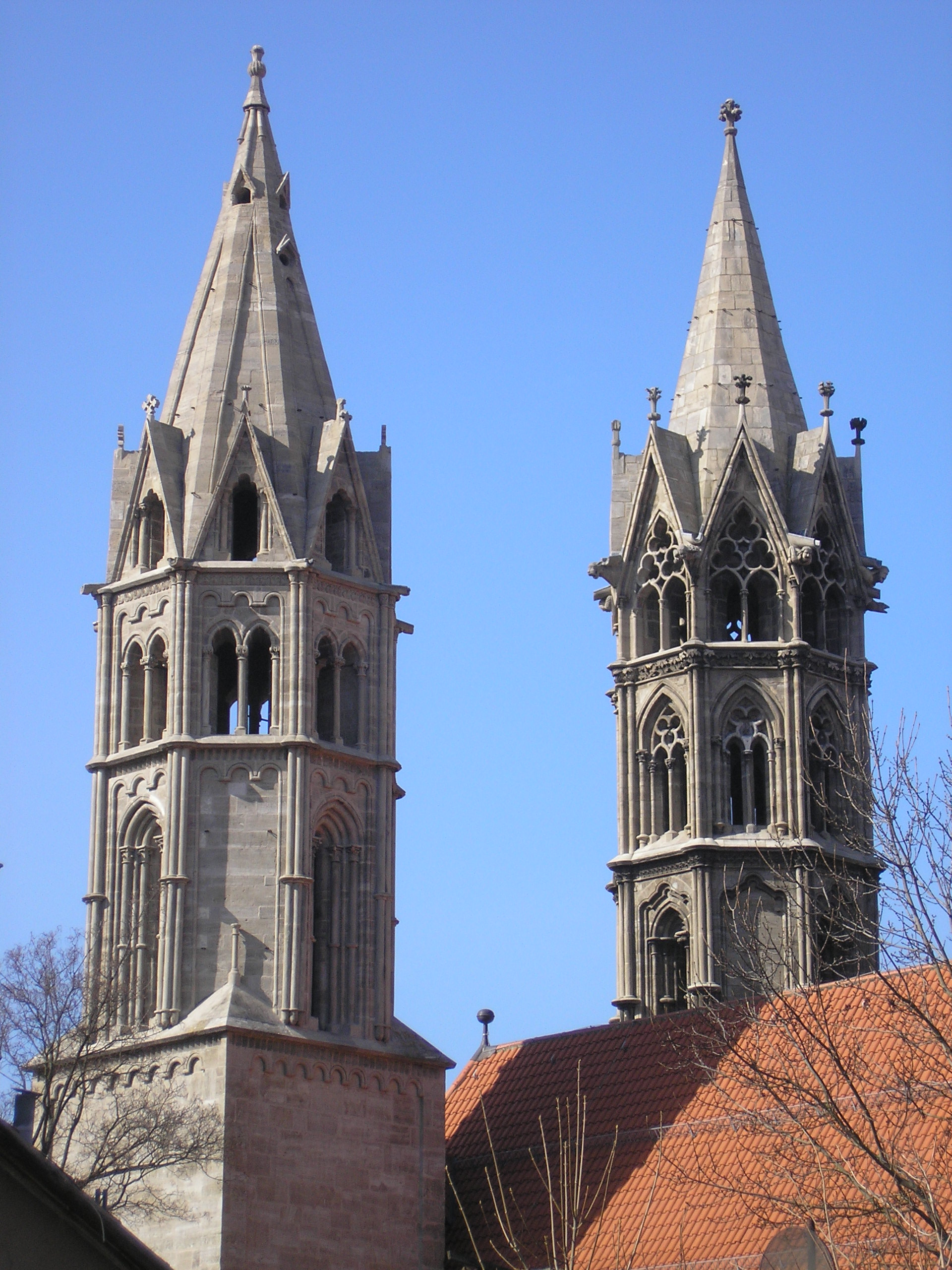
The west towers

In 1910, construction work began again with the aim of preserving and restoring as much of the original structure as possible. Under the direction of the civil officer Georg Wickop and the architect Martin Schwarz, a large part of the west structure, which was still unstable, was removed following the example of the Worms Cathedral restoration, and even the foundation of the north tower was renewed. The stone material was documented and, as far as possible, an exact reconstruction of the "old forms" was carried out using the old building material. The neo-Gothic west gable, however, was demolished, including the statue of the Virgin Mary. The roof was given the shape of a hip roof again. In addition, the historicist interior painting was removed.

In 1942, the bronze bells dating from 1585 were removed and melted down for war purposes. They were replaced by three chilled iron bells in 1959 as part of extensive reconstruction work begun in 1954. In April 1945, the church was damaged by American artillery fire. In the course of the reconstruction, the neo-Gothic tower from 1881 was reduced to its present form in 1958 to relieve the foundations, and in 1960 the coloured windows in the choir area were removed. After this reconstruction work was completed, the church was reconsecrated on 7 November 1973, Willibrord's Day. In 1978, the church was equipped with a new Schuke organ with 27 stops, two manuals and about 1900 pipes, which was installed in the transept for sound reasons, thus creating an unobstructed view of the west front. It sounded in public for the first time on 13 June 1979.

Partial renovation of the roof was carried out from 1991 to 1994 and the north-west tower was repaired in 1996. Despite all the repair and reconstruction work that had been done, there was still an urgent need for renovation. The choir buttresses were in danger of collapsing and there was considerable structural damage to the other buttresses as well. Therefore, on 4 November 2000, the Board of Trustees for the Preservation of the Liebfrauenkirche was founded under the patronage of the Thuringian Minister of Culture, Dagmar Schipanski. As a result of the work of the Board of Trustees, the renovation of the choir buttresses as well as the securing of the other pillars could be completed by May 2001. At the end of 2001, the renovation of the roof began with a new covering and the repair of the ceiling plaster. On the occasion of the 1300th anniversary of the town of Arnstadt, a four-part peal of bronze bells was installed again in 2004.

== Interior ==
=== Works of art ===
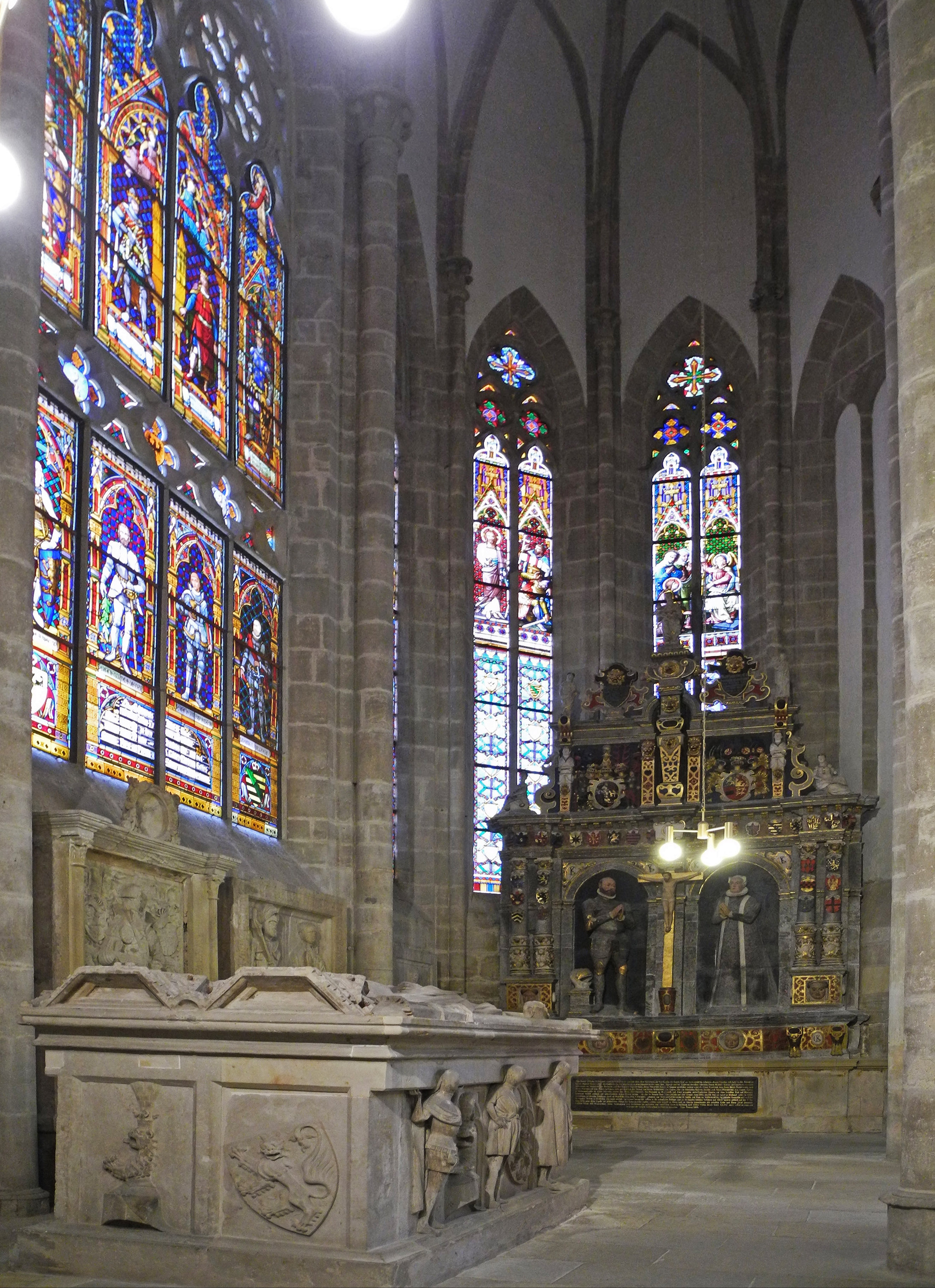
The northern side choir with tumba

The Liebfrauenkirche houses numerous works of art:

- Burial chapel of the counts of Schwarzburg-Arnstadt in the northern side choir with:
  - Tumba of Count Günther XXV of Schwarzburg-Blankenburg (born c. 1331; died 1368) and his wife Elisabeth of Honstein-Sondershausen (born c. 1332; died 1380), from the Parler workshop (c. 1380)
  - Epitaph from 1590 for Günther XLI of Schwarzburg-Arnstadt (1529–1583) and his wife Katharina of Nassau-Dillenburg (1543–1624)
  - Gravestones for Günther the Bremer (died 1531), his son Heinrich XXXII (died 1538) and Günther XL (died 1552) and his wife Elisabeth, Countess of Eisenberg (died 1593) on the northern wall
- Winged altar by Jacob Naumann (1498): Coronation of the Virgin Mary with St Lawrence and St Boniface, originally in the Oberkirche
- Arnstadt's "Beautiful Madonna" carved from lime wood (c. 1415–1420)
- Baptismal font and pulpit, supported by Moses, pointing to the 10 Commandments
- Painting of St Peter and Paul
- Aureola Madonna as stone relief
- One of the heaviest bells in the Thuringian regional church, weighing 4,389 kilograms (4.320 LT), dating from 1585, cast in the Erfurt bell foundry of Melchior Möhrinck
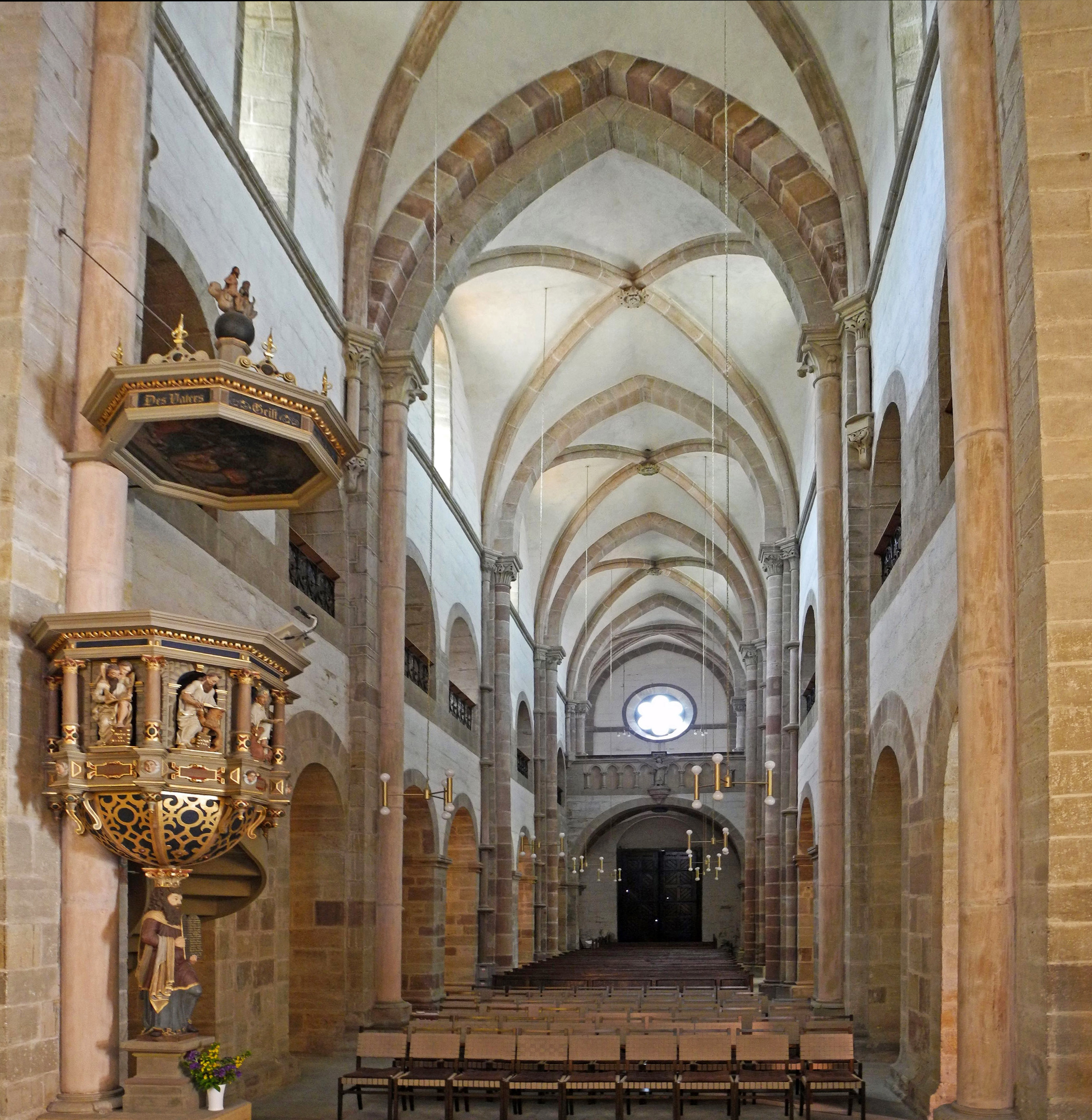
Interior view

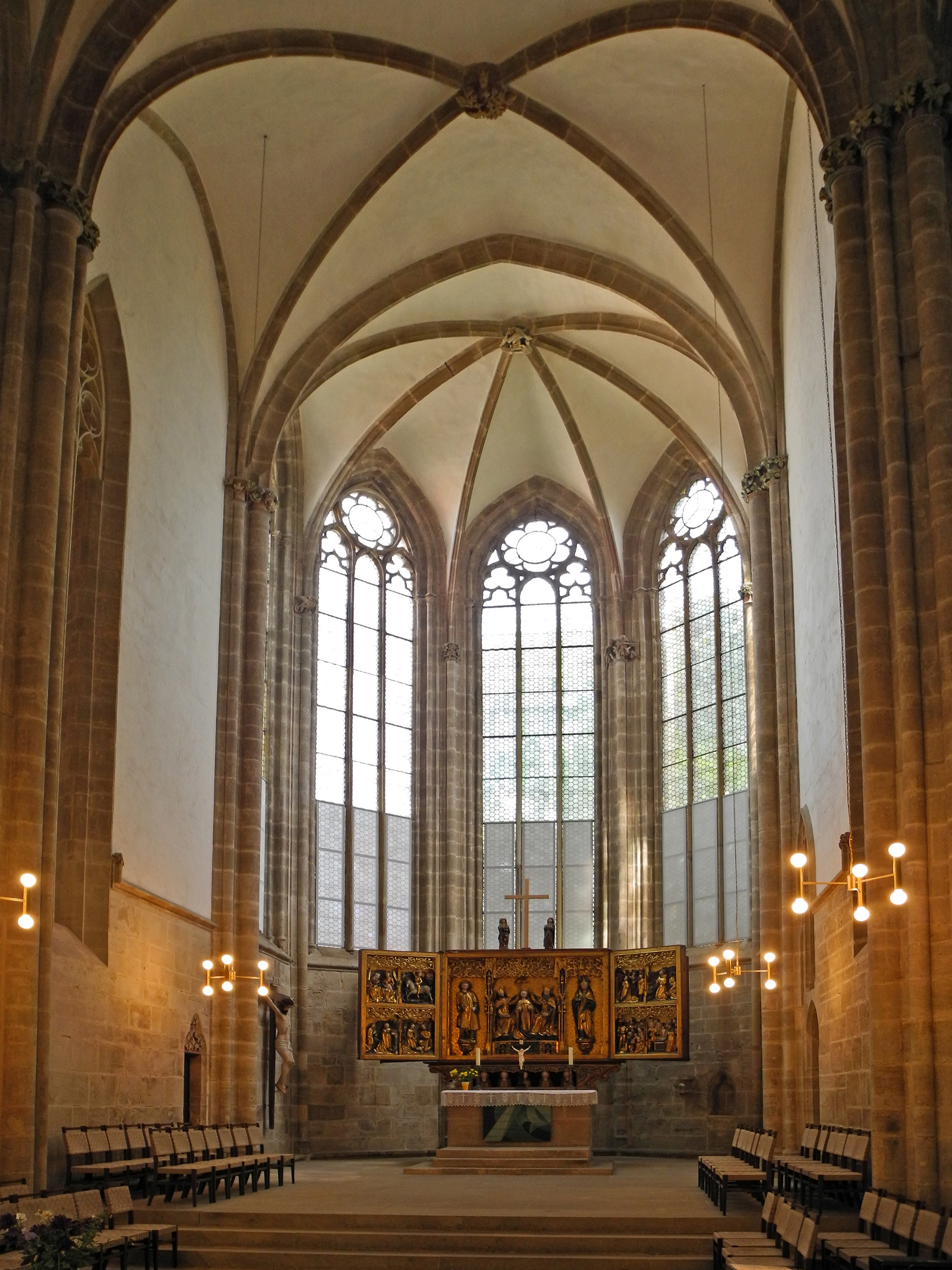
The choir

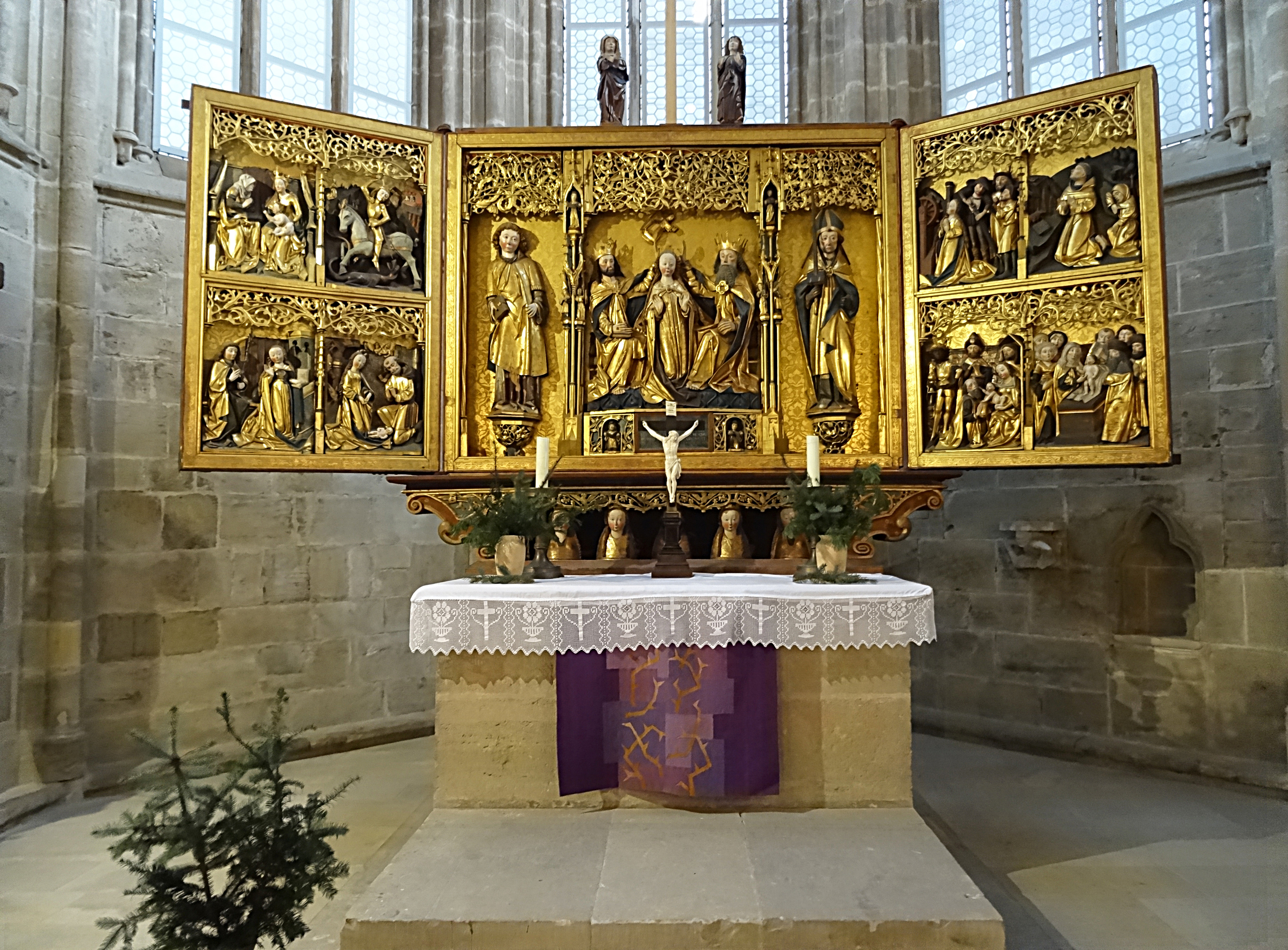
The winged altar (1498)

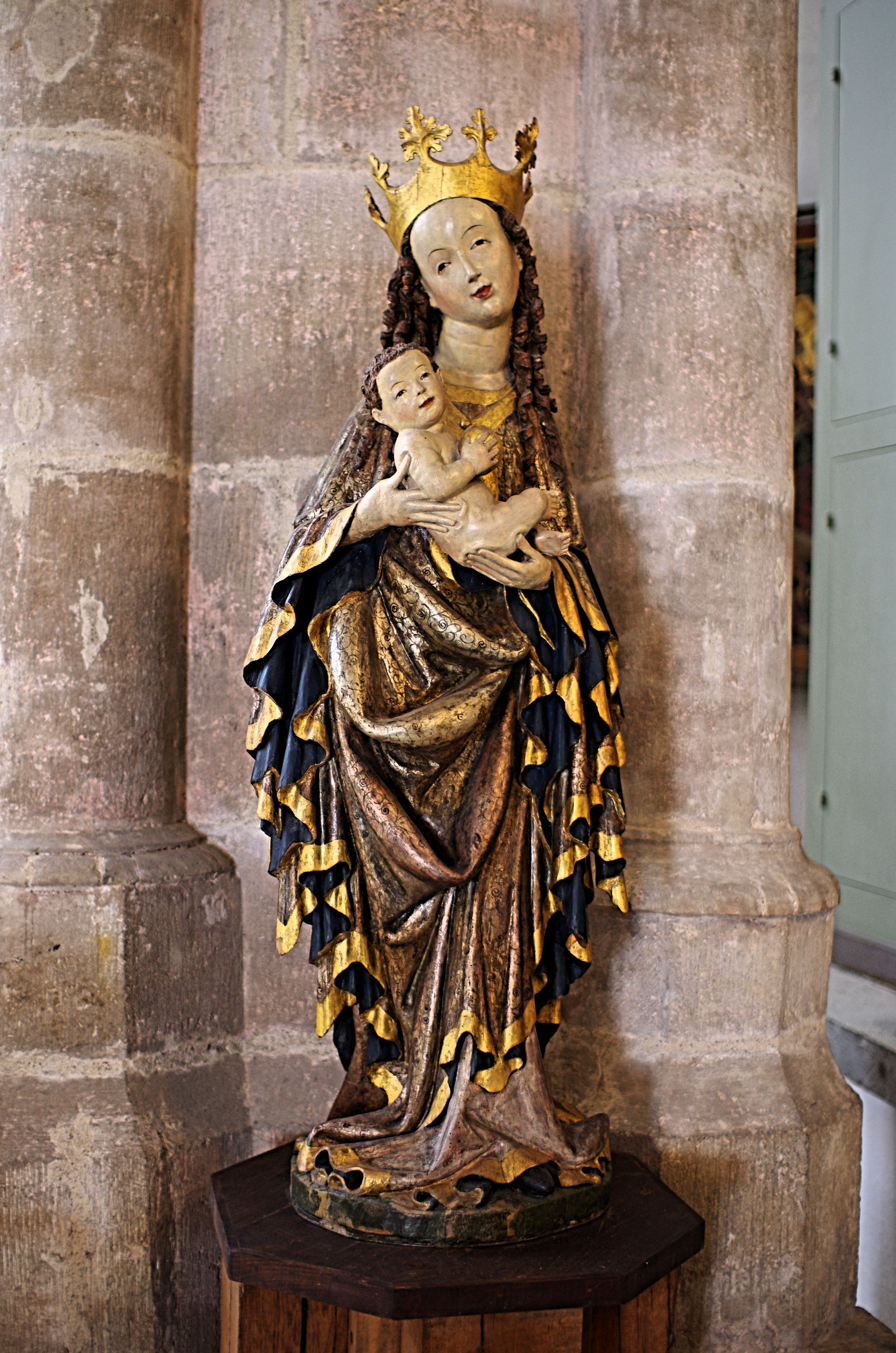
The "Beautiful Madonna" (c. 1415–1420)

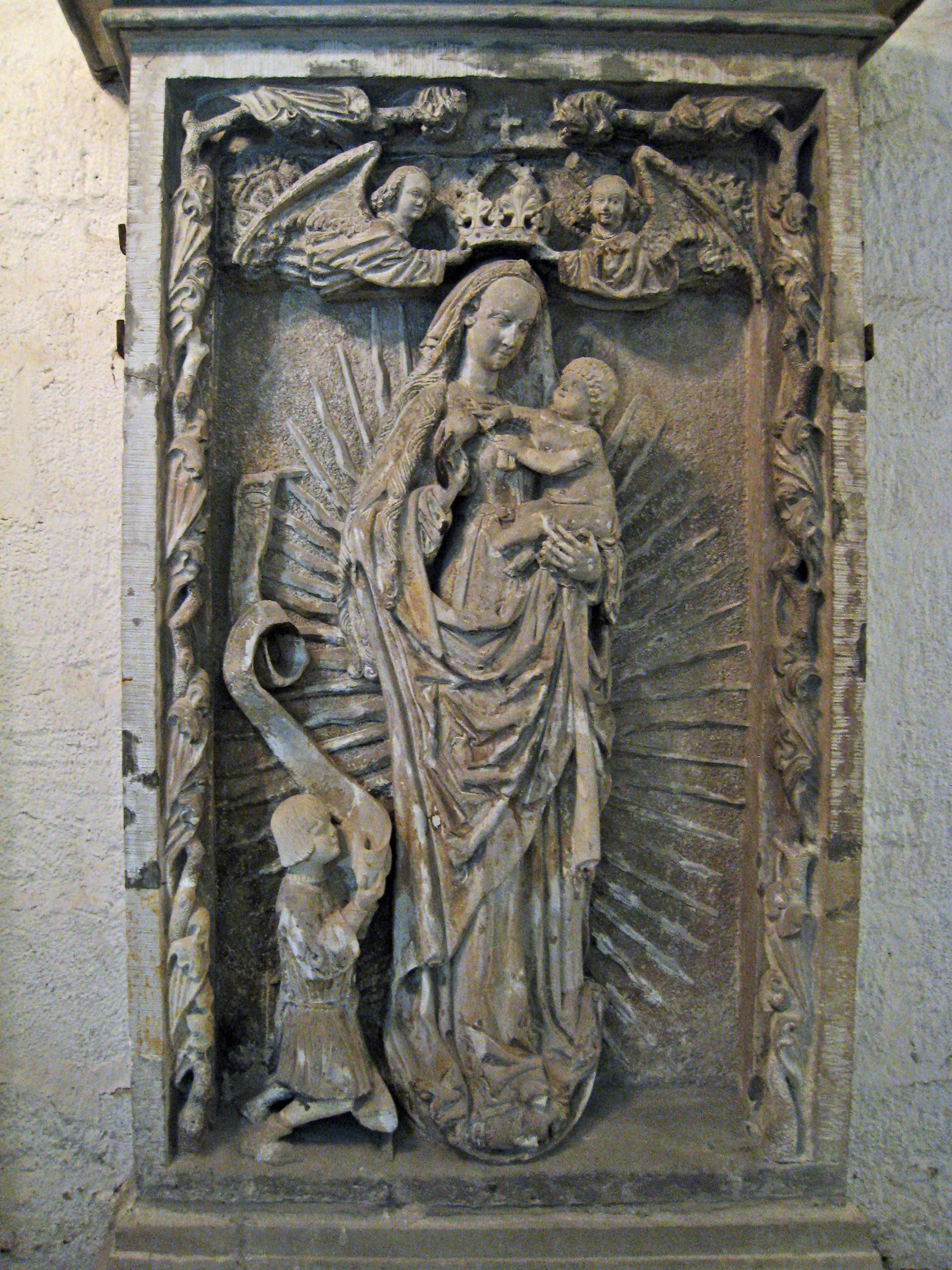
The Aureola Madonna

=== Organ ===
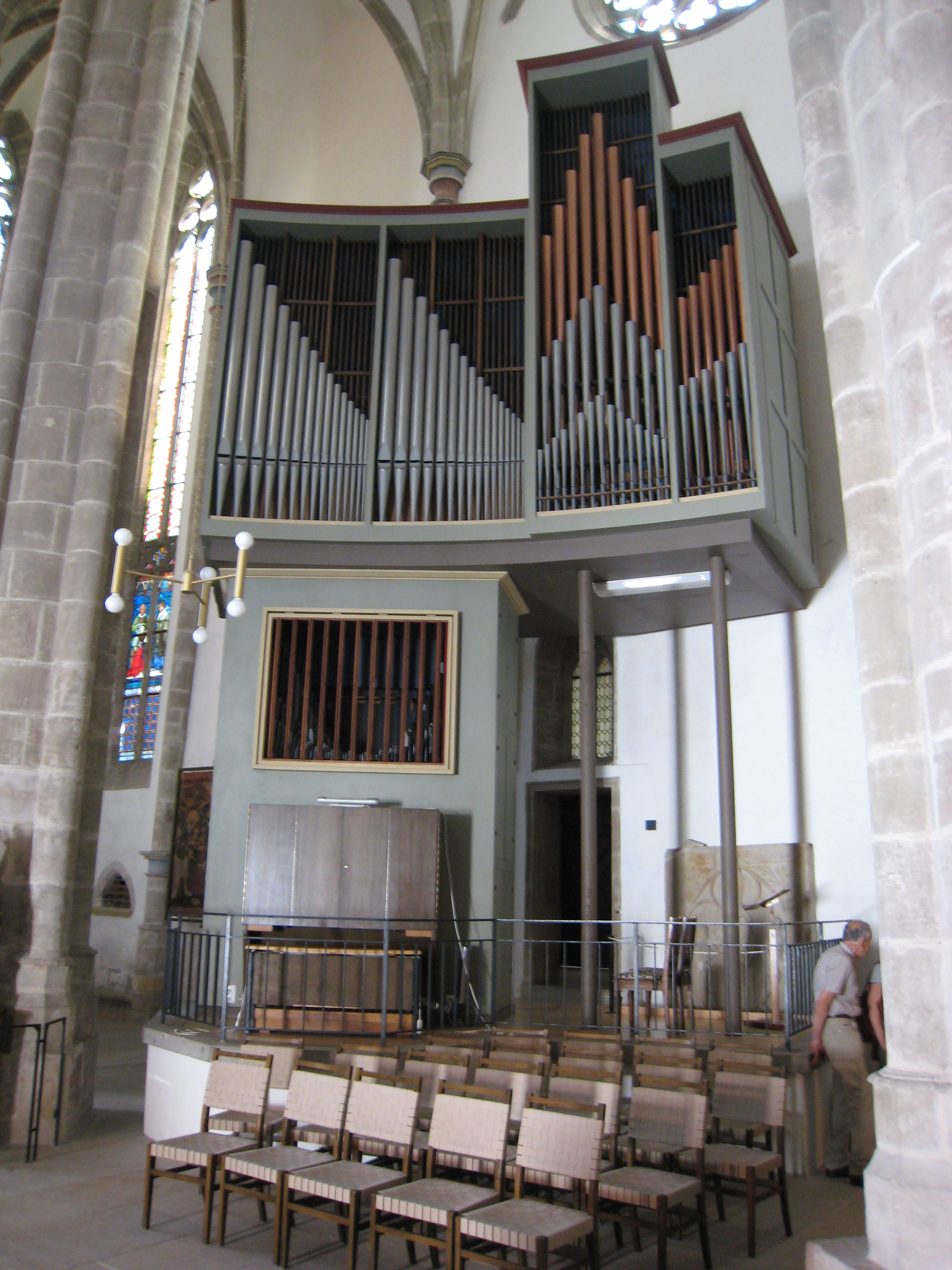
The Schuke organ

The organ was built in 1979 by Schuke from Potsdam (opus 488). The slider chest instrument has 27 stops on two manuals and pedal. The key and stop action are mechanical.

I Main division C–g^{3}
1.	Bordun	16′
2.	Prinzipal	8′
3.	Rohrflöte	8′
4.	Oktave	4′
5.	Spitzflöte	4′
7.	Nasat	2 2/3′
6.	Oktave	2′
8.	Mixtur V
9.	Trompete	8′

II Swell positive C–g^{3}
10.	Gedackt	8′
11.	Quintadena	8′
12.	Prinzipal	4′
13.	Rohrflöte	4′
14.	Gemshorn	2′
15.	Quinte	1 1/3′
16.	Sesquialtera II
17.	Scharff IV
18.	Krummhorn	8′
	Tremulant

Pedal C–f^{1}
19.	Subbass	16′
20.	Oktave	8′
21.	Gedacktbass	8′
22.	Choralbass	4′
23.	Nachthorn	2′
24.	Bassaliquote III
25.	Mixtur V
26.	Posaune	16′
27.	Trompete	8′

Couplers: II/I, I/P, II/P

=== Bells ===
The Liebfrauenkirche has a four-part bell ringing, which hangs in a wooden belfry in the east tower above the crossing. The largest bell was cast by Melchior Möringk in 1585. The other three bronze bells were cast in 2003 at the Bachert bell foundry in Heilbronn. They replaced three iron bells that had been purchased after the Second World War to replace historical bells by the caster Möringk that had been confiscated during the war.

No.	Diameter	Mass	Strike tone (Note + 1/16)
1	1,828 mm (6 ft 0 in)	4,389 kg (4.320 LT)	b^{0} + 4
2	1,382 mm (4 ft 6.4 in)	2,045 kg (2.013 LT)	e^{1} + 6
3	1,225 mm (4 ft 0.2 in)	1,435 kg (1.412 LT)	f♯^{1} + 8
4	1,091 mm (3 ft 7.0 in)	980 kg (0.96 LT)	g♯^{1} + 6

== Bibliography ==
- Weber, Klaus T. (2008). Transformation – die Liebfrauenkirche in Arnstadt (in German). Regensburg: Schnell & Steiner. pp. 127–154. ISBN 978-3-7954-2065-9.
- Orban, Hans-Ulrich (2008). Liebfrauenkirche Arnstadt. Kleine Kunstführer (in German) (4th ed.). Regensburg: Schnell & Steiner. ISBN 978-3-7954-5724-2.
