= Arnstadt =

- Town
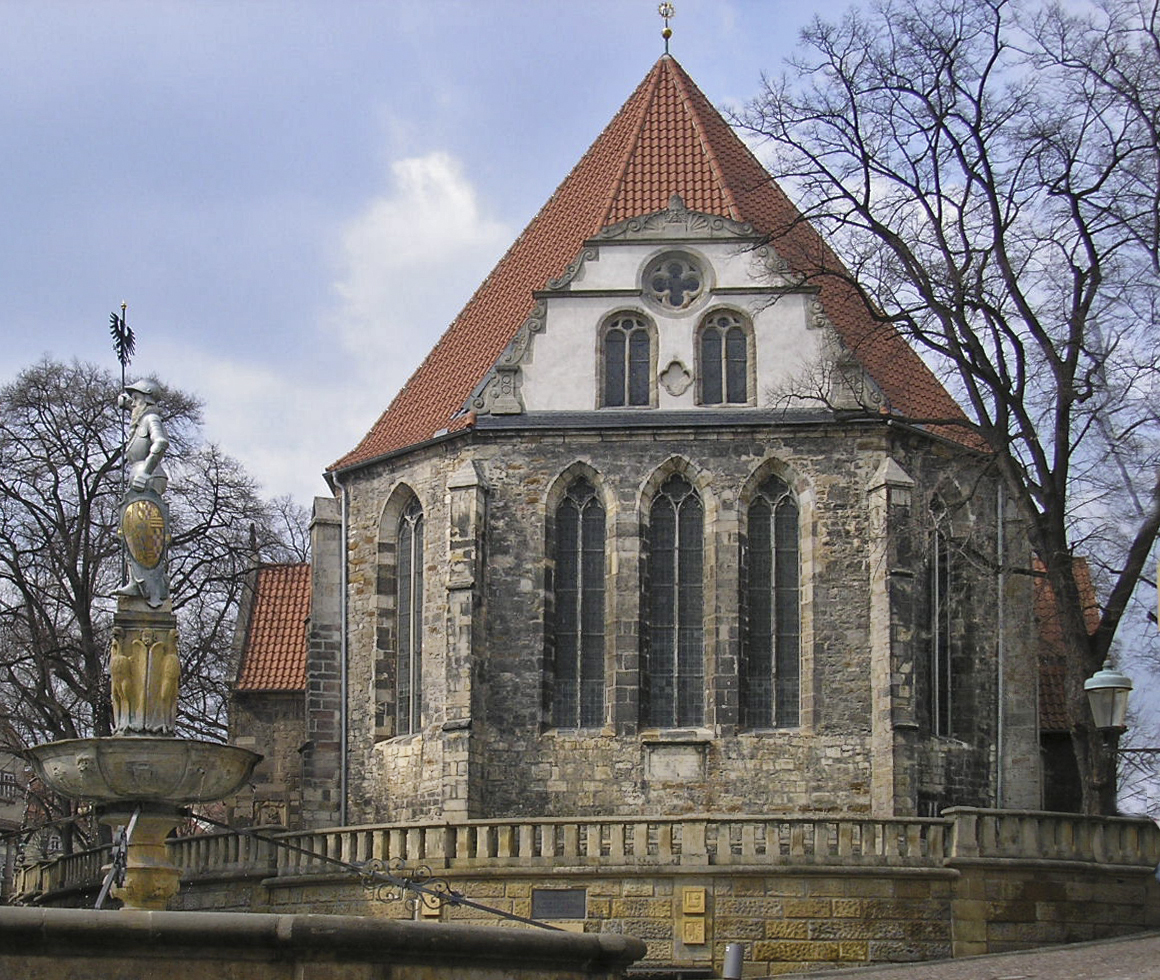
- The Bach Church

- Flag Coat of arms

- Location of Arnstadt within Ilm-Kreis district
- Interactive map of Arnstadt
- Location within Germany Location within Thuringia
- Coordinates: 50°50′3″N 10°56′47″E
- Country: Germany
- State: Thuringia
- District: Ilm-Kreis
- Subdivisions: core town + 17 villages

Government
  - Mayor (2024–30): Frank Spilling

Area
  - Total: 104.99 km^{2} (40.54 sq mi)
- Elevation: 288 m (945 ft)

Population (2025-12-31)
  - Total: 28,615
  - Density: 272.55/km^{2} (705.90/sq mi)
- Time zone: UTC+01:00 (CET)
  - Summer (DST): UTC+02:00 (CEST)
- Postal codes: 99301–99310
- Dialling codes: 03628
- Vehicle registration: IK, ARN, IL
- Website: www.arnstadt.de

Arnstadt (German pronunciation: [ˈaʁnˌʃtat]) is a town in Ilm-Kreis, Thuringia, Germany, on the river Gera about 20 kilometres (12 mi) south of Erfurt, the capital of Thuringia. Arnstadt is one of the oldest towns in Thuringia, and has a well-preserved historic centre with a partially preserved town wall. The town is nicknamed Das Tor zum Thüringer Wald ("The Gateway to the Thuringian Forest") because of its location on the northern edge of that forest. Arnstadt has a population of approximately 27,000.

== Geography ==
The town centre is on the west side of the River Gera. The municipality has absorbed several neighbouring municipalities: Angelhausen–Oberndorf (1922), Siegelbach (1994), Rudisleben (1999) and Wipfratal (2019). The neighbouring municipalities are Amt Wachsenburg, Alkersleben, Dornheim, Bösleben-Wüllersleben, Stadtilm, Ilmenau, Plaue and Geratal.

=== Climate ===
The annual precipitation averages 487 mm.

== History ==
A deed of gift issued 1 May 704 in Würzburg by the Thuringian Duke Hedan II to the Anglo-Saxon bishop Willibrord of Utrecht is the first written reference to Arnstadt ("Arnestati"), along with two other towns—the oldest documented reference of settlements in Thuringia and central and eastern Germany. In 726, Arnstadt passed to the Abbey of Echternach, and later to the Abbey of Hersfeld. According to historian August Beck, in 925 the territories of Henry I were extended as a bulwark against the invading Magyars. On 17 December 954, Holy Roman Emperor Otto I made peace in Arnstadt with his rebellious son Liudolf of Swabia and another son, William, whom he appointed Archbishop of Mainz, and decided that the Liebfrauenkirche (Church of Our Lady) would be built.

In the 12th century a part of Arnstadt fell under the rule of the Counts of Kevernburg. On 8 March 1198 the princes of the Holy Roman Empire gathered in Arnstadt and elected Philip of Swabia as King of Germany. In 1220 Arnstadt was first described as a civitas, that is a city. On 21 April 1266, the abbot of the Abbey of Hersfeld granted a charter; thereafter, Arnstadt became a hub for trade in timber, grain, wine and wood.

After the extinction of the Kevernburg family from 1302 to 1306, the counts of Schwarzburg took possession of Arnstadt. Attempts by Erfurt in 1342 and 1345 to seize what was now a wealthy town failed due to its strong fortifications. Arnstadt's prosperity was based on the milling industry, the cloth-making trade, tanneries, and trade in wine, woad, wood, grain, wool, and vegetables.

On 30 January 1349, Count Günther XXI of Schwarzburg, an adversary of King Charles IV, was elected and crowned sovereign of Arnstadt in Frankfurt. He renounced this title on 26 May for 20,000 silver marks. A 1404 reference was found in 2000 to Bratwurst originating in Arnstadt; therefore, the town claims its invention. In 1496, the Schwarzburg domains were divided into the lordships of Schwarzburg-Rudolstadt and Schwarzburg-Sondershausen, to which Arnstadt belonged. During the German Peasants' War 95 participants in the uprising were beheaded as ringleaders in the Arnstadt marketplace, on 17 June and 2 August 1525. The city was forced to pay 3000 guilders for supporting the insurgents. In 1531 the Reformation was introduced into Arnstadt. As a result, the Franciscan maidens' convent, and subsequently the Franciscan mendicant convent (Barfüßerkloster) were secularized. From 1581, the church of the former Franciscan monastery (now the Oberkirche, "Upper Church") was the main church of the city. In 1553, work began on the count's residence, Neideck Castle. The water palace was completed in 1560.

With the onset of industrialisation, a residential area emerged to the west and south of the old town, and industrial areas to the north. During the Second World War, it was the site of a prisoner-of-war camp, mainly for Poles and Russians. 1,700 prisoners were housed in tents that contained only 100 bunks. The camp was liberated by American Forces in April 1945. A number of mass graves were discovered. 1,200 civilians from the neighbouring city of Weimar were brought on a forced tour of the camp. This included a "parchment display" which displayed a "lampshade made of human skin." The display also included pieces of skin used for painting pictures. After the Second World War, the town expanded further to the north along the Geratals, new residential areas emerged in the 1970s and 80s, in the east and southeast of Arnstadt, including the residential Raven Hold. Arnstadt is a manufacturing centre with glassworks and foundries, a solar panel production plant, and glove-manufacturing and wood-finishing businesses.

== Main sights ==
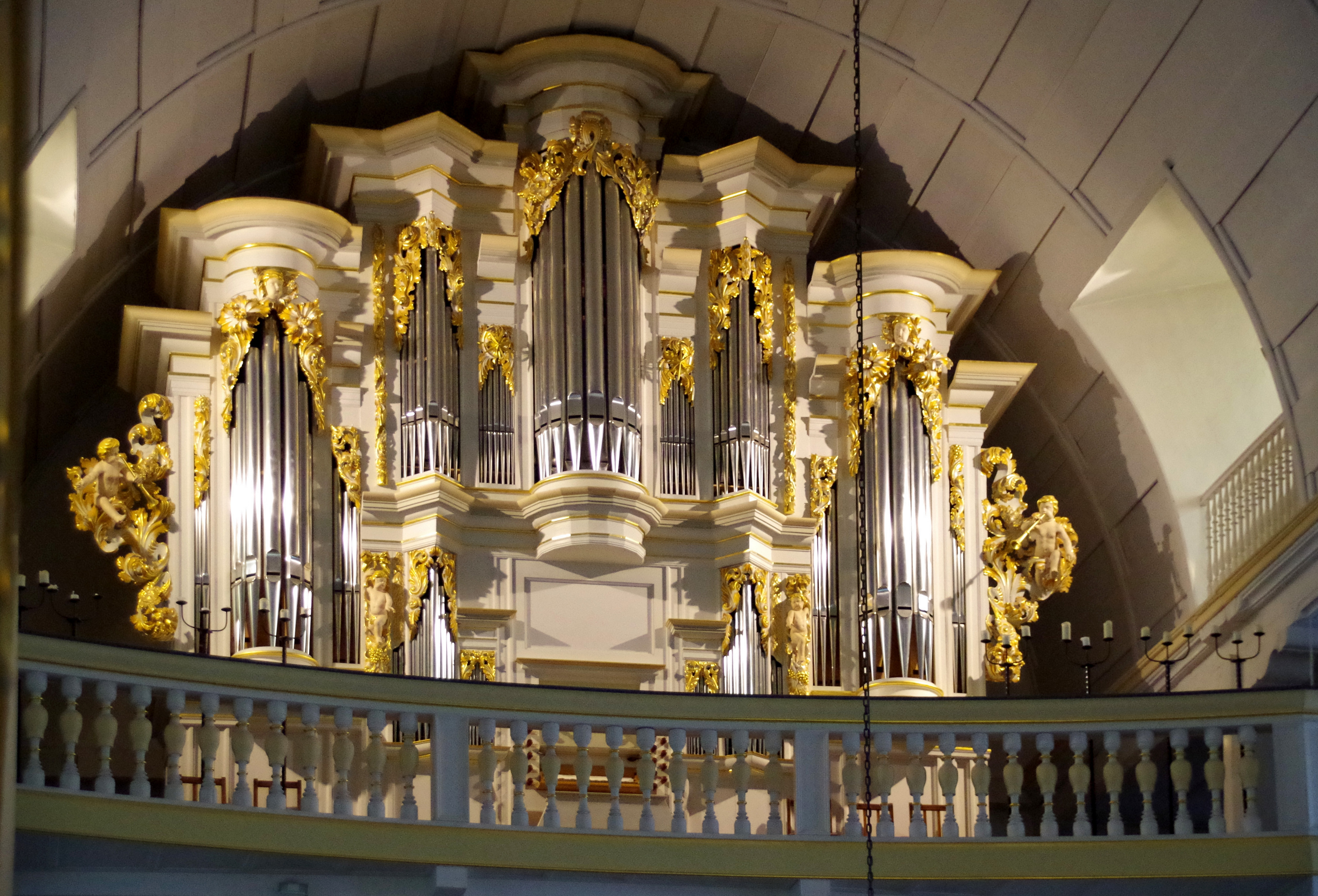
The restored Wender organ in the Bach Church

Arnstadt has a well kept old town, restricted to pedestrian traffic. Some of its noteworthy buildings include:

- the 13th-century Romanesque-Gothic Liebfrauenkirche (Church of Our Lady)
- an 18th-century palace
- the Bach Church (formerly the New Church)
- the former Franciscan church Oberkirche ("Upper Church")

In 1703, at the age of eighteen, the composer Johann Sebastian Bach was appointed as organist at the New Church. The family lived for generations in the vicinity of Arnstadt and this was his first post. Newly constructed by the master organ builder Johann Friedrich Wender, the organ was inaugurated by Bach in a Sunday recital for the feast of St John the Baptist. Bach was fortunate to be able to play on such a modern and fully operational instrument: it had well-tempered tuning, permitted diverse harmonic effects, and did not require constant repair. His period in Arnstadt ended in 1707, but already by then Bach had acquired an almost complete mastery of organ and keyboard technique, that would remain with him throughout his life. His organ works ranged from large-scale chorales to more diverse pieces, such as fugues, preludes, fantasias, toccatas, passacaglias, sonatas and concertos. He also drew inspiration from his contemporaries, as well as the Italian, German and French masterworks of the sixteenth and seventeenth century, such as the Fiori Musicali of Girolamo Frescobaldi. As Wolff & Zepf (2012) point out, for the critical period between 1703 and 1707, Bach has ideal conditions "to strengthen and expand his virtuosity and, as a composer, build and develop his harmonic fantasy and tonal ideas".

== Sport ==
The town hosts an annual high jump meet – Hochsprung mit Musik – which attracts some of the world's foremost high jumpers. Kajsa Bergqvist set a world record in Arnstadt's Sporthalle am Jahn-sportpark in 2006.

== Twin towns – sister cities ==
Arnstadt is twinned with:

- Le Bouscat, France
- Dubí, Czech Republic
- Gurk, Austria
- Kassel, Germany

== Notable people ==
=== Sons and daughters of the town ===
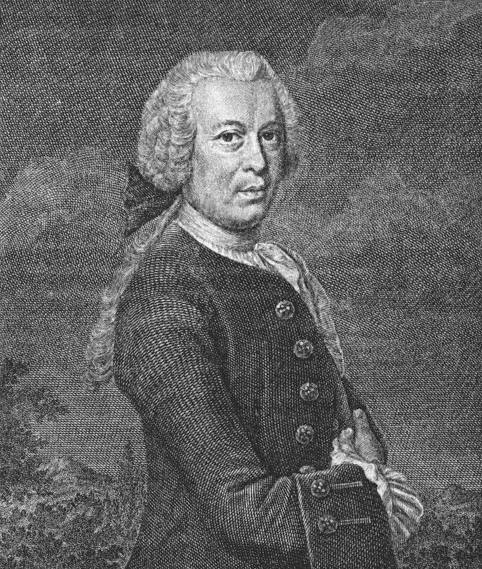
August Johann Rösel von Rosenhof

- Johann Christoph Bach (1642–1703), composer
- Johann Michael Bach (1648–1694), composer
- August Johann Rösel von Rosenhof (1705–1759), naturalist
- Johann Christian Gottlieb Ernesti (1756–1802), classical scholar
- Johann Christian von Hellbach (1757–1828), lawyer and writer
- Ernst August Nicolai (1800–1875), naturalist
- Friedrich Filitz (1804–1876), composer and musicologist
- E. Marlitt (1825–1887), writer
- Bernhard Stade (1848–1906), theologian
- Katrin Schreiter (born 1969), athlete
- Kornelia Greßler (born 1970), swimmer
- Sandra Wallenhorst (born 1972), triathlete and duathlete
- Thomas Ziegler (born 1980), cyclist
- Theresa Senff (born 1982), cyclist
- Marcel Kittel (born 1988), cyclist

=== Associated with the town ===
- Johann Friedrich Wender (1655–1729), organ builder, worked here
- Johann Sebastian Bach (1685–1750), composer and musician, worked here
- Willibald Alexis (1798–1871), historical novelist, lived and died here
- Ludwig Bechstein (1801–1860), writer, studied here in 1818–1821

== Gallery ==
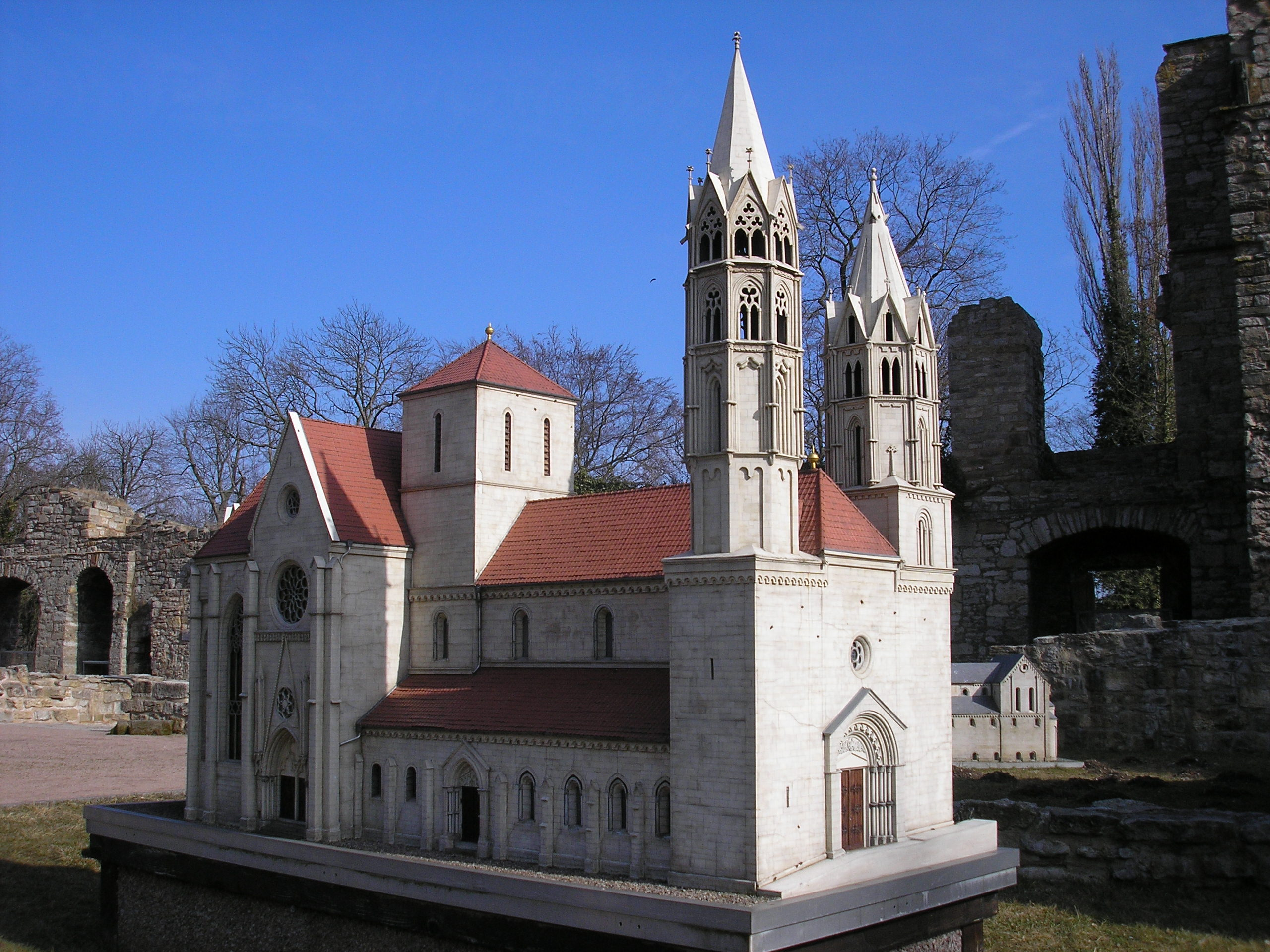
Architectural model of the Liebfrauenkirche in Arnstadt

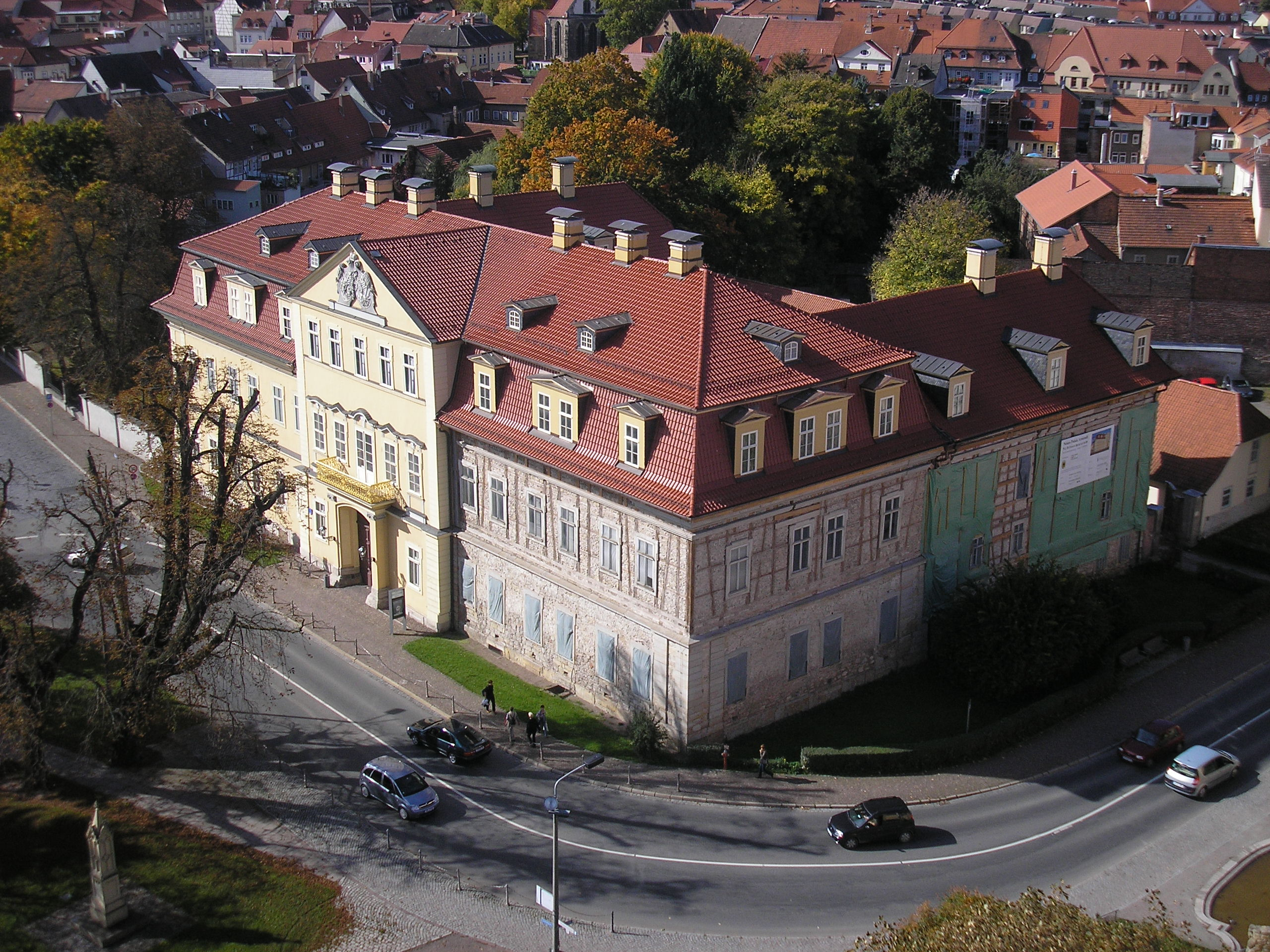
The palace of Elisabeth Albertine von Anhalt-Bernburg

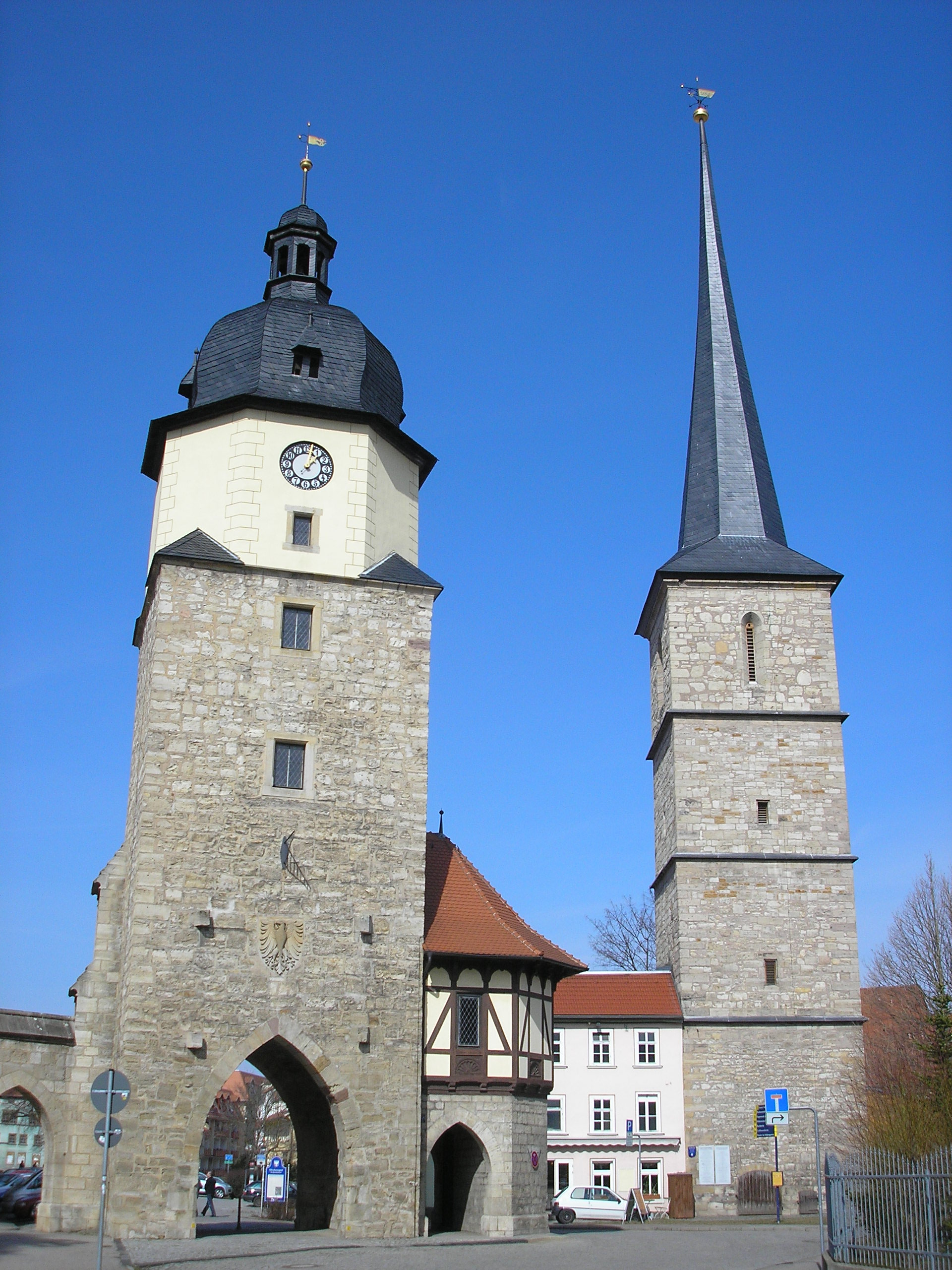
The Riedtor and the Jakobsturm
