= Bach Church, Arnstadt =

Coordinates: 50°50′03″N 10°56′46″E

Bach Church
- Johann Sebastian Bach Church
- Bachkirche
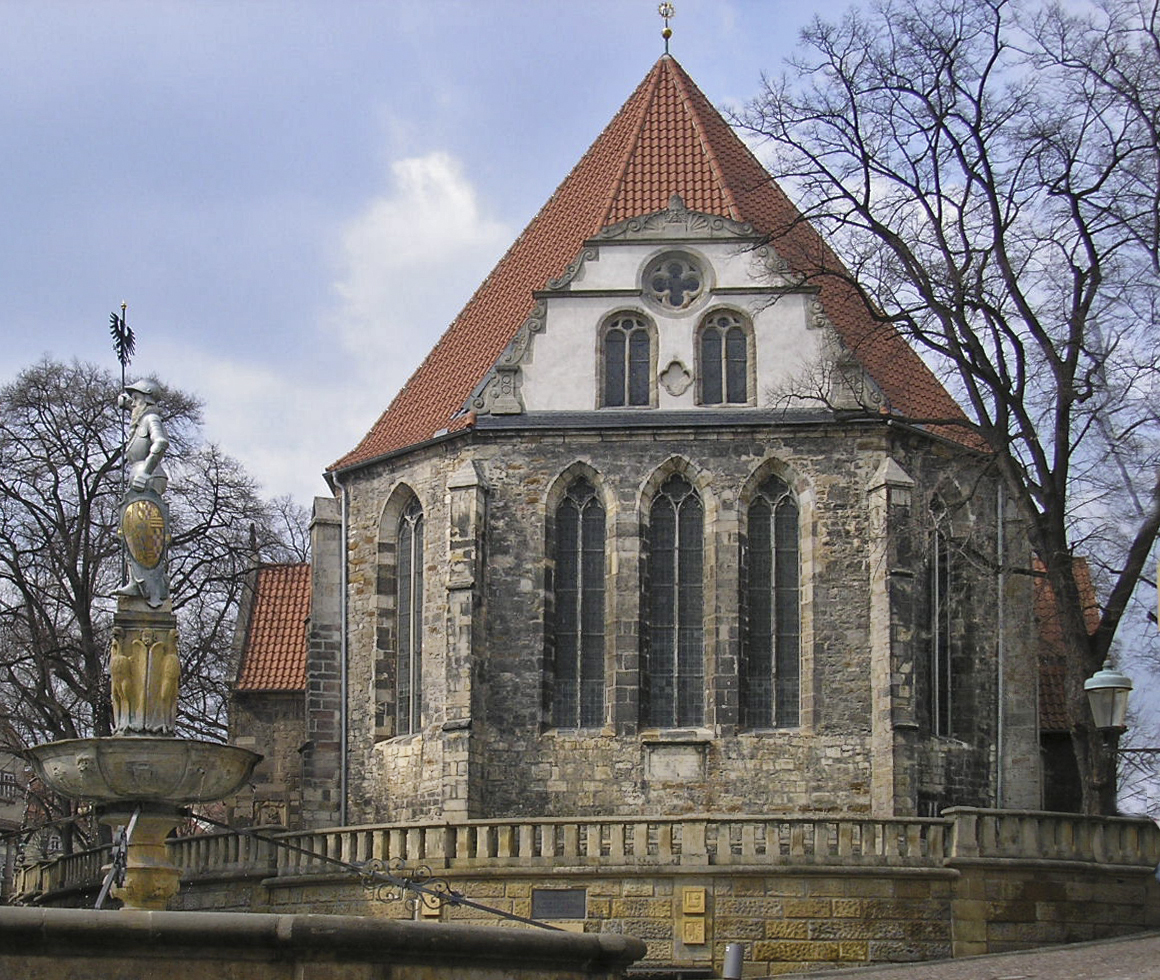
- Bach Church

- Country: Germany
- Denomination: Lutheranism

History
- Former name: New Church
- Status: Active

Architecture
- Functional status: Parish church
- Architectural type: Aisleless church
- Style: Baroque
- Years built: 1676–1683

Bach Church is the common name of a Protestant parish church in Arnstadt, Thuringia, Germany. It was officially named Johann-Sebastian-Bach-Kirche in 1935 because of its association with the composer Johann Sebastian Bach.

It was in this church that Bach played a harpsichord concerto after working for Johann Ernst III, Duke of Saxe-Weimar for 7 months.

A church on the premises named after St. Boniface burned down in 1581. A new church was built from 1676 to 1683 and simply named Neue Kirche (New church). It is a Baroque hall church with three tiers on all sides.

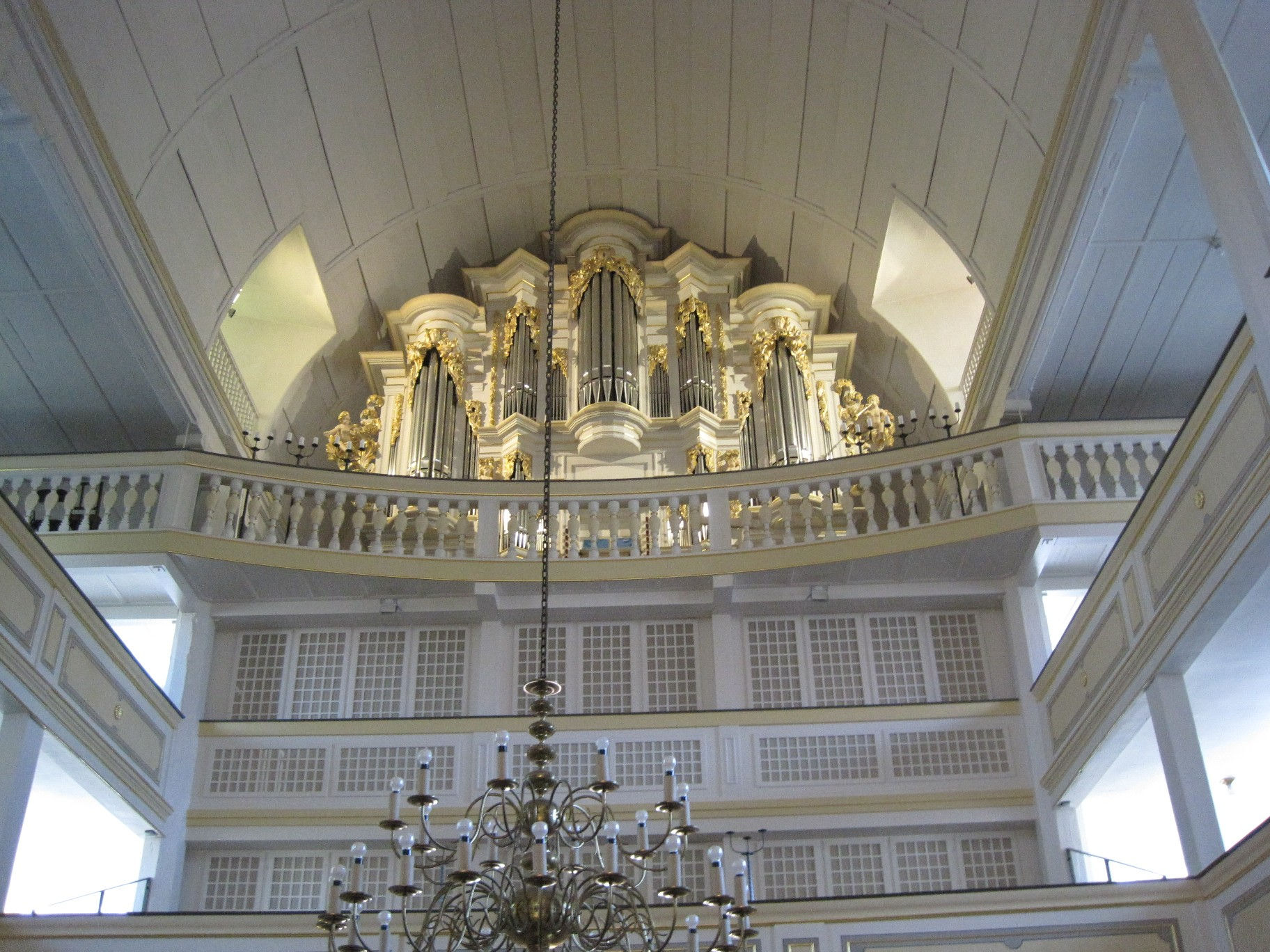
Wender-Orgel

The organ builder Johann Friedrich Wender from Mühlhausen built from 1699 to 1703 on the third tier of the church an organ with two manuals and 21 stops. It was inspected in June 1703 by Johann Sebastian Bach, then 18 years old, who was hired afterwards for the post of the organist at the church, his first position as an organist. He was succeeded in 1707 by his cousin Johann Ernst Bach who held the post to 1728. The organ was changed and restored several times. A replica of the organ was installed in the church of Pontaumur, Auvergne, which is used also for a regional Bach festival, Bach en Combrailles.

== Literature ==
- Wolff, Christoph; Zepf, Markus (2008). Die Orgeln J. S. Bachs – Ein Handbuch (in German). Leipzig: Evangelische Verlagsanstalt. ISBN 978-3-374-02407-0.
- Hoffmann, Horst (1999). Zwei Bach-Orgeln (in German). Freiburger Musik Forum. ISSN 1433-6464.
