= Schloss Gehren =

Castle ruin in Thuringia, Germany

Coordinates: 50.6476°N 11.0050°E

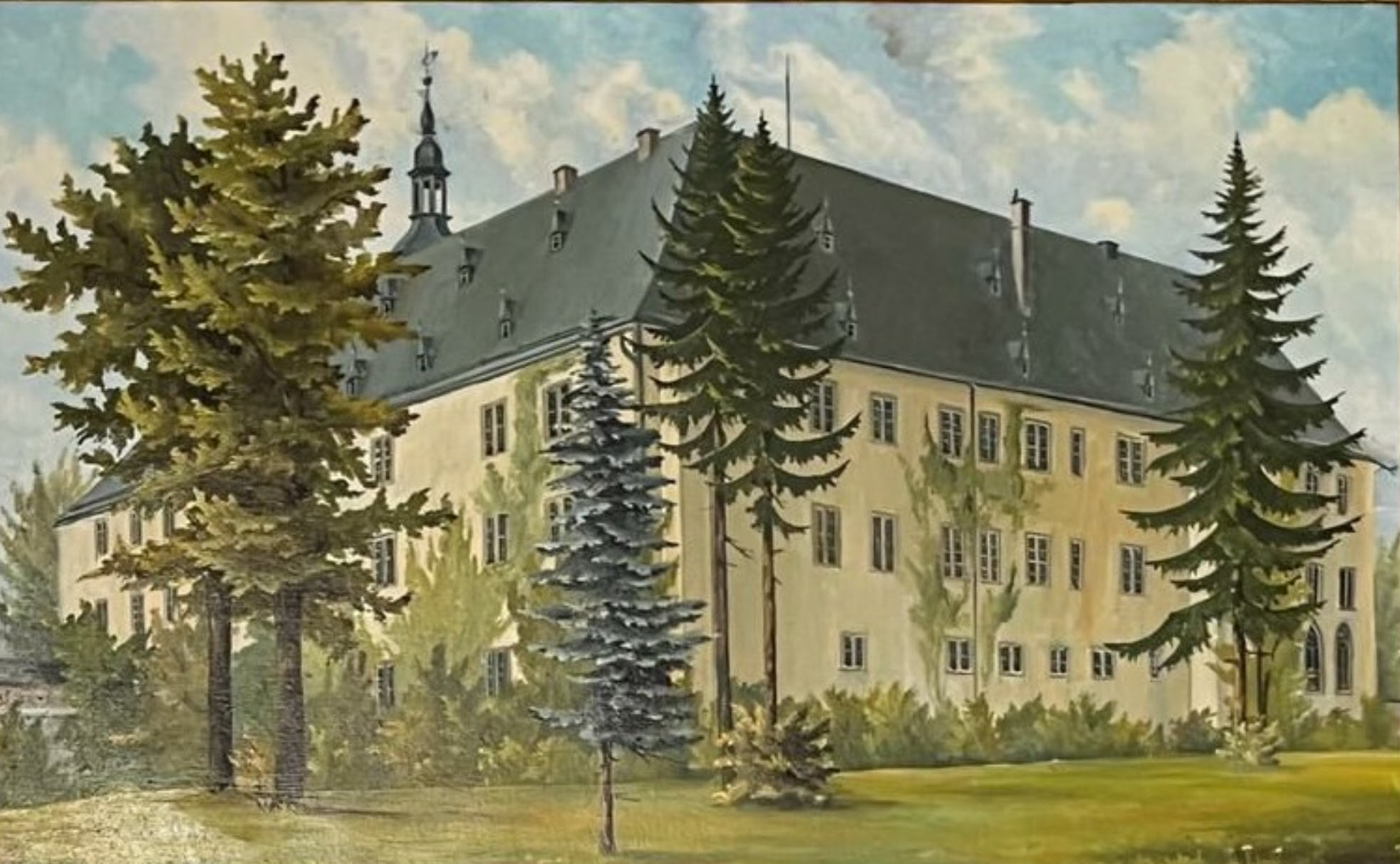
Schloss Gehren in its heyday

Schloss Gehren was a castle in the town of Gehren, today a district of Ilmenau in the Ilm-Kreis of Thuringia, Germany. Originating as a medieval water castle (Wasserburg), it was rebuilt as a Renaissance residence and served from the 17th century as a hunting lodge and summer seat of the Counts and later Princes of Schwarzburg-Sondershausen. Prince Günther XLIII used it as his main residence between 1720 and 1740. After a major fire on 11 September 1933 the buildings were largely demolished, and today only fragments of the perimeter walls survive within the surrounding Schlosspark.

== History ==
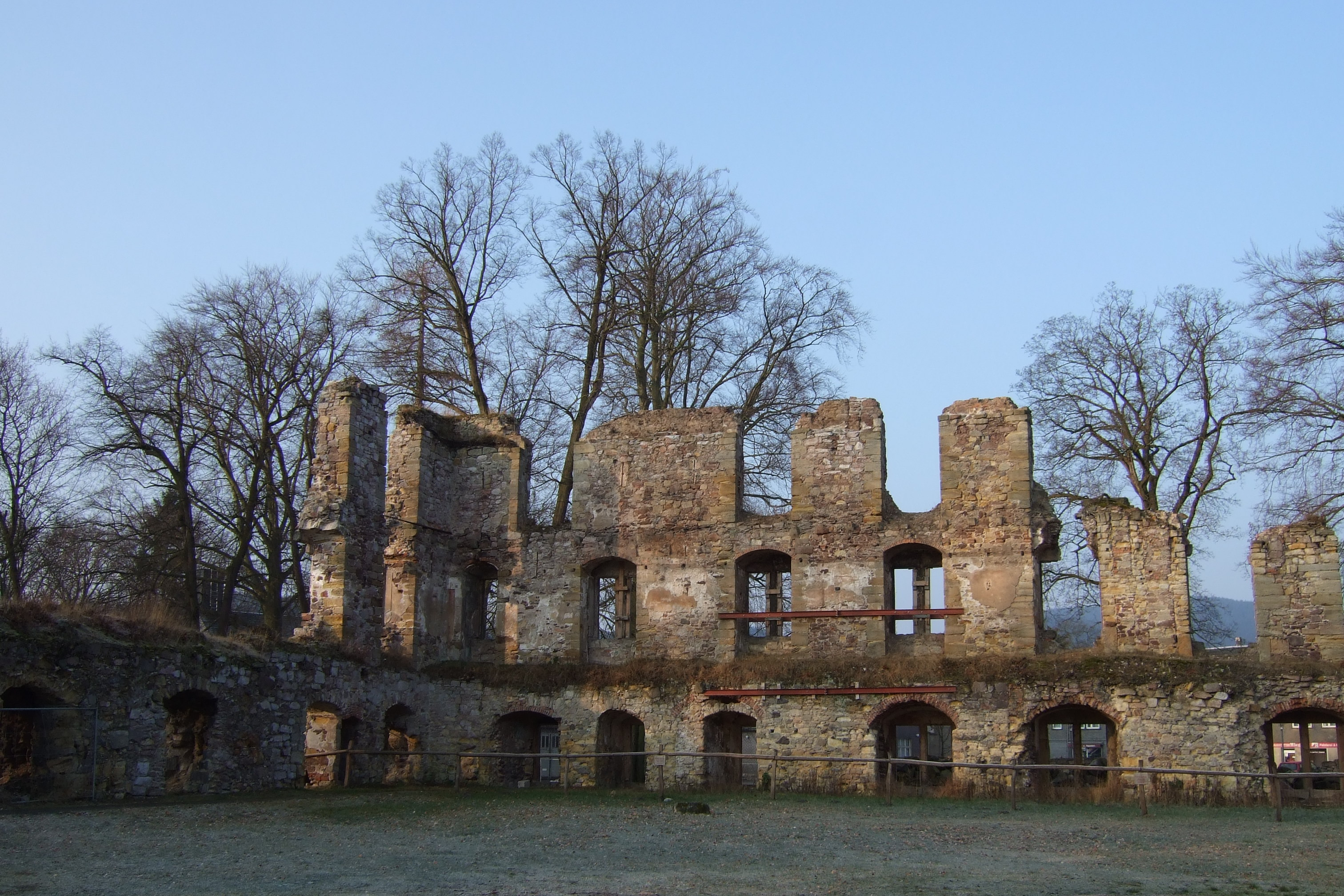
Schloss Gehren (2007)

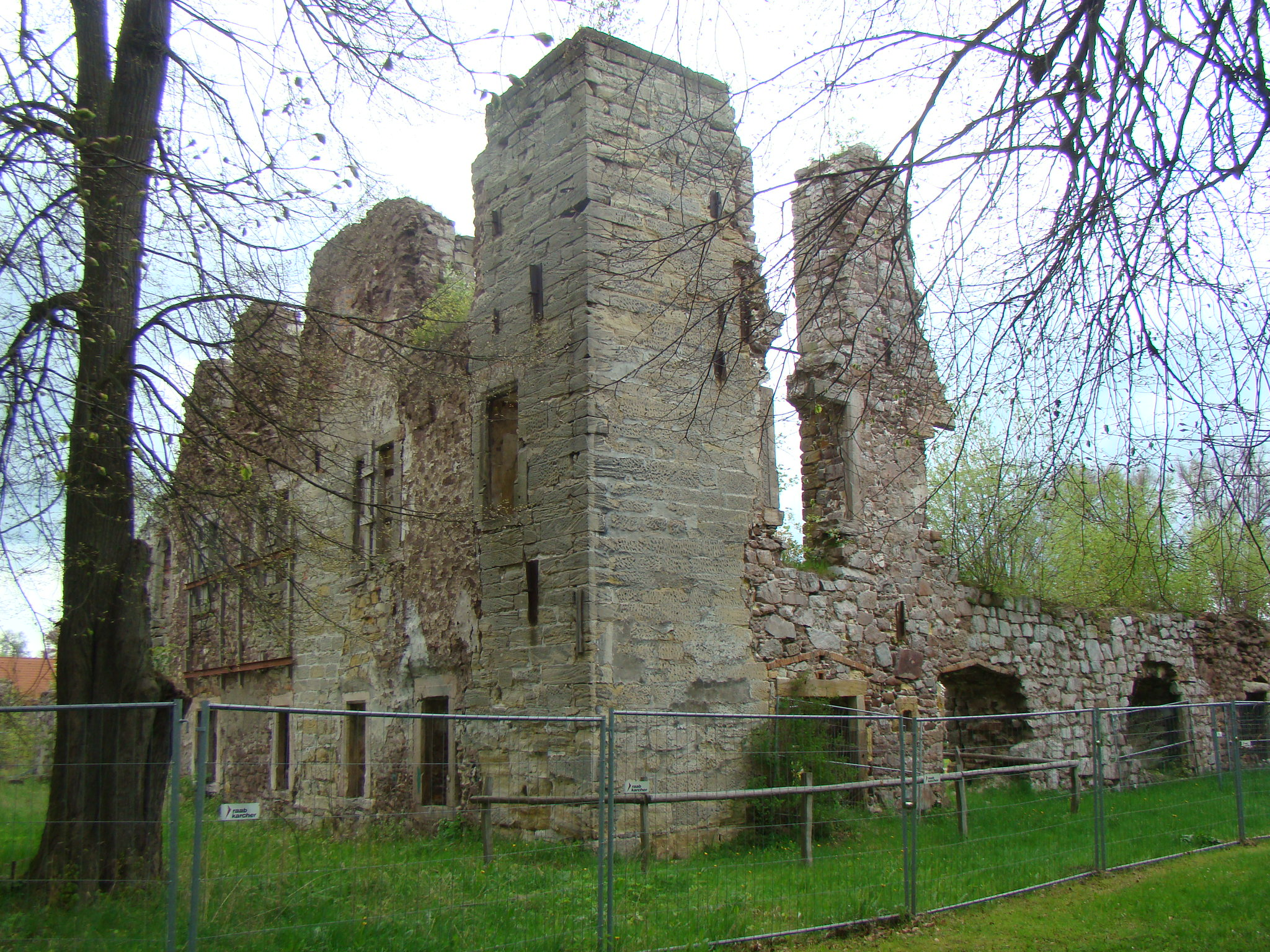
Schloss Gehren (2013)

=== Medieval origins ===
A watchtower probably stood on the site as early as the 12th century, guarding a trade route from Erfurt to Nuremberg. The complex is documented as a stable defensive structure, a Wasserburg, by 1118. The lords of Berlstedt, based in nearby Jesuborn, held the fief on behalf of the Counts of Gleichen and were entitled to collect tribute on the road. In 1308 the Berlstedts (also recorded as von Bernstedt) extended the site with what became the north wing.

=== Schwarzburg ownership ===
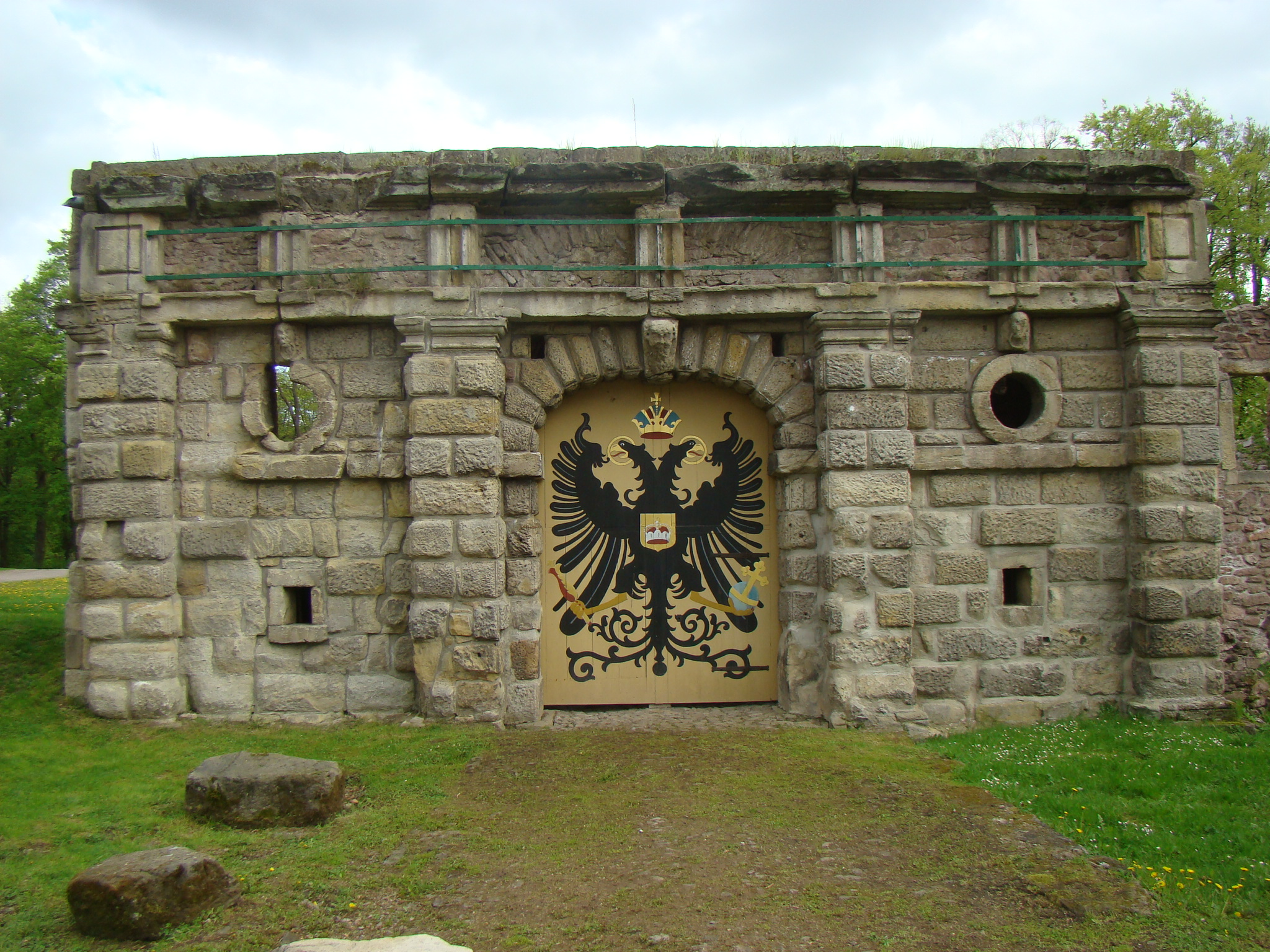
The entrance to Schloss Gehren (2013)

In 1399, Count Günther XXVIII of Schwarzburg received the Amt (administrative district) of Gehren as a fief from King Wenceslaus. In 1464 the Schwarzburgs bought the lordship outright from the Bernstedt family for 300 Rhenish guilders and added the south wing of the castle.

From 1574 the castle was substantially rebuilt in the Renaissance style, with the north and south wings unified into a single block. Sandstone blocks salvaged from the dissolved Paulinzella Abbey were reused in the construction. The castle chapel was added in 1666.

=== Residence of the princes of Schwarzburg-Sondershausen ===
The castle served as a hunting and summer residence of the Counts and (from 1697) Princes of Schwarzburg-Sondershausen. Prince Günther XLIII used it as his principal residence between 1720 and 1740. A fire broke out at the castle in 1796 but the damage was repairable. In the 19th century, it was one of the main summer residences of the princes of Schwarzburg-Sondershausen next to the hunting lodge in Possen.

=== Transfer to the state and destruction ===
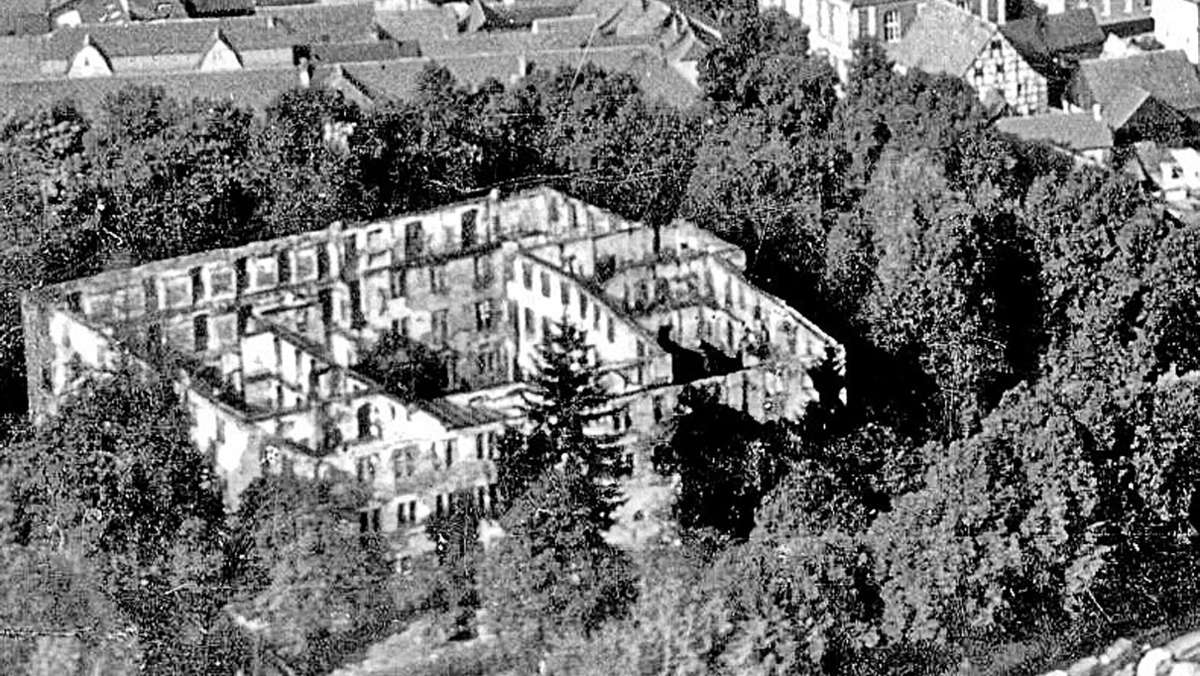
The castle after the fire

In 1918, following the abdication of the princely house, the castle passed to the Free State of Thuringia and was used mainly as housing. On 11 September 1933, around 1 p.m., a fire broke out and devastated the buildings. The most likely cause was defective chimneys, the fire began at a time of day when many cooking fires would have been burning. In the following years the heavily damaged structures were largely demolished, leaving only sections of the massive perimeter wall.

=== Today ===
Between 1997 and 2001 the surviving remains were consolidated, partly restored and made accessible to visitors. In 2023, local heritage groups again raised concern that the perimeter wall was deteriorating and at risk of partial collapse.

== Architecture ==
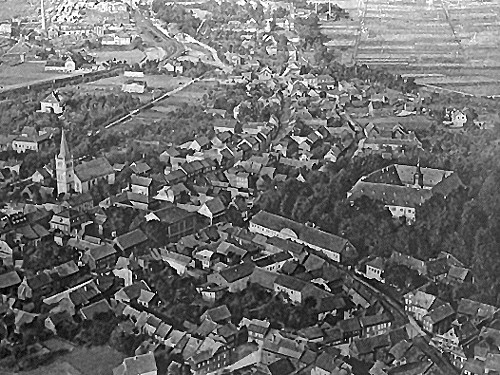
Schloss Gehren and the city seen from the air

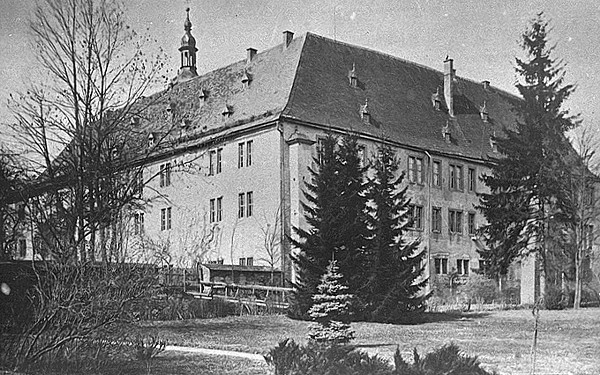
Schloss Gehren in its heyday

In its Renaissance form Schloss Gehren was a plain three-storey four-wing complex arranged around a roughly rectangular inner courtyard measuring about 31 by 27 metres. The oldest range stood on the north side; the later south, west and east wings were added during the Schwarzburg rebuilding. At the south-west corner stood the castle tower (Schlossturm), crowned by an onion dome and equipped with a repeater clock.

The west and south sides of the complex were screened by an outer Zwinger-style enclosing wall reinforced with three round corner bastions, giving the castle a castellated appearance. Several metres of this curtain wall, all three round towers and parts of the gatehouse have survived, together with portions of the inner Renaissance gate.

== Interior ==
=== The courtyard fountain ===
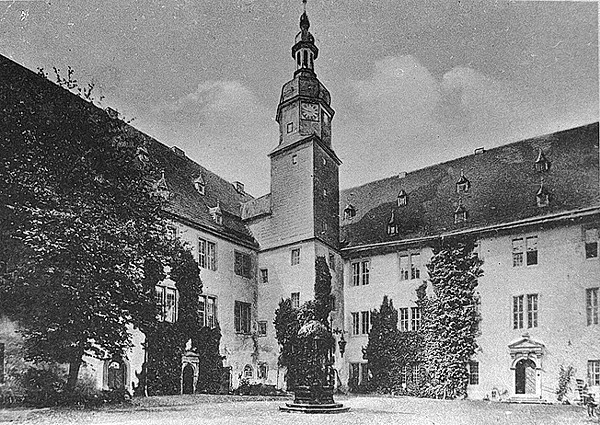
The courtyard with the fountain, tower and clock

In the centre of the inner courtyard stood one of the emblems of the castle, an ornamental fountain (Brunnen) presented to the princely couple Prince Karl Günther and his wife princess Marie on their silver wedding anniversary on 12 June 1894. A finely wrought iron superstructure rose some six metres above a red stone base and was crowned by an imperial eagle; the smithwork of its cupola was decorated with leaf arabesques, sunflowers, coats of arms and lanterns in pronounced Jugendstil style. During the restoration works of 1997 the base and superstructure of the fountain were rediscovered, incomplete and badly damaged, beneath collapsed masonry.

=== The Hirschsaal ===
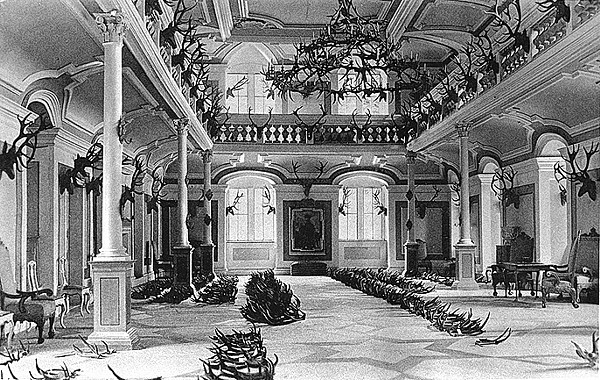
The Hirschsaal

The west wing housed what was probably the castle's best-known feature, the Hirschsaal ("Stag Hall"). This two-storey Rococo hall, encircled by a gallery carried on columns, contained more than 200 antler trophies, some of them rare and of considerable value, from princely hunts in the forests around Gehren. The lower storey displayed 51 antlers on its walls and a further 36 along the gallery balustrade, while a further 49 were mounted on the walls of the upper storey. When wall space ran out, the largest specimens were laid out on the floor. Even the chandelier, three metres in diameter, was constructed of more than 40 interlaced antlers. At the short ends of the hall hung portraits of the last princely couple of Gehren, Prince Karl Günther of Schwarzburg-Sondershausen and his wife Marie; the originals survive and are kept in the town church of Gehren, while copies are displayed in the Stadt- und Schlossmuseum.

=== The tower and clock ===
At the south-west corner of the courtyard, projecting inward into the open space, stood the tower, completed in its definitive form around 1574 and carrying a repeater clock. The clock was visible from a considerable distance, struck every quarter hour and repeated the hour stroke five minutes later.

=== The main portal and the Rüstkammer entrance ===
The courtyard face of the main portal was treated, like the outer façade, in the Doric style. Its arch was likewise built of rusticated ashlar (Buckelsteinquadern) and supported by two herms, today preserved only in fragments. Neither the main portal with its two façades nor the stone bridge over the moat was the work of the original lords of Berlstedt, but was erected around 1600 by four Schwarzburg brothers. A more precise dating from the masons' marks in this area is still pending, though the visible building history suggests that the portal stood on substantially older walls and was repeatedly altered into recent times.

A few metres from the tower, on the courtyard side, stood an architectural gem: the Renaissance portal that gave access to the armoury (Rüstkammer). It depicted, among other subjects, Adam and Eve, and had originally belonged to the ruined Stadtschloss Neideck in Arnstadt; it was installed at Gehren in 1881. Several parts of this portal were recovered in relatively good condition during the 1997 restoration works.

=== The Gehren drinking horn ===
One of the best-known surviving objects from the castle is the Gehrener Trinkhorn, a drinking horn made from the curved horn of an ibex, measuring about one metre along its outer edge. A gilded silver beaker is set into its mouth, and a silver mount around the rim bears hunting scenes, coats of arms and Roman coins. The horn is thought to have been made between 1591 and 1605. It is now owned by the town of Gehren.

=== Mon plaisir doll collection ===
The castle also originally housed the celebrated 18th-century miniature doll collection Mon plaisir, commissioned by Princess Auguste Dorothea of Schwarzburg-Sondershausen. The collection was saved during the 1933 fire and subsequently transferred to the Neues Palais museum in Arnstadt, where it remains on display.

== Site today ==
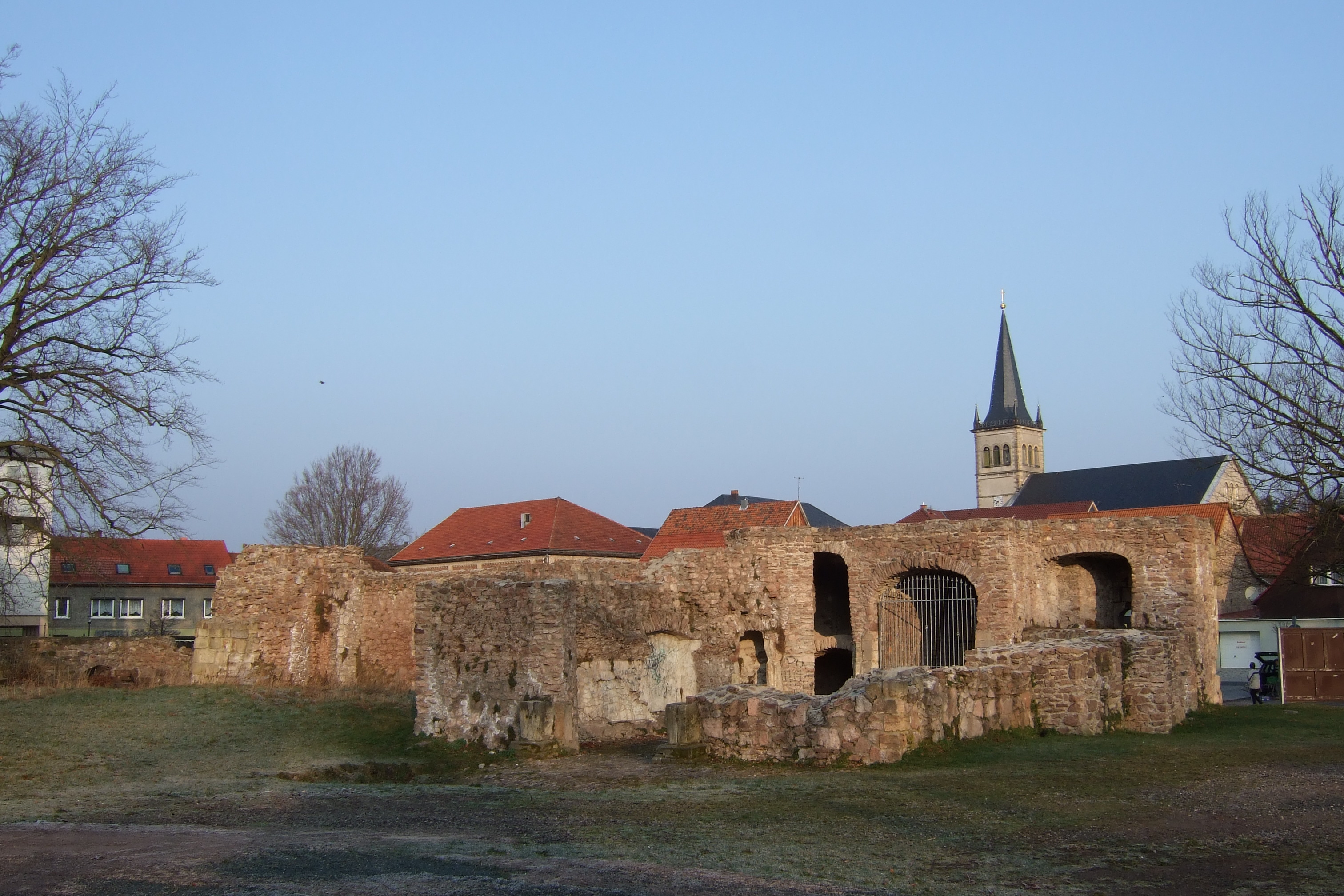
The ruins with the town churcg in the back (2007)

The ruin stands within an extensive landscape park (Schlosspark) laid out in the style of an English landscape garden. An imposing entrance portal also survives, and the ruins and park are freely accessible.

A selection of items recovered from the castle inventory, together with a photographic record of the lost interiors and a model of the complex, is displayed at the Stadt- und Schlossmuseum in Gehren.

A digital reconstruction of the lost castle has been developed by Paul Gerstenkorn, a student at the Ilmenau University of Technology, in cooperation with the local history society. It was first presented at the commemorative event marking the 90th anniversary of the 1933 fire in September 2023, and has since been further developed.

== See also ==
- Sondershausen Palace

== Literature ==
- Batke, Olaf (1993). Das Gehrener Schloß (in German). Gehren: Stadtverwaltung Gehren.
- Bienert, Thomas (2000). Mittelalterliche Burgen in Thüringen (in German). Gudensberg: Wartberg Verlag. p. 125. ISBN 3-86134-631-1.
- Georg Dehio Handbuch der Deutschen Kunstdenkmäler. Thüringen (in German). München/ Berlin: Deutscher Kunstverlag. 2003. p. 431.
- Gehren und seine Geschichte: 150 Jahre Stadtrecht 1855–2005 (in German). Gehren: Stadt Gehren. 2005. ISBN 3-86636-901-8.
