= Silver jubilee =

25th anniversary

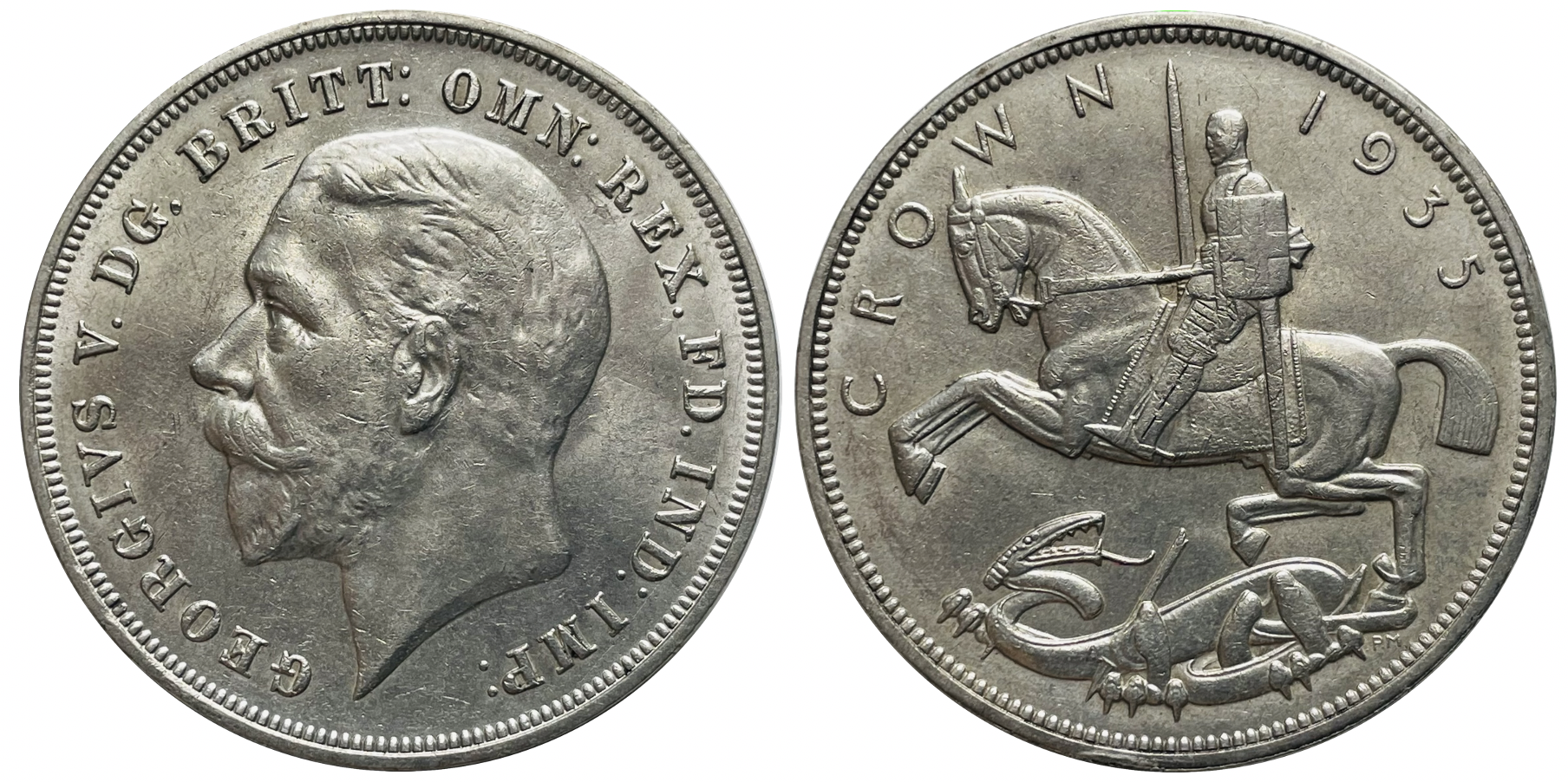
Silver coin 1 crown United Kingdom Silver Jubilee of George V - 1935

A silver jubilee marks a 25th anniversary. The anniversary celebrations can be of a wedding anniversary, the 25th year of a monarch's reign or anything that has completed or is entering a 25-year mark.

== Silver Jubilees ==
=== Royals ===
Note: This list includes various reigning princes (by various titles) of petty states in Germany and elsewhere, who do not merit the designation "royal".

Monarch	Date of silver jubilee
King George II of Great Britain	1752
Karl August, Prince of Waldeck and Pyrmont	1753
King Borommakot of Siam	1758
Charles Eugene, Duke of Württemberg	1762
King Frederick II of Prussia	1765
King Joseph I of Portugal	1775
Adolphus Frederick IV, Duke of Mecklenburg-Strelitz	1777
Christian Günther III, Prince of Schwarzburg-Sondershausen	1783
King Ferdinand IV / III of Naples and Sicily	1784
King George III of the United Kingdom	1785
Empress Catherine II of Russia	1787
Friedrich Karl August, Prince of Waldeck and Pyrmont	1788
Ferdinand I, Duke of Parma	1790
King Christian VII of Denmark	1791
Queen Maria I of Portugal	1802
King Rama I of Siam	1807
Günther Friedrich Karl I, Prince of Schwarzburg-Sondershausen	1819
King Frederick William III of Prussia	1822
Leopold II, Prince of Lippe	1827
Bernhard II, Duke of Saxe-Meiningen	1828
Friedrich Günther, Prince of Schwarzburg-Rudolstadt	1832
King Frederick VI of Denmark	1833
George II, Prince of Waldeck and Pyrmont	1838
King William I of Württemberg	1841
George, Grand Duke of Mecklenburg-Strelitz	1841
King Charles XIV John of Sweden	1843
Heinrich LXII, Prince Reuss Younger Line	1843
Heinrich LXXII, Prince Reuss of Lobenstein and Ebersdorf	1847
King Rama III of Siam	1849
Tsar Nicholas I of Russia	1850
Charles Frederick, Grand Duke of Saxe-Weimar-Eisenach	1853
King Ferdinand II of the Two Sicilies	1855
Emperor Pedro II of Brazil	1856
Günther Friedrich Karl II, Prince of Schwarzburg-Sondershausen	1860
Queen Victoria	1862
Frederick Francis II, Grand Duke of Mecklenburg-Schwerin	1867
Ernest II, Duke of Saxe-Coburg and Gotha	1869
George Victor, Prince of Waldeck and Pyrmont	1870
King George Tupou I of Tonga	1870
Pope Pius IX	1871
Louis III, Grand Duke of Hesse	1873
Emperor Franz Joseph I of Austria	2 December 1873
King William III of the Netherlands	1874
Peter II, Grand Duke of Oldenburg	1878
Charles Alexander, Grand Duke of Saxe-Weimar-Eisenach	1878
Ernst I, Duke of Saxe-Altenburg	1878
Tsar Alexander II of Russia	1880
Frederick I, Grand Duke of Baden	1881
Prince Johann II of Liechtenstein	1883
Heinrich XXII, Prince Reuss of Greiz	1884
Frederick William, Grand Duke of Mecklenburg-Strelitz	1885
King Norodom of Cambodia	1885
Adolphus I, Prince of Schaumburg-Lippe	1885
Emperor Wilhelm I of Germany	1886
King Luís I of Portugal	1886
King George I of Greece	1888
King Christian IX of Denmark	1888
King Charles I of Württemberg	1889
Georg II, Duke of Saxe-Meiningen	1891
Sheikh Abdullah II Al-Sabah of Kuwait	1891
Heinrich XIV, Prince Reuss Younger Line	1892
King Chulalongkorn of Siam	1893
Frederick I, Duke of Anhalt	1896
King Oscar II of Sweden and Norway	18 September 1897
Albert, King of Saxony	1898
Sultan Abdulhamid II of Ottoman Empire	31 August 1901
Pope Leo XIII	1903
Charles Gonthier, Prince of Schwarzburg-Sondershausen	1905
Luitpold, Prince Regent of Bavaria	1911
Emperor Wilhelm II of Germany	15 June 1913
Günther Victor, Prince of Schwarzburg	1915
Queen Wilhelmina of the Netherlands	1923
King William II of Württemberg	1916
Ernest Louis, Grand Duke of Hesse	1917
King George Tupou II of Tonga	1918
King Sobhuza II of Swaziland	1924
King Victor Emmanuel III of Italy	1925
King Haakon VII of Norway	1930
King Gustaf V of Sweden	1932
King George V of the United Kingdom	6 May 1935
King Christian X of Denmark	1937
Queen Sālote Tupou III of Tonga	1943
Prince Louis II of Monaco	1947
Sultan Ahmad Tajuddin of Brunei	1949
King Jigme Wangchuck of Bhutan	1951
Emperor Haile Selassie of Ethiopia	2 November 1955
Sultan Abu Bakar of Pahang	29 May 1957
Prince Franz Joseph II of Liechtenstein	25 July 1963
Shah Mohammad Reza Pahlavi of Iran	1966
Sultan Ismail Nasiruddin of Terengganu, Malaysia	1970
King Bhumibol of Thailand	9 June 1971
Queen Juliana of the Netherlands	1973
Prince Rainier III of Monaco	1974
King Baudouin of Belgium	1976
Queen Elizabeth II of the United Kingdom and the other Commonwealth Realms	6 February 1977
King Hussein of Jordan	1977
King Olav V of Norway	1982
Prince Shah Karim al-Hussaini, Aga Khan IV	11 July 1982 – 11 July 1983
Sultan Abdul Halim of Kedah, Malaysia	15 July 1983
King Moshoeshoe II of Lesotho	1985
Sultan Salahuddin of Selangor, Malaysia	1985
King Hassan II of Morocco	1986
Alhaji (Dr.) Ado Bayero The Emir of Kano, Nigeria	June 1988
Grand Duke Jean of Luxembourg	1989
King Tāufaʻāhau Tupou IV of Tonga	16 December 1990
Ja'afar of Negeri Sembilan	1992
Sultan Haji Hassanal Bolkiah of Brunei	5 October 1992
Sultan Qaboos bin Said of Oman	23 July 1995
Pope Shenouda III of Alexandria	1996
Joan Martí i Alanis, Co-Prince of Andorra	1996
King Birendra of Nepal	1997
Queen Margrethe II of Denmark	14 January 1997
King Jigme Singye of Bhutan	1997
King Carl XVI Gustaf of Sweden	15 September 1998
Sultan Ahmad Shah of Pahang, Malaysia	1999
King Juan Carlos I of Spain	22 November 2000
Sheikh Jaber Al-Ahmad Al-Sabah of Kuwait	31 December 2002
Pope John Paul II	2003
Sultan Ismail Petra of Kelantan, Malaysia	30 March 2004
Queen Beatrix of the Netherlands	29 April 2005
Sultan Azlan Shah of Perak, Malaysia	3 February 2009
King Mswati III of Swaziland	25 April 2011
Emperor Akihito of Japan	7 January 2014
Prince Hans-Adam II of Liechtenstein	13 November 2014
King Harald V of Norway	17 January 2016
King Letsie III of Lesotho	7 February 2021
Sultan Mizan Zainal Abidin of Terengganu, Malaysia	2023
King Abdullah II of Jordan	7 February 2024
King Hamad bin Isa Al Khalifa of Bahrain	6 March 2024
Asantehene Otumfuo Nana Osei Tutu II of Asante	26 April 2024
King Mohammed VI of Morocco	30 July 2024 (Note: Anniversary of his formal enthronement on 30 July 1999 (Throne Day). Mohammed was king retroactively to the death of his father, Hassan II, on 23 July 1999.)
Raja Sirajuddin of Perlis, Malaysia	17 April 2025
Sultan Sharafuddin of Selangor, Malaysia	25 October 2026

=== Non-royal state leaders ===
Non-royal state leaders	Date of silver jubilee
Leader Joseph Stalin of the Soviet Union	1949
Leader Enver Hoxha of Albania	1969
Supreme Leader Kim Il Sung of North Korea	1973
Chairman Mao Zedong of China	1974
Leader Yumjaagiin Tsedenbal of Mongolia	1977
Leader Todor Zhivkov of Bulgaria	1979
Leader Janos Kadar of Hungary	1981
President Urho Kekkonen of Finland	1 March 1981
President Habib Bourguiba of Tunisia	1982
President Sekou Toure of Guinea	1983
President Ne Win of Burma	1987
President Kenneth Kaunda of Zambia	1989
President Mobutu Sese Seko of DR Congo	1990
President Hastings Banda of Malawi	1991
President Gnassingbe Eyadema of Togo	1992
President Suharto of Indonesia	1992
President Omar Bongo of Gabon	1992
Brotherly Leader and Guide of the Revolution Muammar Gaddafi of Libya	1 September 1994
President Hafez al-Assad of Syria	1996
President Albert Rene of Seychelles	2002
President Ali Abdullah Saleh of Yemen	2003
President Teodoro Obiang of Equatorial Guinea	2004
President Jose dos Santos of Angola	2004
President Hosni Mubarak of Egypt	2006
President Paul Biya of Cameroon	2007
President Yoweri Museveni of Uganda	2011
President Robert Mugabe of Zimbabwe	2012
President Islam Karimov of Uzbekistan	2014
Supreme Leader Ali Khamenei of Iran	2014
President Nursultan Nazarbayev of Kazakhstan	2014
President Omar al-Bashir of Sudan	2014
President Idriss Deby of Chad	2015
President Isaias Afwerki of Eritrea	2016
President Emomali Rahmon of Tajikistan	2017

=== Organizations ===
Organizations	Date of silver jubilee
International Olympic Committee	23 June 1919
BBC	18 October 1947
Warner Bros. Pictures	4 April 1948
The Walt Disney Company	16 October 1948
Metro-Goldwyn-Mayer	17 April 1949
United Nations	24 October 1970
Disneyland Resort	17 July 1980
Universal Studios Hollywood	15 July 1989
Walt Disney World	1 October 1996
Tokyo Disney Resort	15 April 2003
Epcot	1 October 2007
Disney's Hollywood Studios	1 May 2014
Universal Orlando	7 June 2015
Disneyland Paris	26 March 2017
Disney's Animal Kingdom	22 April 2023
Wikipedia	15 January 2026
Disney California Adventure	8 February 2026
Tokyo DisneySea	4 September 2026

== South Asian film terminology ==
In India and Pakistan, a silver jubilee film is commonly described as a movie shown continuously in cinemas in one city for 25 straight weeks without any interruptions.

== See also ==
- Hierarchy of precious substances
- List of longest-reigning monarchs
- List of current reigning monarchs by length of reign
- Wedding anniversary
