= Günther Friedrich Karl II of Schwarzburg-Sondershausen =

Günther Friedrich Karl II
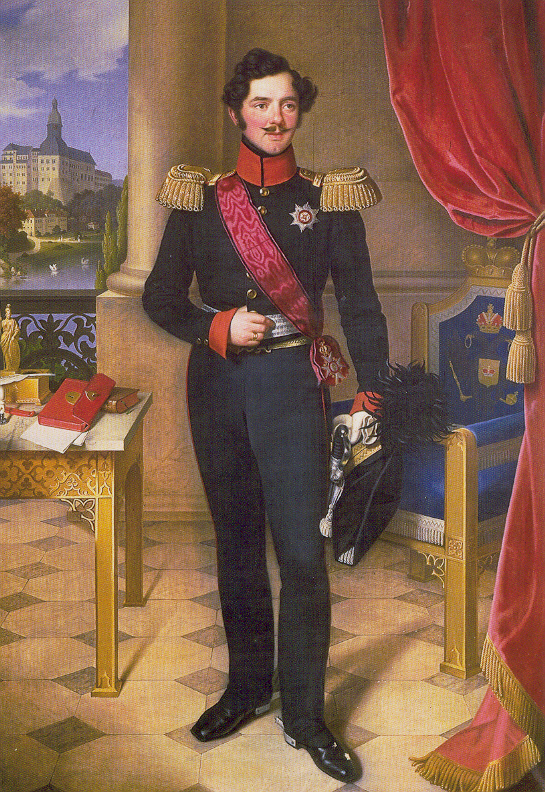
- Portrait, 1837

Prince of Schwarzburg-Sondershausen
- Reign: 19 August 1835 – 17 July 1880
- Predecessor: Günther Friedrich Karl I
- Successor: Charles Gonthier
- Born: 24 September 1801; Sondershausen
- Died: 15 September 1889 (aged 87); Sondershausen
- Spouse: Princess Caroline of Schwarzburg-Rudolstadt (m. 1827; 1833) Princess Mathilde zu Hohenlohe-Öhringen (m. 1835; div. 1852)
- Issue: Günther Friedrich Karl Alexander; Elisabeth Caroline Louise; Karl Günther; Leopold; Marie; Hugh
- House: House of Schwarzburg
- Father: Günther Friedrich Karl I
- Mother: Caroline of Schwarzburg-Rudolstadt

Günther Friedrich Karl II of Schwarzburg-Sondershausen (24 September 1801 – 15 September 1889) was the ruling Prince of Schwarzburg-Sondershausen following his father's abdication in 1835 until his own abdication in 1880. After Schwarzburg-Sondershausen joined the North German Confederation, he joined the Royal Prussian Army, and in 1879 became General of the Infantry.

== Early life ==
The Prince was born at Sondershausen Palace in Sondershausen on 24 September 1801. He was the only son of Günther Friedrich Karl I and Caroline of Schwarzburg-Rudolstadt. His older sister Emilie was married to Prince Leopold II of Lippe, the reigning prince of Lippe.

His paternal grandparents were Christian Günther III and the former Charlotte Wilhelmine of Anhalt-Bernburg (a daughter of Prince Victor Frederick II of Anhalt-Bernburg). His maternal grandparents were Prince Friedrich Karl of Schwarzburg-Rudolstadt and Friederike Schwarzburg-Rudolstadt. Through his sister, he was uncle to nine, including Leopold III, Prince of Lippe (who married Princess Elisabeth of Schwarzburg-Rudolstadt), Woldemar, Prince of Lippe (who married Princess Sophie of Baden), and Alexander, Prince of Lippe.

== Career ==
Royal Monogram of Gonthier Frederick Charles II

In 1806, during his father's reign, the Holy Roman Empire, which delicately held the German monarchies together, collapsed and the principality of Schwarzburg-Sondershausen joined the Confederation of the Rhine which was a group of states of Napoleon Bonaparte's First French Empire. It also collapsed in 1813 and, in 1815, Schwarzburg-Sondershausen joined the German Confederation created by the Congress of Vienna.

His father ruled as an absolute monarch and was deeply unpopular over his refusal to make any concessions to increase government participation by his subjects. His father's actions led to a palace revolt spearheaded by Günther Frederick Charles II that was known as the Ebeleben Revolution, which resulted in his father's abdication on 19 August 1835 in Günther Frederick Charles II's favor. His father spent the rest of his life at his hunting lodge, Jagdschloss "Zum Possen" near Sondershausen, where he died in April 1837.

Not long after Günther Friedrich Karl II became the reigning prince, Schwarzburg-Sondershausen joined the Zollverein. In 1840, the principality adopted a new constitution instituting the first state parliament. During the Revolutions of 1848, uprisings in the principality led to another new constitution which limited the prince's rights. In 1857, the constitution was reformed and the majority of the prince's rights were restored.

In 1867, the principality joined the North German Confederation as one of seven principalities led by the Kingdom of Prussia, the largest and predominant member. Günther Friedrich Karl II became a Major General in the Prussian Army and in 1879 became General of the Infantry. In 1871, the German Empire was formed and the principality became a constituent member. On 17 July 1880, Günther Friedrich Karl II abdicated, due to an eye condition, in favor of his son, Charles Günther.

== Personal life ==
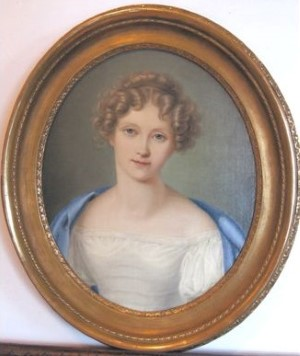
His first wife, Princess Caroline of Schwarzburg-Rudolstadt

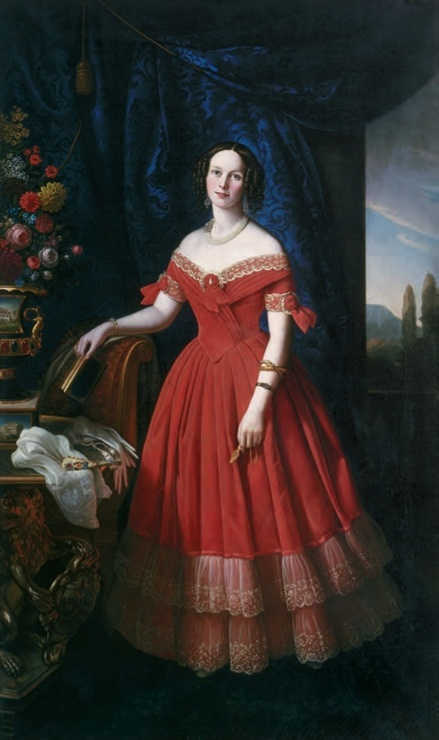
His second wife, Princess Mathilde zu Hohenlohe-Öhringen

On 12 March 1827 Günther Friedrich Karl II married his first cousin, Princess Caroline of Schwarzburg-Rudolstadt, a daughter of Prince Charles Günther of Schwarzburg-Rudolstadt (son of Frederick Charles, Prince of Schwarzburg-Rudolstadt) and Landgravine Louise Ulrica of Hesse-Homburg (daughter of Frederick V, Landgrave of Hesse-Homburg). Before her death on 29 March 1833, they had four children, including:

- Günther Friedrich Karl Alexander (1829–1833), who died in childhood.
- Elisabeth Caroline Louise (1829–1893), who died unmarried.
- Karl Günther (1830–1909), who married Princess Marie Gasparine of Saxe-Altenburg, Duchess of Saxony, the daughter of Prince Eduard of Saxe-Altenburg.
- Günther Leopold (1832–1906), who died unmarried.

After her death, he married Princess Friederike Mathilde zu Hohenlohe-Öhringen (1814–1888), a daughter of August, Prince of Hohenlohe-Öhringen and Louise of Württemberg. Before their divorce in 1852, they had two more children, including:

- Marie Pauline Caroline Luise Wilhelmine Auguste (1837–1921), who died unmarried.
- Günther Friedrich Karl August Hugo (1839–1871), who died unmarried.

Princess Mathilde died at Mirabell Palace in Salzburg, Austria, in 1888. Günther Friedrich Karl II died in Sondershausen on 15 September 1889. In April 1896, Prince Karl Günther and the remaining dynasts, his brother Prince Leopold and cousin Prince Günther Victor of Schwarzburg-Rudolstadt, none of whom had male issue, agreed that their morganatic relative Prince Sizzo of Leutenberg was to become a member of the princely house with full succession rights. Their decision became law on 1 June 1896. Upon Prince Karl Günther's death in 1909, he was succeeded by his cousin, Prince Günther Victor, in whom both Schwarzburg principalities became vested in a personal union. On the death of the childless Prince Günther Victor in 1925, he was succeeded by Prince Sizzo. (Note: Upon the fall of the German monarchies in 1918, during the German Revolution of 1918-1919, the principality of Schwarzburg-Sondershausen became a republic and, in 1920, joined with other small states in the area to form the new state of Thuringia.)

== Orders and decorations ==
- Kingdom of Bavaria: Knight of the Royal Order of Saint Hubert, 1822
- Württemberg: Grand Cross of the Order of the Württemberg Crown, 1835
- Saxe-Weimar-Eisenach: Grand Cross of the Order of the White Falcon, 18 October 1838
- Kingdom of Prussia:
  - Knight of the Order of the Black Eagle, 17 May 1850
  - Grand Commander's Cross of the Royal House Order of Hohenzollern, 5 April 1875
- Oldenburg: Grand Cross of the House and Merit Order of Duke Peter Friedrich Ludwig, with Golden Crown, 12 April 1863
- (Saxe-Coburg and Gotha) (Duchy of Saxe-Altenburg) (Saxe-Meiningen) Ernestine duchies: Grand Cross of the Saxe-Ernestine House Order, 1872

Günther Friedrich Karl II of Schwarzburg-Sondershausen House of Schwarzburg Born: 24 September 1801 Died: 15 September 1889
Preceded by Günther Frederick Charles I	Prince of Schwarzburg-Sondershausen; 1835-1880; abdicated	Succeeded by Karl Günther
