= Christiane Emilie of Schwarzburg-Sondershausen =

German noblewoman

Christiane Emilie
- Duchess of Mecklenburg-Strelitz
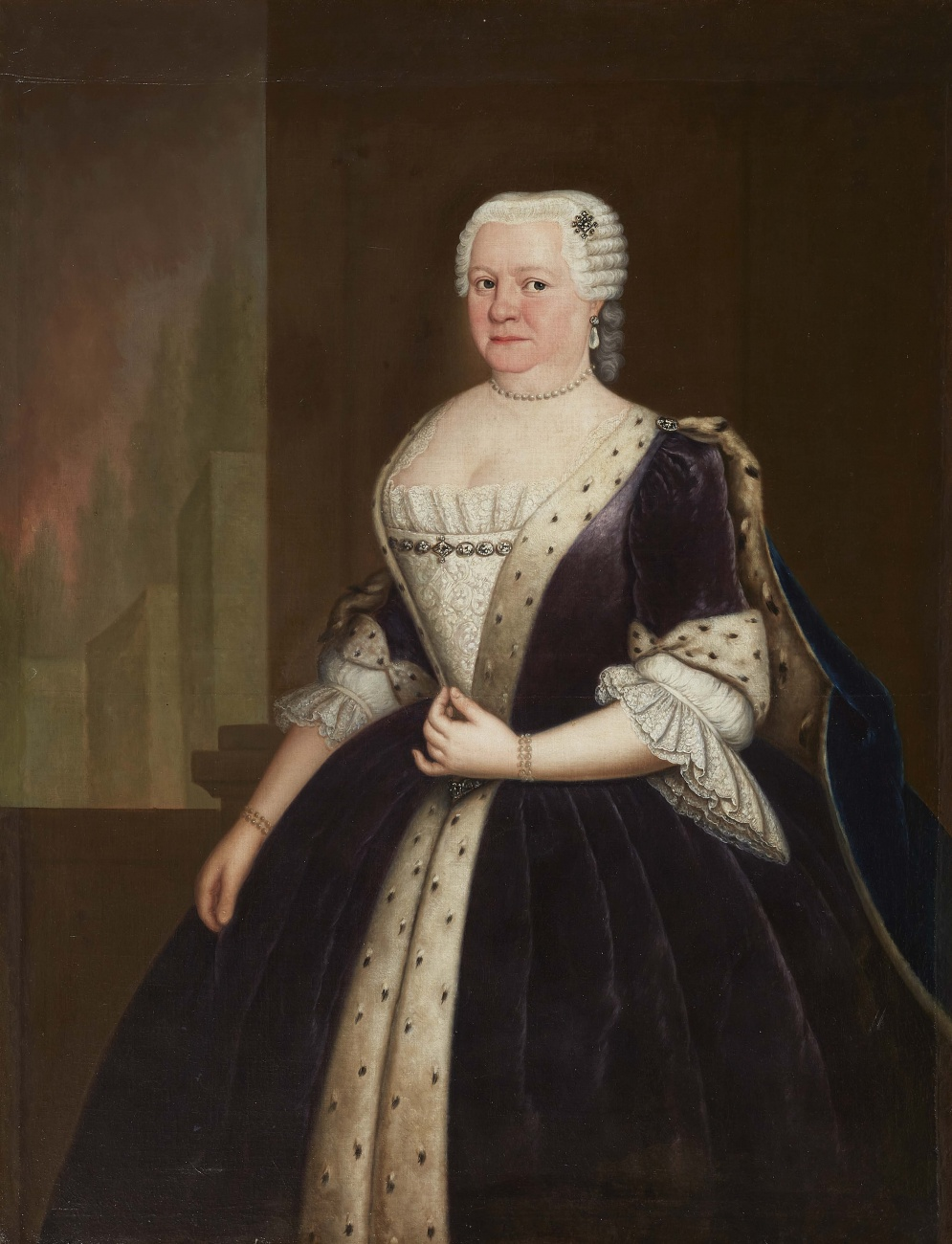
- Portrait of Christiane Emilie
- Born: 13 March 1681; Sondershausen
- Died: 1 November 1751 (aged 70); Mirow
- Spouse: Adolphus Frederick II, Duke of Mecklenburg-Strelitz (m. 1705)
- Issue: Duchess Sophie; Duke Charles Louis Frederick
Names
- Christiane Emilie Antonie
- House: House of Schwarzburg
- Father: Christian William I, Prince of Schwarzburg-Sondershausen
- Mother: Antonie Sybille of Barby-Mühlingen

Christiane Emilie Antonie of Schwarzburg-Sondershausen (13 March 1681 – 1 November 1751) was a German noblewoman who became Duchess consort of Mecklenburg-Strelitz through her marriage to Adolphus Frederick II, Duke of Mecklenburg-Strelitz.

== Early life and family ==
Christiane Emilie was born on 13 March 1681 in Sondershausen. She was the daughter of Christian William I, Prince of Schwarzburg-Sondershausen, and his first wife, Antonie Sybille of Barby-Mühlingen. Her paternal grandparents were Anton Günther I, Count of Schwarzburg-Sondershausen, and Countess Palatine Maria Magdalene of Birkenfeld. Christiane Emilie had several siblings, including Günther XLIII and Henry XXXV, both of whom held the title of Prince of Schwarzburg-Sondershausen.

== Marriage and issue ==
On 10 June 1705, Christiane Emilie married Adolphus Frederick II, Duke of Mecklenburg-Strelitz, in Strelitz. This was Frederick II's third marriage, following the death of his second wife, Princess Johanna of Saxe-Gotha. Christiane Emilie and Adolphus Frederick II had the following children together:

- Duchess Sophie Christiane Luise of Mecklenburg-Strelitz (12 October 1706 – 22 December 1708).
- Duke Charles Louis Frederick of Mecklenburg (23 February 1708 – 5 June 1752): Succeeded his father as Duke of Mecklenburg-Strelitz; married Princess Elisabeth Albertine of Saxe-Hildburghausen.

== Later life and death ==
Christiane Emilie served as Duchess consort of Mecklenburg-Strelitz from her marriage in 1705 until her husband's death in 1708. Following her husband's passing, she resided in Mirow, where she raised her son, Charles Louis Frederick, whose son would later become the Duke of Mecklenburg-Strelitz. Christiane Emilie died on 1 November 1751 in Mirow and was interred in the local church.
