= 1919 Schwarzburg-Sondershausen state election =

German state election

The 1919 Schwarzburg-Sondershausen state election was held on 26 January 1919 to elect the 16 members of the Landtag of Schwarzburg-Sondershausen.

== Results ==
Party	Votes	%	Seats
Social Democratic Party of Germany and Independent Social Democratic Party of Germany	25,699	62.85	10
German Democratic Party	6,561	16.05	3
German National People's Party	6,264	15.32	2
Civil List	2,367	5.79	1
Total	40,891	100.00	16
Registered voters/turnout	56,478	–	
Source: Elections in the Weimar Republic
