= Christian William I of Schwarzburg-Sondershausen =

German nobleman and prince

Christian William
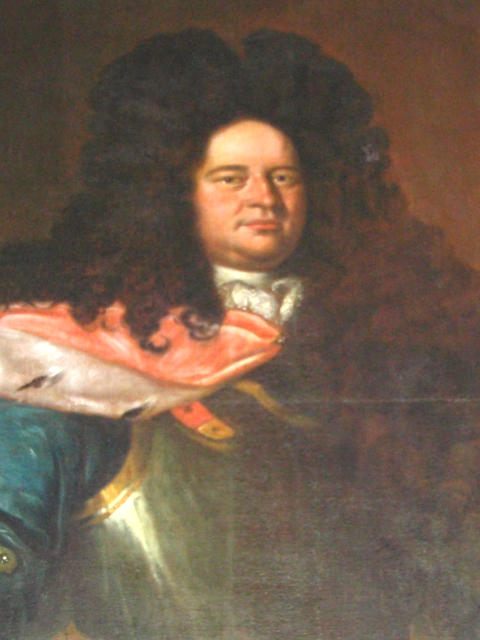
- Portrait of Christian William, 1702
- Born: 6 January 1647; Sondershausen
- Died: 10 May 1721 (aged 74); Sondershausen
- Spouse: Antonie Sybille of Barby-Mühlingen; Wilhelmine Christiane of Saxe-Weimar
- Issue: Günther XLIII, Prince of Schwarzburg-Sondershausen; Henry XXXV, Prince of Schwarzburg-Sondershausen; Christiane Emilie, Duchess of Mecklenburg-Strelitz
- House: Schwarzburg
- Father: Anton Günther I, Count of Schwarzburg-Sondershausen
- Mother: Countess Palatine Maria Magdalene of Birkenfeld

Christian William I of Schwarzburg (6 January 1647 – 10 May 1721) was Count and later Prince of Schwarzburg-Sondershausen, Count of Hohenstein, Lord of Sondershausen, Arnstadt and Leutenberg. From 1681, he also carried the title of Count in Ebeleben, and from 1716 Count in Arnstadt.

== Life ==
Christian William was born and died in Sondershausen, Schwarzburg-Sondershausen. He was a son of Count Anton Günther I of Schwarzburg-Sondershausen and his wife Countess Palatine Maria Magdalene of Birkenfeld (1622–1689).

In 1666 he succeeded his father jointly with his brother Anton Günther II. In 1681, they divided the country and Anton Günther became Count of Schwarzburg-Arnstadt. On 3 September 1697, the brothers were raised to Imperial Princes by Emperor Leopold I. Anton Günther died in 1716 and Arnstadt fell back to Christian William.

He concluded a treaty of succession with his brother, in which the indivisibility of Schwarzburg-Sondershausen was established and primogeniture would determine the succession. After Prince Louis Frederick I of Schwarzburg-Rudolstadt joined the treaty in 1710, it was confirmed in 1719 by Emperor Charles VI.

During Christian Williams reign, Schwarzburg-Sondershausen broke away from the increasing dominance of the Electorate of Saxony. He renovated his Sondershausen Palace and reshaped it from a Renaissance style to a Baroque style. A cultural center in northern Thuringia was named after him.

== Marriage and issue ==
In 1672, Christian Williams was engaged with the hymn poet Ludmilla Elisabeth of Schwarzburg-Rudolstadt, but she died unexpectedly later that year.

He married on 22 August 1673 Antonie Sybille (1641–1684), daughter of Count Albert Frederick I of Barby-Mühlingen, with whom he had the following children:

- Anton Albert (1674–1680)
- August William (1676–1690)
- Günther XLIII (1678–1740), who succeeded him as ruling Prince of Schwarzburg-Sondershausen (1720–1740)
- Sophie Magdalene (1680–1751), married Count George Albert of Schönburg-Hartenstein (1673–1716)
- Christiane Emilie (1681–1751) married Duke Adolph Frederick II of Mecklenburg-Strelitz
- Albertine Louise (1682–1765)
- Antonie Sibille (1684)

Christian William married a second time in 1684, with Wilhelmine Christiane (1658–1712), daughter of the Duke John Ernest II of Saxe-Weimar, with whom he had the following children:

- Johanne Auguste (1686–1703)
- Christiane Wilhelmine (1688–1749)
- Henry XXXV (1689–1758), who succeeded his half-brother Günther as ruling Prince of Schwarzburg-Sondershausen (1740–1758)
- August I (1691–1750), who also held the title of Prince of Schwarzburg-Sondershausen, but never ruled. His son was:
  - Christian Günther III, Prince of Schwarzburg-Sondershausen
- Ernestine Henriette (1692–1759)
- Rudolph (1695–1749)
- William II (1699–1762)
- Christian (1700–1749), who also held the title of Prince of Schwarzburg-Sondershausen, but never ruled; he married Sophie Christine Eberhardine, daughter of Lebrecht, Prince of Anhalt-Zeitz-Hoym

Christian William I of Schwarzburg-Sondershausen House of Schwarzburg Born: 6 January 1647 Died: 10 May 1721
Preceded by Anton Günther I as Count of Schwarzburg-Sondershausen	Prince of Schwarzburg-Sondershausen; 1666-1720	Succeeded by Günther XLIII as Günther I
