= Carl Scheppig =

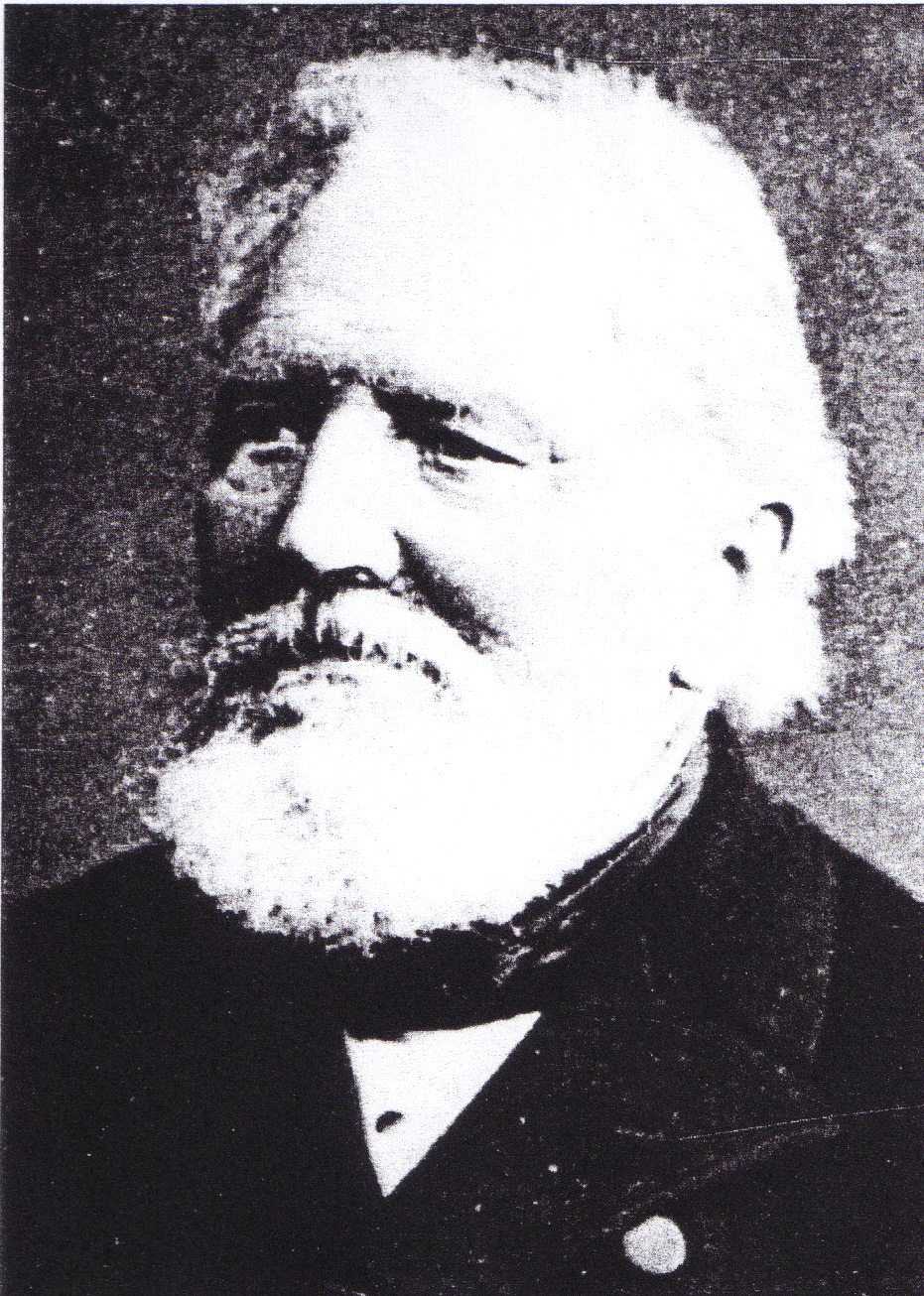
Carl Scheppig

Carl Friedrich Adolph Scheppig (18 January 1803 in Berlin, † 22 February 1885 in Sondershausen) was a key architect of the late Neoclassicism in Germany and major student of the Berlin architect Karl Friedrich Schinkel.

He worked successfully mainly in Berlin and Sondershausen.

== Some Works ==
- Building repair at the German Cathedral and French Cathedral in Berlin
- Construction manager in revamping the palace of Prince Karl of Prussia in Berlin
- Construction manager for the remodeling of the Jerusalem's Church in Berlin
- Transformation of the residential palace in Sondershausen
- Construction of the district court, the prison and the stables of Sondershausen

== Sources ==
- Apfelstedt, F. Bau- und Kunstdenkmäler des Fürstenthums Schwarzburg-Sondershausen, Erstes Heft: Die Unterherrschaft, 1886
- Kulturamt der Stadt Sondershausen. Persönlichkeiten in Sondershausen, 1993
