= Gehren =

- Stadtteil of Ilmenau
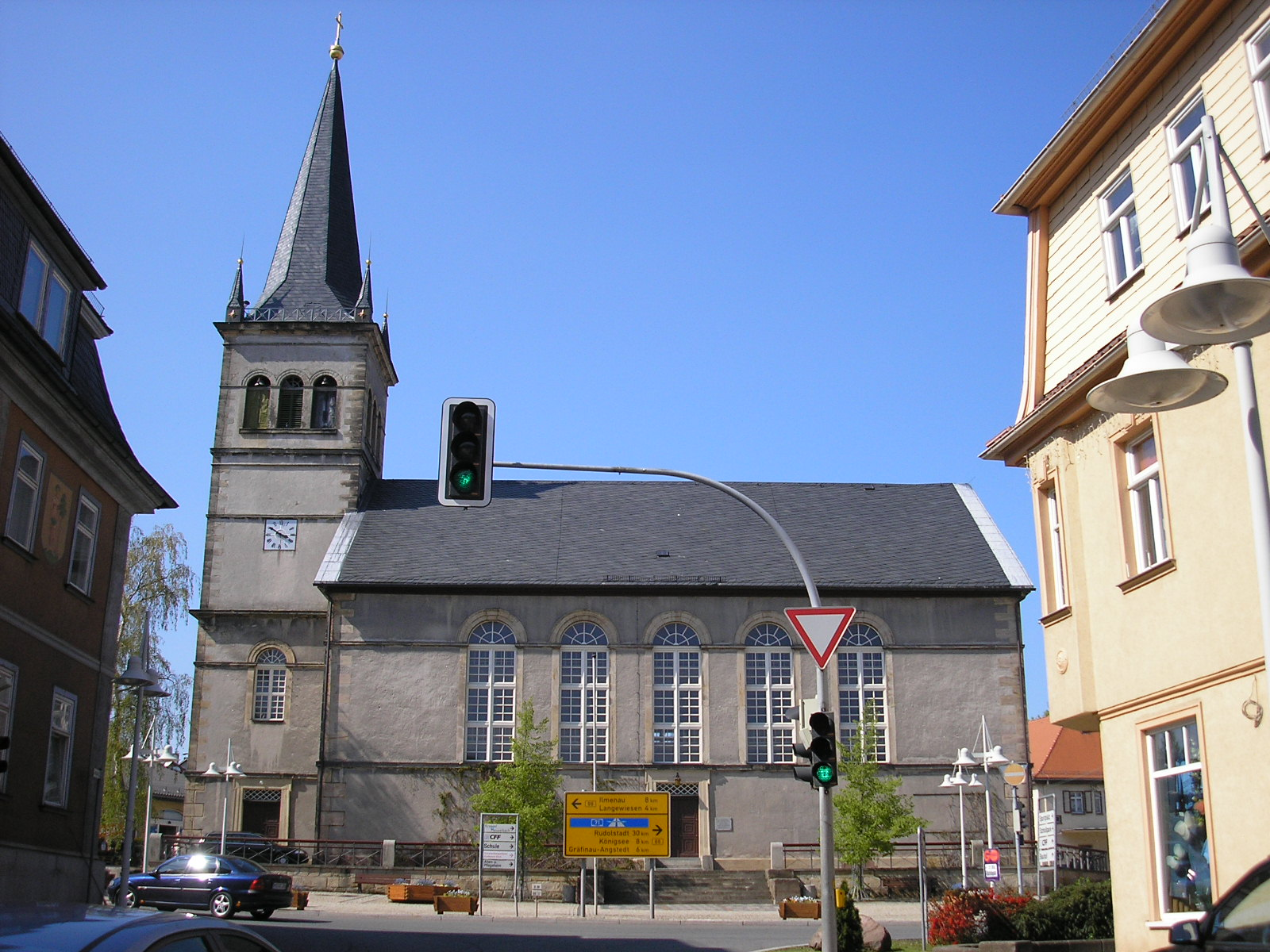
- Church

- Coat of arms
- Interactive map of Gehren
- Location within Germany Location within Thuringia
- Coordinates: 50°38′55″N 11°0′12″E
- Country: Germany
- State: Thuringia
- District: Ilm-Kreis
- Town: Ilmenau

Area
  - Total: 43.79 km^{2} (16.91 sq mi)
- Elevation: 475 m (1,558 ft)

Population (2016-12-31)
  - Total: 3,782
  - Density: 86.37/km^{2} (223.7/sq mi)
- Time zone: UTC+01:00 (CET)
  - Summer (DST): UTC+02:00 (CEST)
- Postal codes: 98708
- Dialling codes: 036783
- Vehicle registration: IK

Gehren (German pronunciation: [ˈɡeːʁən]) is a town and a former independent municipality in the Ilm-Kreis district, in Thuringia, Germany. It is situated 7 km southeast of Ilmenau. It officially became a town in its own right ('Stadt') in 1855. However, since July 2018, it has been part of the town of Ilmenau. Between 1881 and 1998, Gehren was linked to Ilmenau by a railway.

Schloss Gehren was a former water castle rebuilt in the Renaissance style from 1574 and used as a hunting seat of the Princes of Schwarzburg-Sondershausen until it was destroyed by fire in 1933. Parts of the perimeter wall and three corner bastions survive within a landscape park, and recovered items from the castle are displayed at the Stadt- und Schlossmuseum.

Until 1920, Gehren was the capital of the Amt Gehren in the state of Schwarzburg-Sondershausen.
