= Günther Friedrich Karl I of Schwarzburg-Sondershausen =

Günther Friedrich Karl I
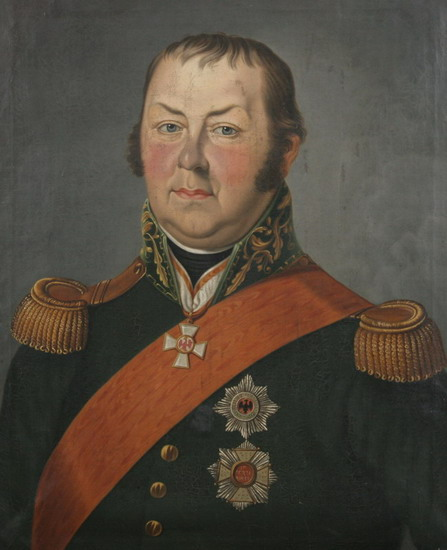

Prince of Schwarzburg-Sondershausen
- Reign: 14 October 1794 – 19 August 1835
- Predecessor: Christian Günther III
- Successor: Günther Friedrich Karl II
- Born: 1 January 1760
- Died: 22 April 1837 (aged 77); Sondershausen
- Spouse: Caroline of Schwarzburg-Rudolstadt (m. 1799)
- Issue: Günther Friedrich Karl II, Prince of Schwarzburg-Sondershausen
- House: House of Schwarzburg
- Father: Christian Günther III of Schwarzburg-Sondershausen
- Mother: Charlotte Wilhelmine of Anhalt-Bernburg

Günther Friedrich Karl I of Schwarzburg-Sondershausen (1760 – 22 April 1837) was the ruling Prince of Schwarzburg-Sondershausen from 1794 until his abdication in 1835.

== Early life ==
He was the eldest child of Prince Christian Günther III and the former Charlotte Wilhelmine of Anhalt-Bernburg (1737–1777). His younger siblings included Catharina Charlotte Friederike Albertine (wife of Prince Frederick Charles Albert of Schwarzburg-Sondershausen), Günther Albert August, Caroline Auguste Albertine (Deaness in Herford), Albertine Wilhelmine Amalie (wife of Duke Ferdinand Frederick of Württemberg) and John Charles Günther.

His paternal grandparents were August I of Schwarzburg-Sondershausen and the former Princess Charlotte Sophie (a daughter of Prince Charles Frederick of Anhalt-Bernburg). His maternal grandfather was Prince Victor Frederick II of Anhalt-Bernburg.

== Career ==
His father succeeded as the ruling Prince of Schwarzburg-Sondershausen after the death of his great-uncle Henry XXXV in 1758, because Henry XXXV was unmarried and had no children, and his grandfather had already died in 1750. Upon Christian Günther III's death on 14 October 1794, Günther Frederick Charles I became ruling Prince of Schwarzburg-Sondershausen.

During his reign, the Holy Roman Empire, which delicately held the German monarchies together, collapsed in 1806. The principality of Schwarzburg-Sondershausen joined the Confederation of the Rhine which was a group of states of Napoleon Bonaparte's First French Empire and fell under Bonaparte's protection until 1813. In 1815, Schwarzburg-Sondershausen joined the German Confederation created in 1815 by the Congress of Vienna.

=== Abdication ===
A deeply unpopular figure, Günther Frederick Charles I ruled as an absolute monarch despite the increasing desire by his subjects for a say in government. His refusal to make any concessions led to a palace revolt spearheaded by his son, Günther Frederick Charles II and known as the Ebeleben Revolution, which resulted in his abdication on 19 August 1835.

== Personal life ==
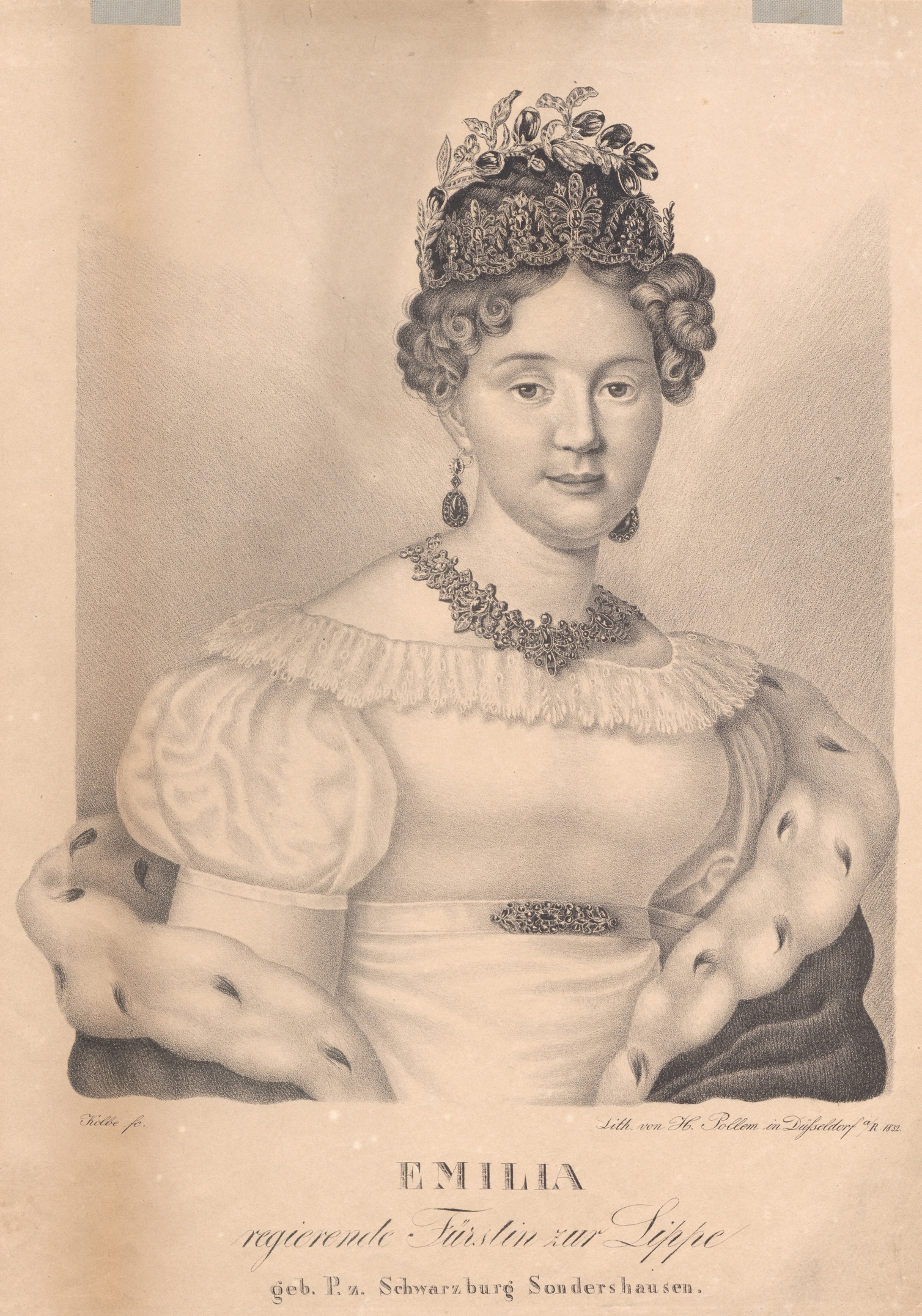
His daughter, Emilie of Schwarzburg-Sondershausen, Princess of Lippe

On 23 June 1799, Günther Frederick Charles I married Caroline of Schwarzburg-Rudolstadt (1774–1854), a daughter of Prince Friedrich Karl of Schwarzburg-Rudolstadt and Friederike Schwarzburg-Rudolstadt. They had two children:

- Emilie Friederike (1800–1867), who married Prince Leopold II of Lippe, the eldest child of Leopold I, the reigning prince of Lippe and Princess Pauline of Anhalt-Bernburg.
- Günther Friedrich Karl II (1801–1889), who married Caroline of Schwarzburg-Rudolstadt and, after her death, Friederike Mathilde zu Hohenlohe-Öhringen (1814–1888), a daughter of August, Prince of Hohenlohe-Öhringen.

After his abdication, Prince Günther lived the rest of his life at his hunting lodge, Jagdschloss "Zum Possen" near Sondershausen, where he died on 22 April 1837 and was likely buried at Schloss Ebeleben in Ebeleben (which is now in the German state of Thuringia).

=== Descendants ===
Through his daughter Princess Emilie, he was a grandfather of nine, including Leopold III, Prince of Lippe (who married Princess Elisabeth of Schwarzburg-Rudolstadt), Woldemar, Prince of Lippe (who married Princess Sophie of Baden), and Alexander, Prince of Lippe.

Günther Friedrich Karl I of Schwarzburg-Sondershausen House of Schwarzburg Born: 14 October 1794 Died: 22 April 1837
Preceded by Christian Günther III	Prince of Schwarzburg-Sondershausen; 1794-1835	Succeeded by Günther Frederick Charles II
