= Henry XXXV of Schwarzburg-Sondershausen =

Henry XXXV
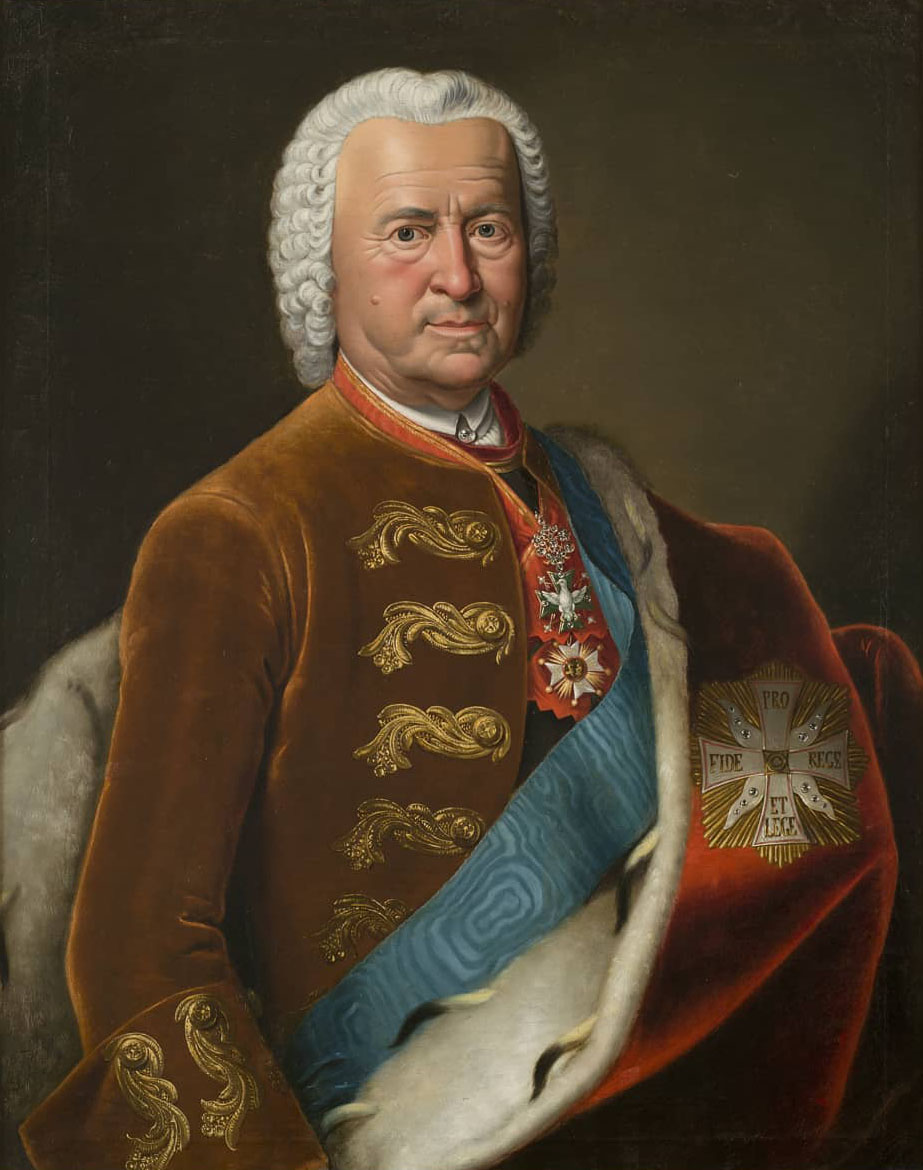
- 18th-century portrait

Prince of Schwarzburg-Sondershausen
- Reign: 28 November 1740 – 6 November 1758
- Predecessor: Günther XLIII
- Successor: Christian Günther III
- Born: 8 November 1689
- Died: 6 November 1758 (aged 68)
- House: Schwarzburg
- Father: Christian William I, Prince of Schwarzburg-Sondershausen
- Mother: Christiane Wilhelmine of Saxe-Weimar

Henry XXXV, Prince of Schwarzburg-Sondershausen, nicknamed: Prince of Diamonds (8 November 1689 – 6 November 1758), was until 1740 Prince of Schwarzburg-Keula (a small apanage) from 1713 to 1740, and the ruling Prince of Schwarzburg-Sondershausen from 1740 until his death.

== Life ==
Prince Henry XXXV was the son of the prince Christian William I of Schwarzburg-Sondershausen (1647-1721) and his wife, Christiane Wilhelmine (1658-1712), the daughter of Duke John Ernest II of Saxe-Weimar.

As a second son, Henry XXXV was, under the terms of an inheritance and succession treaty closed in 1713, not entitled to a share of Schwarzburg-Sondershausen, but only to a small apanage). When he received Schwarzburg-Keula, he was upset with his family, including his siblings, and left the principality. He settled on a country estate in Bürgel and maintained good contacts with his uncle, Duke William Ernest of Saxe-Weimar.

His elder half-brother Günther XLIII died childless in 1740, and Henry XXXV succeeded him as the ruling Prince. He resided in Sondershausen Castle and in the market town of Reichelsheim.

Although the Seven Years' War was raging during his reign, he did little to support his subjects. He was wasteful and loved ostentatious displays of wealth. For example, he owned a collection of diamonds worth half a million Taler, giving him his nickname Prince of Diamonds. He was also a passionate collector of state coaches. He owned 37 coaches, including two magnificent French specimens. His Gold State Coach is now on display in Sondershausen Castle.

Henry XXXV was the most controversial ruler of his dynasty. He was very far from his subjects emotionally, and travelled outside his principality very often. Because of his strained relationship with his siblings, he left his allodial possessions to the Duke of Saxe-Coburg.

He died unmarried in 1758, and was succeeded by Christian Günther III, the eldest son of his younger brother August I.

== See also ==
- House of Schwarzburg
- Schwarzburg-Sondershausen

Henry XXXV of Schwarzburg-Sondershausen House of Schwarzburg Born: 8 November 1689 Died: 6 November 1758
Preceded by Günther XLIII	Prince of Schwarzburg-Sondershausen; 1740-1758	Succeeded by Christian Günther III
