= Princess Marie Gasparine of Saxe-Altenburg =

Princess Marie Gasparine
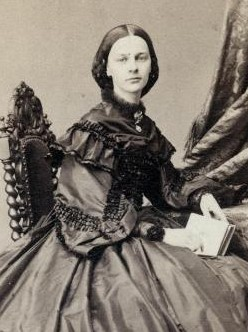
- Marie Gasparine in the 1860s

Princess consort of Schwarzburg-Sondershausen
- Tenure: 17 July 1880 - 28 March 1909
- Born: 28 June 1845; Munich, Kingdom of Bavaria
- Died: 5 July 1930 (aged 85); Sondershausen, Weimar Republic
- Spouse: Charles Gonthier, Prince of Schwarzburg-Sondershausen (m. 1869)
Names
- German: Marie Gasparine Amalie Antoinette Karoline Elisabeth Luise
- House: House of Saxe-Altenburg (by birth); House of Schwarzburg (by marriage)
- Father: Prince Eduard of Saxe-Altenburg
- Mother: Princess Louise Caroline Reuss of Greiz

Princess Marie Gasparine of Saxe-Altenburg (Marie Gasparine Amalie Antoinette Karoline Elisabeth Luise; 28 June 1845 – 5 July 1930) was a daughter of Prince Eduard of Saxe-Altenburg and his wife Princess Louise Caroline Reuss of Greiz. She was the consort of Charles Gonthier, Prince of Schwarzburg-Sondershausen.

== Marriage ==
Marie was considered as a potential spouse for Albert Edward, Prince of Wales, the eldest son and heir of Queen Victoria. A London newspaper speculated (supposedly from "authentic sources") that the prince's choices were limited to seven women, who were all of sufficient royal blood, followers of a Protestant religion, and his age or younger. Some of the other candidates included Marie of the Netherlands, Elisabeth of Wied, Anna of Hesse-Darmstadt, Alexandrine of Prussia, Alexandra of Denmark, Wilhelmine of Württemberg, Catherine of Oldenburg and Augusta of Schleswig-Holstein. Marie was eliminated from this list however, as she was considered "shockingly dressed and always with her most disagreeable mother," and the Prince of Wales ultimately married Alexandra of Denmark in 1863.

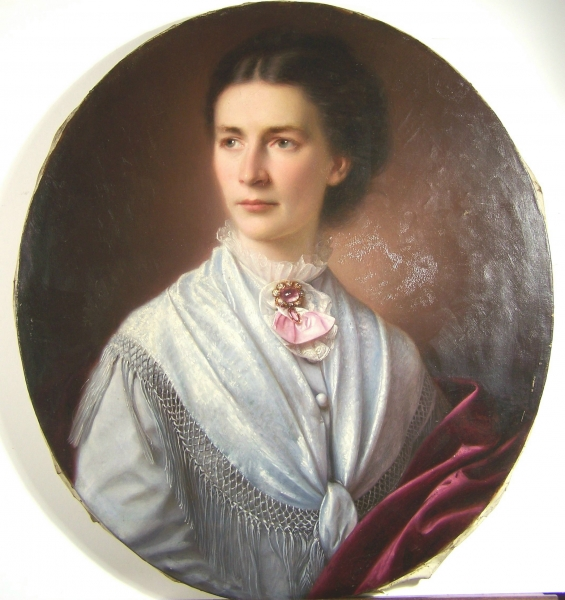
Portrait of Marie Gasparine by Gustav Walter, c. 1870

On 12 June 1869, Marie married Charles Gonthier, Hereditary Prince of Schwarzburg-Sondershausen in Altenburg. Charles succeeded his father on 17 July 1880, and Marie became the Princess of Schwarzburg-Sondershausen. Their failure to have children meant the end of the House of Schwarzburg-Sondershausen. Charles' cousin Günther Victor succeeded him in 1909.

Marie Gasparine died on 5 July 1930 in Sondershausen, Weimar Republic.

Princess Marie Gasparine of Saxe-Altenburg House of Saxe-Altenburg Born: 28 June 1845 Died: 5 July 1930
Regnal titles
Preceded by Princess Mathilde of Hohenlohe-Öhringen	Princess consort of Schwarzburg-Sondershausen; 17 July 1880 – 28 March 1909	Succeeded by Princess Anna Louise of Schönburg-Waldenburg
