= Günther XLIII of Schwarzburg-Sondershausen =

Günther XLIII
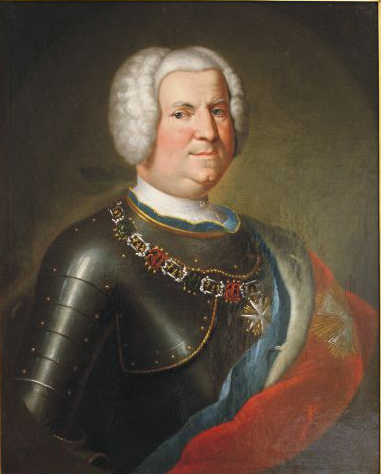

Prince of Schwarzburg-Sondershausen
- Reign: 10 May 1721 – 28 November 1740
- Predecessor: Christian William I
- Successor: Henry XXXV
- Born: 13 August 1678
- Died: 28 November 1740 (aged 62)
- Spouse: Elisabeth Albertine of Anhalt-Bernburg (m. 1712)
- House: Schwarzburg
- Father: Christian William I, Prince of Schwarzburg-Sondershausen
- Mother: Antonie Sybille of Barby-Mühlingen

Günther XLIII, Prince of Schwarzburg-Sondershausen (also known as Günther I; 13 August 1678 – 28 November 1740) was the ruling Prince of Schwarzburg-Sondershausen from 1720 until his death.

== Life ==
Prince Günther XLIII was son of Prince Christian William I (1647-1721) and his wife Princess Antonie Sybille (1641-1684), a daughter of Count Albert Fredrick I of Barby-Mühlingen.

He took up government during his father's the lifetime, and in 1720 and continued as a fair, gentle and pious regent until his death. In 1713, a decree had been issued instituting primogeniture, that is, the Prince's oldest son would be his sole successor, rather than having to share sovereignty with his younger brothers, or dividing the principality.

He made an end to foreign sovereignty over various parts of his principality, thereby increasing its prestige. He built new church in Jechaburg and a Princely House in Sondershausen. His hobby was hunting, and he built a hunting lodge named zum Possen on the Hainleite near Sondershausen. The name of the lodge was derived from a poem by his half-sister Christiane Wilhelmine.

Between 1720 and 1740, he used Schloss Gehren as his main residence.

After he died childless in 1740, his half-brother Henry XXXV inherited the principality.

== Marriage ==
On 2 October 1712 Günther married Elisabeth Albertine (1693-1774), a daughter of Prince Charles Frederick of Anhalt-Bernburg. The marriage was childless.

Günther XLIII of Schwarzburg-Sondershausen House of Schwarzburg Born: 13 August 1678 Died: 28 November 1740
| Preceded by Christian William I | Prince of Schwarzburg-Sondershausen; 1720-1740 | Succeeded by Henry XXXV |
