= Charles Gonthier, Prince of Schwarzburg-Sondershausen =

Charles Gonthier
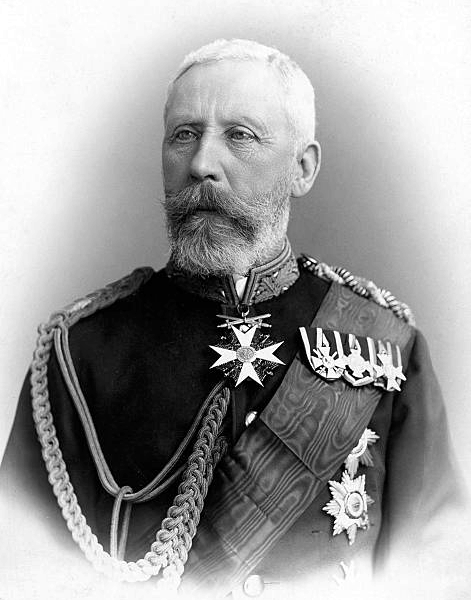
- Charles Gonthier in 1896

Prince of Schwarzburg-Sondershausen
- Reign: 17 July 1880 – 28 March 1909
- Predecessor: Gonthier Frederick Charles II
- Successor: Günther Victor
- Born: 7 August 1830; Arnstadt
- Died: 28 March 1909 (aged 78); Dresden
- Spouse: Princess Marie Gasparine of Saxe-Altenburg (m. 1869)
- House: House of Schwarzburg
- Father: Gonthier Frederick Charles II, Prince of Schwarzburg-Sondershausen
- Mother: Princess Marie of Schwarzburg-Rudolstadt
- Religion: Christianity

Charles Gonthier, Prince of Schwarzburg-Sondershausen (German: Karl Günther, Fürst von Schwarzburg-Sondershausen; 7 August 1830 – 28 March 1909) was the ruler of the principality of Schwarzburg-Sondershausen, a constituent state of the German Empire, and head of the House of Schwarzburg from 17 July 1880 until his death.

== Hereditary Prince ==
Prince Charles Gonthier was born in Arnstadt, the third child of Hereditary Prince Gonthier Frederick Charles and his first wife, Princess Marie of Schwarzburg-Rudolstadt. The death of his elder brother Prince Gonthier in 1833 put Charles Gonthier in direct line for the throne. As such, upon the abdication of his grandfather, Prince Gonthier Frederick Charles I, on 19 August 1835, he became Hereditary Prince and heir apparent to his father, who became Prince Gonthier Frederick Charles II.

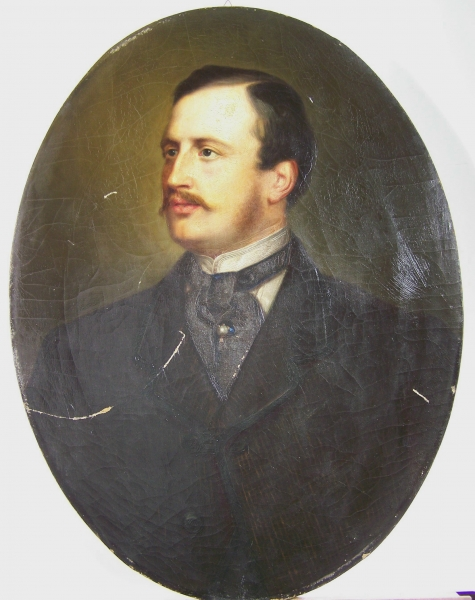
Portrait of Charles Gonthier by an unidentified artist, c. 1870

In 1850 Prince Charles Gonthier enrolled at the University of Bonn to begin his studies in law and literature. Also in 1850, he embarked upon a career in the Prussian Army, being appointed an Oberleutnant. Two years later he was promoted to the rank of Rittmeister before once gaining promotion to the rank Major in 1855.

On 12 June 1869 Prince Charles Gonthier was married in Altenburg to Princess Marie Gasparine of Saxe-Altenburg, Duchess of Saxony, the daughter of Prince Eduard of Saxe-Altenburg.

== Ruling prince ==
On 17 July 1880, following the abdication of his father due to an eye condition, Hereditary Prince Charles Gonthier succeeded him as ruling prince and head of the House of Schwarzburg. During his reign, he made advancements to the education system of the principality, opening a state school and teacher-training facility.

As the marriage of Prince Charles Gonthier was childless, the heir presumptive to the throne was his younger brother, Prince Leopold. In 1890 the two brothers caused a scandal in Germany when they came to blows after Prince Leopold, who desired to marry, took offence to his brother's suggestion that he marry a commoner if no royal woman would agree to marry him.

As his brother remained unmarried and Charles Gonthier childless, the Schwarzburg-Sondershausen branch of the House of Schwarzburg was on the verge of extinction, with no other princes remaining. The princely house of Schwarzburg consisted of two branches, Sondershausen being the senior line and Schwarzburg-Rudolstadt the junior. According to a family pact from 7 September 1713, upon the extinction of one of the branches, the principality would pass to the surviving one. However, as the Rudolstadt branch was also threatened with extinction on 21 April 1896, Prince Charles Gonthier agreed with the remaining dynasts, his brother Prince Leopold and cousin Prince Günther Victor of Schwarzburg-Rudolstadt, that their morganatic relative Prince Sizzo of Leutenberg was to become a member of the princely house with full succession rights. Their decision became law on 1 June 1896.

In 1906 Prince Charles Gonthier suffered a serious injury in a hunting accident. He spent the remaining years of his life confined to a hospital bed and died in a sanatorium in Dresden. As his brother and heir Prince Leopold had died in 1906, Prince Charles Gonthier was succeeded by his cousin, Prince Günther Victor, in whom both Schwarzburg principalities became vested in a personal union.

== Honours and awards ==
- Colonel-in-Chief of the Third Regiment of Thuringian Infantry
- Ascanian duchies: Grand Cross of the Order of Albert the Bear, 2 August 1850
- Kingdom of Bavaria: Knight of the Order of Saint Hubert, 1850
- Saxe-Weimar-Eisenach: Grand Cross of the Order of the White Falcon, 20 July 1861
- Kingdom of Prussia:
  - Knight of the Royal Order of the Crown, 1st Class, 14 June 1864
  - Knight of the Order of the Red Eagle, 3rd Class with Swords, 1866; Grand Cross with Swords on Ring, 5 April 1875
  - Member of Honour of the Johanniter Order, 1884; Knight of Honour, 24 September 1889
  - Knight of the Order of the Black Eagle, 3 November 1892
- Oldenburg: Grand Cross of the House and Merit Order of Duke Peter Friedrich Ludwig, with Golden Crown, 9 June 1869
- Mecklenburg: Grand Cross of the House Order of the Wendish Crown, with Crown in Ore, 25 January 1882
- Württemberg: Grand Cross of the Order of the Württemberg Crown, 1889

== Ancestry ==
Ancestors of Charles Gonthier, Prince of Schwarzburg-Sondershausen

8. Christian Günther III, Prince of Schwarzburg-Sondershausen
4. Günther Frederick Charles I, Prince of Schwarzburg-Sondershausen
9. Princess Wilhelmine of Anhalt-Bernburg
2. Günther Frederick Charles II, Prince of Schwarzburg-Sondershausen
10. Frederick Charles, Prince of Schwarzburg-Rudolstadt
5. Princess Caroline of Schwarzburg-Rudolstadt
11. Princess Frederica of Schwarzburg-Rudolstadt
1. Charles Günther, Prince of Schwarzburg-Sondershausen
12. Frederick Charles, Prince of Schwarzburg-Rudolstadt (= 10)
6. Prince Charles Günther of Schwarzburg-Rudolstadt
13. Princess Frederica of Schwarzburg-Rudolstadt (= 11)
3. Princess Marie of Schwarzburg-Rudolstadt
14. Frederick V, Landgrave of Hesse-Homburg
7. Landgravine Louise Ulrica of Hesse-Homburg
15. Landgravine Caroline of Hesse-Darmstadt

Charles Gonthier, Prince of Schwarzburg-Sondershausen House of Schwarzburg Born: 7 August 1830 Died: 28 March 1909
Regnal titles
Preceded by Gonthier Frederick Charles II	Prince of Schwarzburg-Sondershausen; 17 July 1880 – 28 March 1909	Succeeded by Günther Victor
