= Sondershausen Palace =

Historical palace in Thuringia, Germany

Coordinates: 51.3716°N 10.8701°E

From an architectural and art historical point of view Sondershausen Palace can be considered one of the most important palace complexes in Thuringia. It is an irregular four-wing complex. With its imposing silhouette the former Schwarzburg residence dominates today's district town of Sondershausen in the Kyffhäuserkreis district.

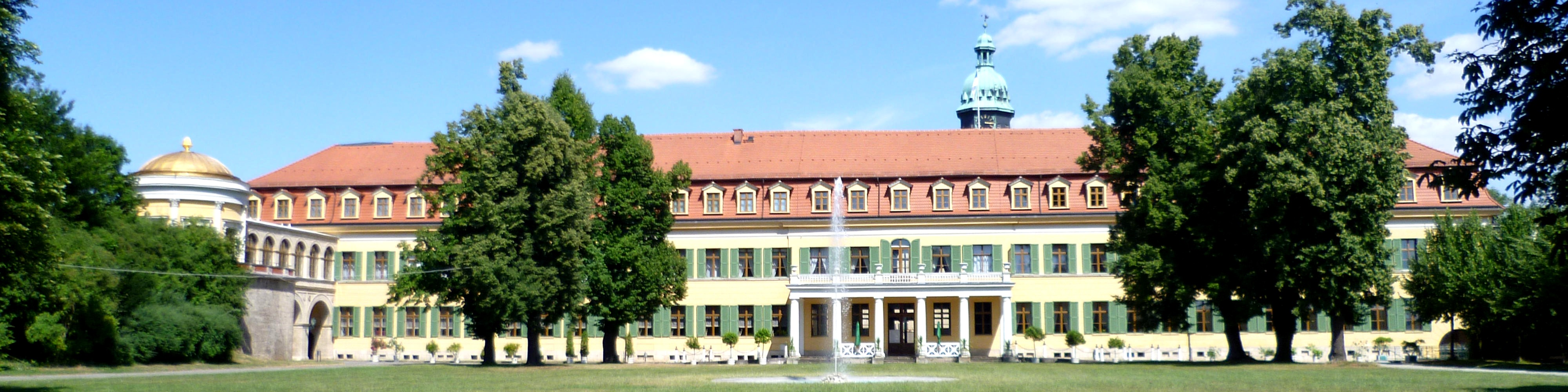
the west wing of the Palace

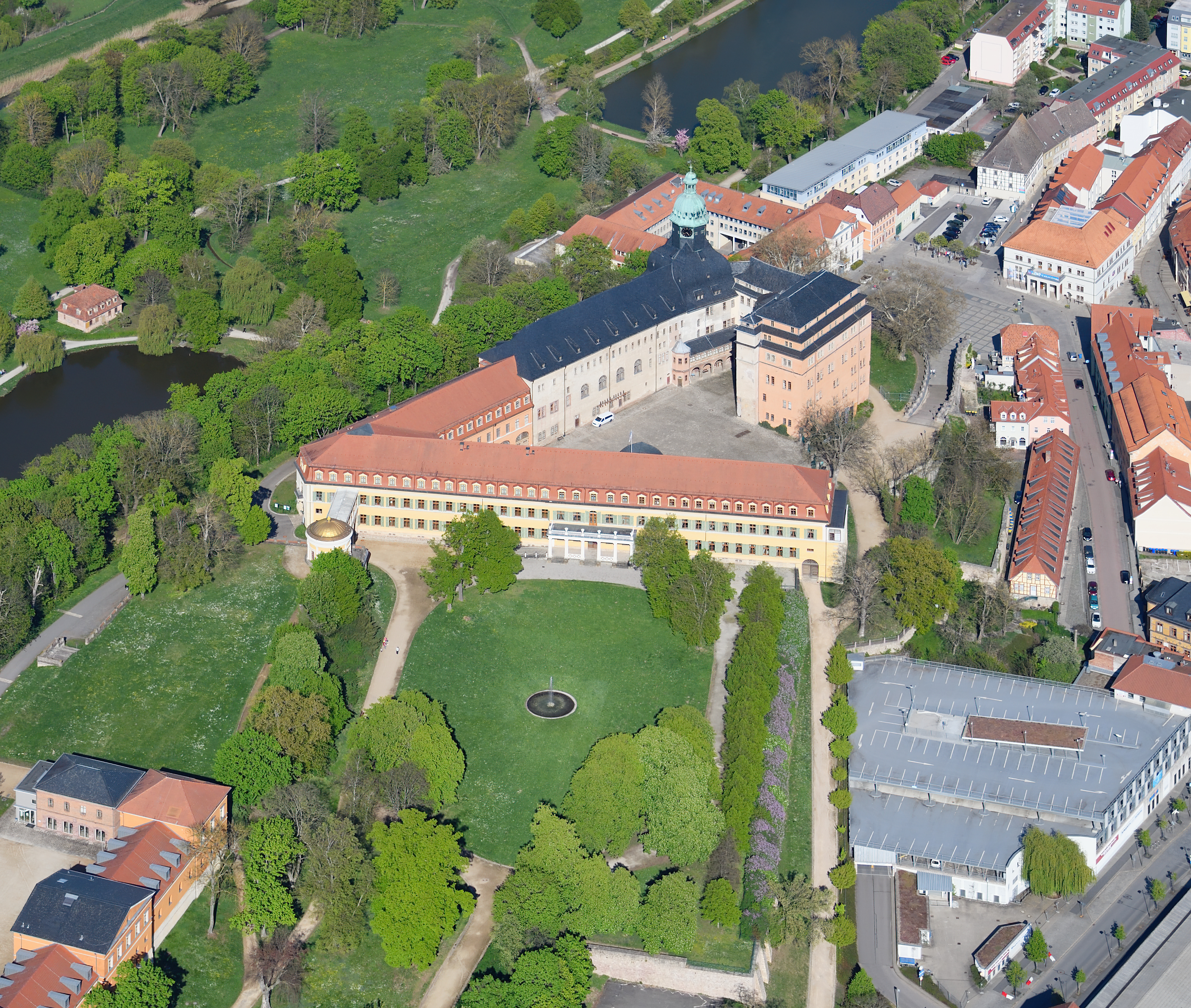
Aerial view of the palace

== History ==
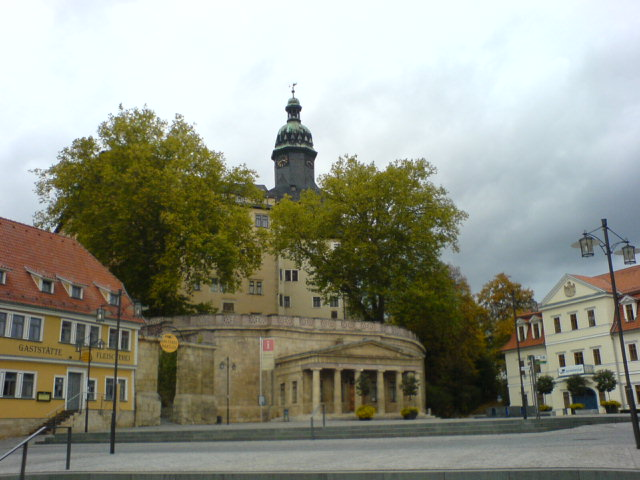
Sondershausen Palace, view from the marketplace with the guardhouse, called "Alte Wache"

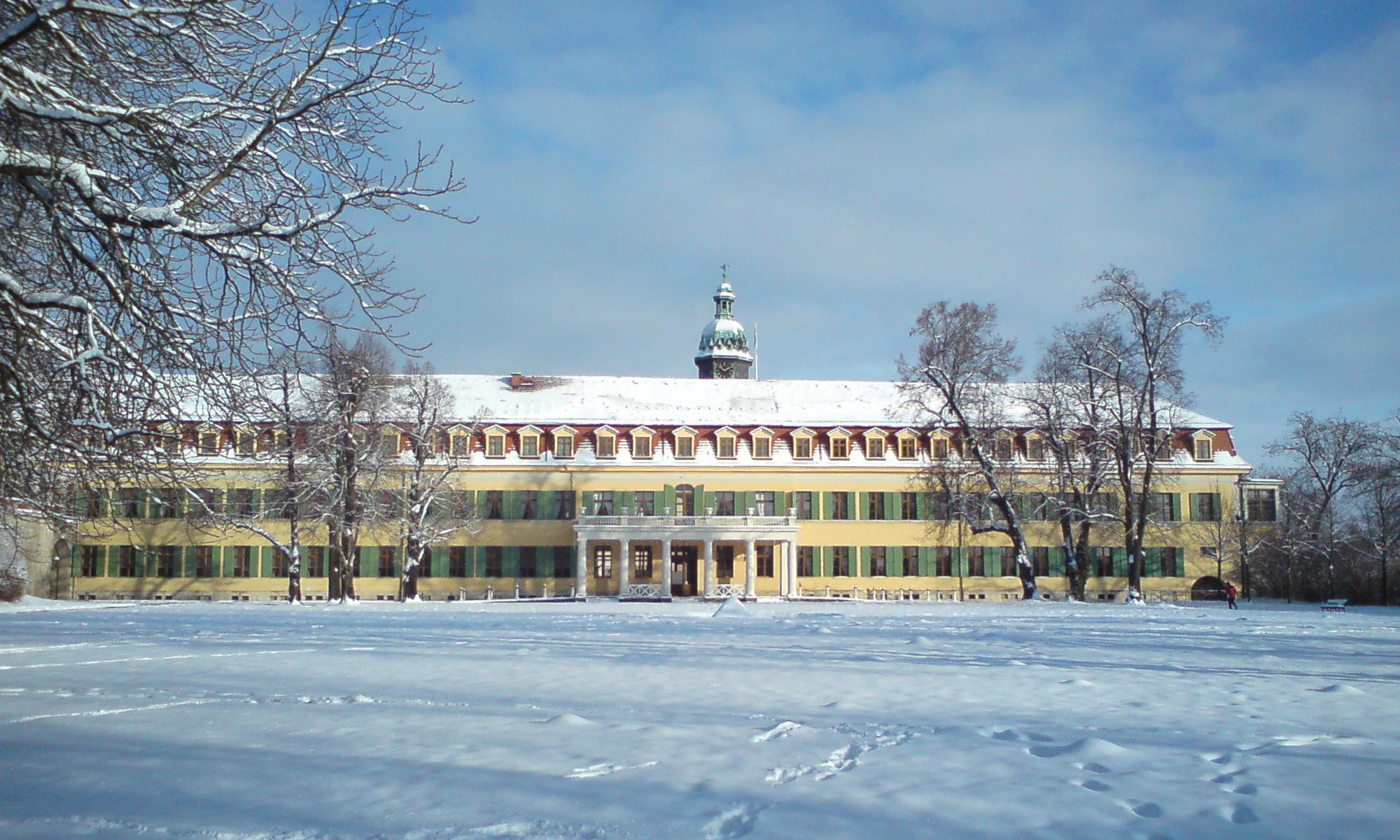
the west wing

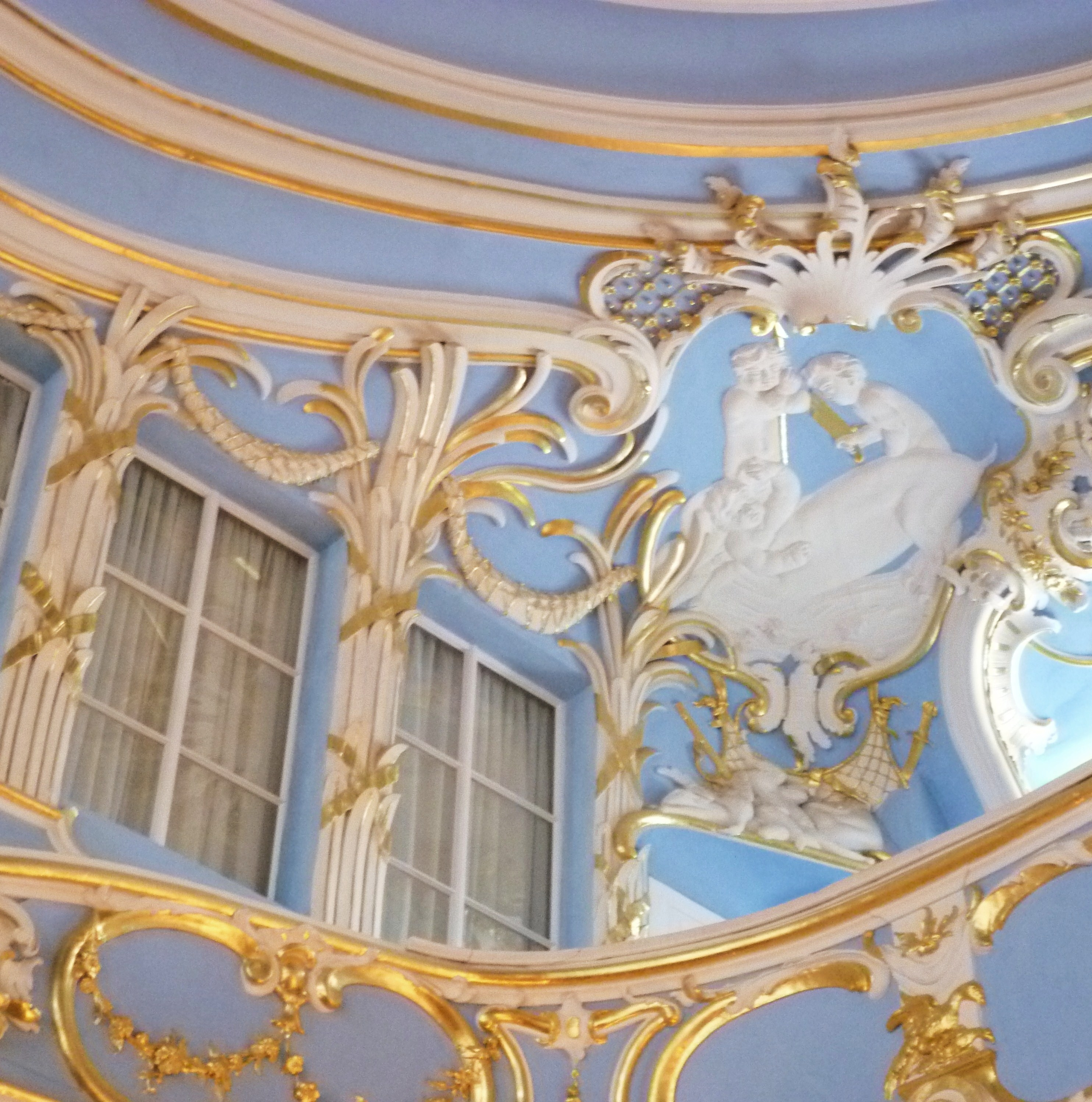
Blue Hall

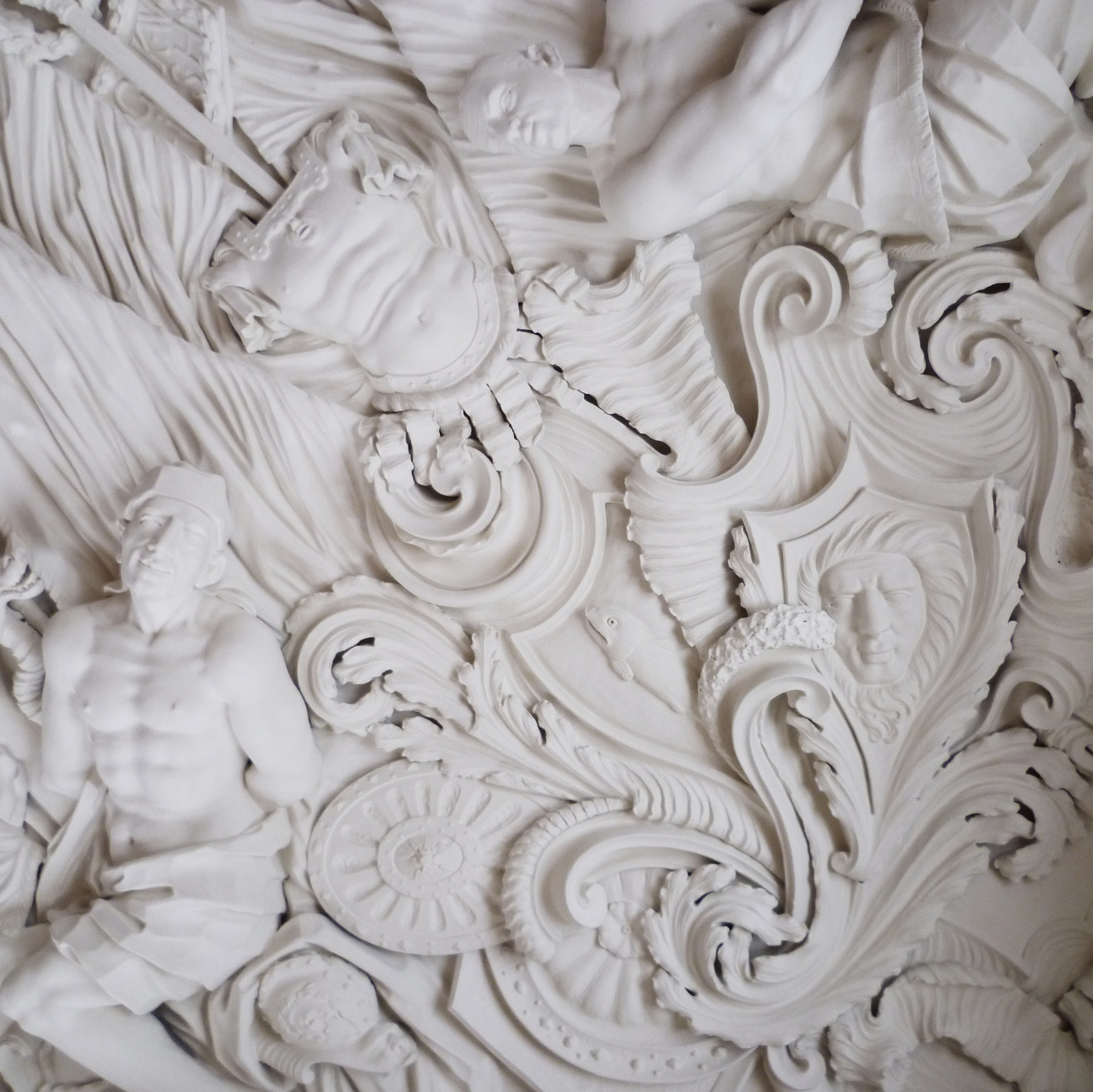
Detail of the Giant's Hall

There is evidence that some of the oldest building fabric of the castle dating from the end of the 13th century can be attributed to the Counts of Hohnstein.

The remaining tower was integrated under Count Günther XL of Schwarzburg when the Renaissance palace, consisting of the south, east and old north wings, was built between the 1530s and the 1550s.

Under Prince Christian William I of Schwarzburg-Sondershausen, who reigned between 1666 and 1720, a busy building activity started in the 1680s. The three Renaissance wings of the palace were altered and enlarged in the Baroque style.

In 1764, during the reign of Prince Christian Günther III of Schwarzburg-Sondershausen, the new west and north rococo wings were started under supervision of the Quedlinburg architect Johann Heinrich Breit and the former architect from Brunswick, Martin Peltier. At that time the palace received its final architectural layout of an irregular four-wing complex.

When Prince Günther Friedrich Carl II, who reigned from 1835 to 1880, engaged Carl Scheppig, a pupil of Karl Friedrich Schinkel, in 1836, his aim was to give most parts of the entire palace complex a completely new appearance. Financial constraints, however, limited this project to redesigning the eastern place area towards the market (palace terrace, guard house and stairs between 1837 and 1839), to rebuilding the rococo wings in the neo-classical style (1846–1851) and to erecting the new stables (1847–1849).

As the last architectural undertaking, a two-storey gallery, connecting the tower and the east and south wings, was erected between 1914 and 1915.

== Historical Rooms ==
=== The Blue Hall ===
Opened in 1760 by Prince Christian Günther, the hall in the Rococo style extends over the two upper storeys and has galleries on both long sides. The dominant colors are blue and white; they reflect the state colors of Schwarzburg-Sondershausen. In this hall there are traces of traditional Baroque tectonics as well as transitional elements from Baroque to Neoclassicism and finally Rococo ornaments typical of the time. The large oval ceiling painting depicts the Callisto myth.

=== The Giants' Hall ===
The construction of the hall dates back to Count (later Prince) Christian Wilhelm of Schwarzburg-Sondershausen between 1680 and 1700. It is decorated in the style of the high Baroque with 22 ceiling paintings about scenes from Ovid's "Metamorphoses" and 16 larger-than-life figures in the round made of stucco and represents Greek gods. The fact that this hall was originally designed during the Renaissance explains the unusual proportions (26.6 x 13.2 metres) and the relatively low ceiling of 4.8 metres.

=== The Stone Room ===
This room has preserved original decorations from the 1770s. The name is derived from the wall covering consisting of small cut, polished and glazed tiles of plaster and limestone. It is known as the "Amber Room" of Sondershausen.

== Palace today ==
Since 1994, the former residence of the princes of Schwarzburg-Sondershausen is the property of the Palace, Castle and Gardens Trust of Thuringia. Today it houses the Palace Museum of Sondershausen and the district school of music, called Carl-Schroeder-Konservatorium.

== Sources ==
- Heimatkunde für das Fürstentum Schwarzburg-Sondershausen 1920, Editor: F. Lammert
- Heimatkunde für die Bewohner des Fürstenthums Schwarzburg-Sondershausen, Editor: Apfelstedt
- Aus Sondershausens Vergangenheit Bd. 1, Editor: Günther Lutze
- Liebeserklärung an eine Stadt – Sondershausen, 2000; Editor: Bildarchiv Röttig
