= Schwarzburg-Sondershausen =

German Principality 1599–1918

County of Schwarzburg-Sondershausen (1599–1711) Grafschaft Schwarzburg-Sondershausen Principality of Schwarzburg-Sondershausen (1711–1918) Fürstentum Schwarzburg-Sondershausen
- 1599–1918
- Flag Coat of arms

- Schwarzburg-Sondershausen within the German Empire

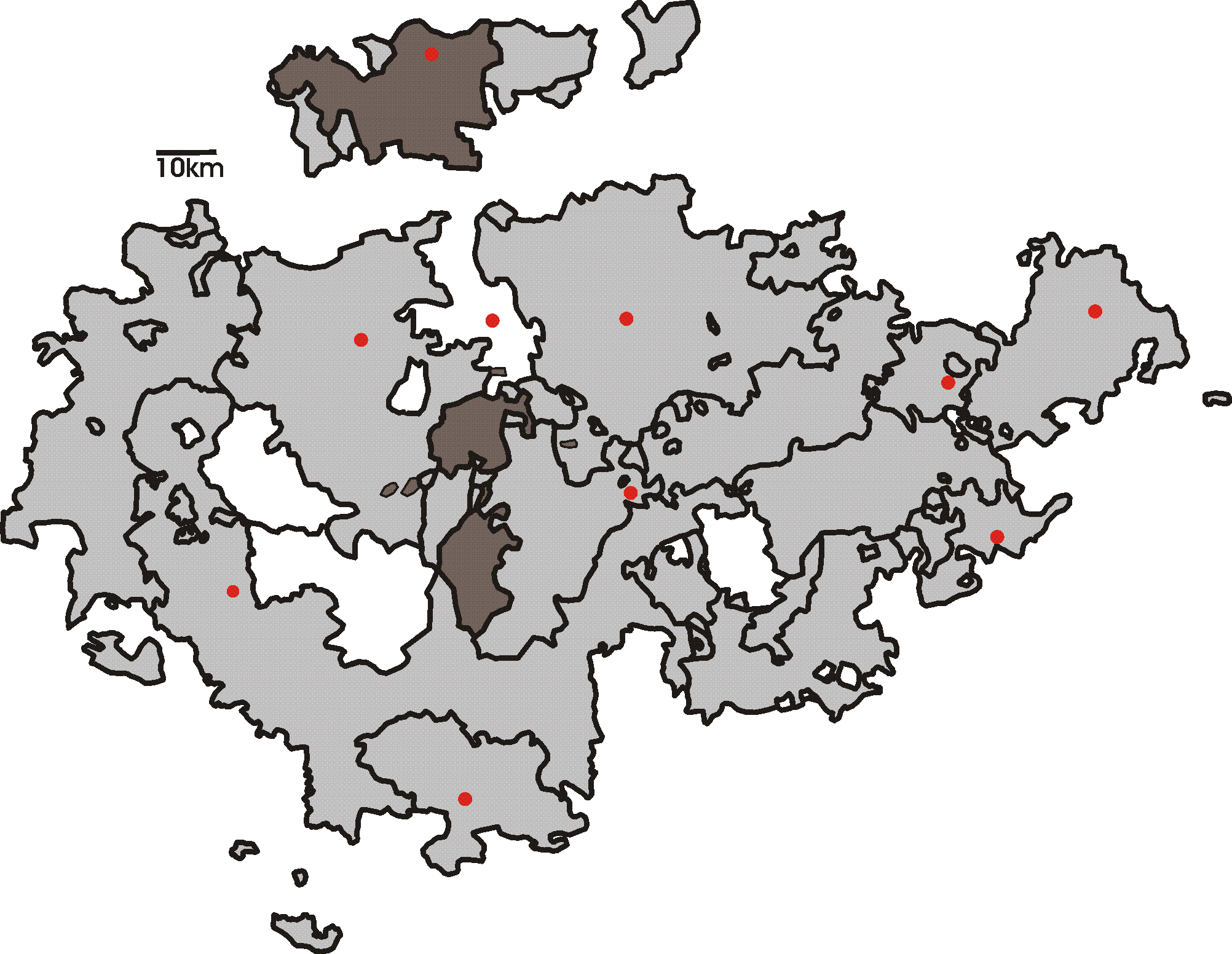
- Status: State of the Holy Roman Empire, State of the Confederation of the Rhine, State of the German Confederation, State of the North German Confederation, State of the German Empire, State of the Weimar Republic
- Capital: Sondershausen
- Government: Principality
- Prince
  - 1697–1716: Anton Günther II (first)
  - 1909–1918: Günther Victor (last)
- Historical era: Middle Ages
  - Partitioned from Schwarzburg: 1599
  - Raised to Principality: 1697
  - German Revolution: 1918
  - Merged into Thuringia: 1920
Preceded by	Succeeded by
County of Schwarzburg	Free State of Schwarzburg-Sondershausen

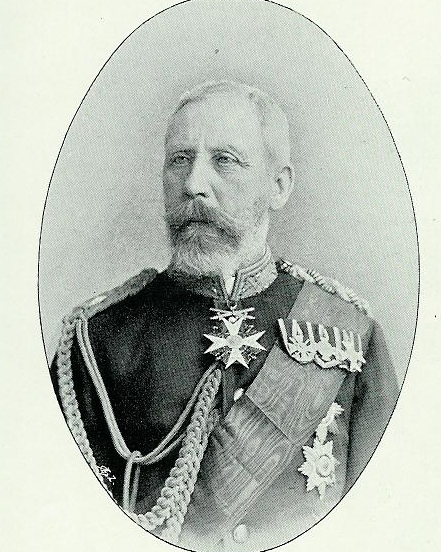
Karl Günther, the last Prince of Schwarzburg-Sondershausen

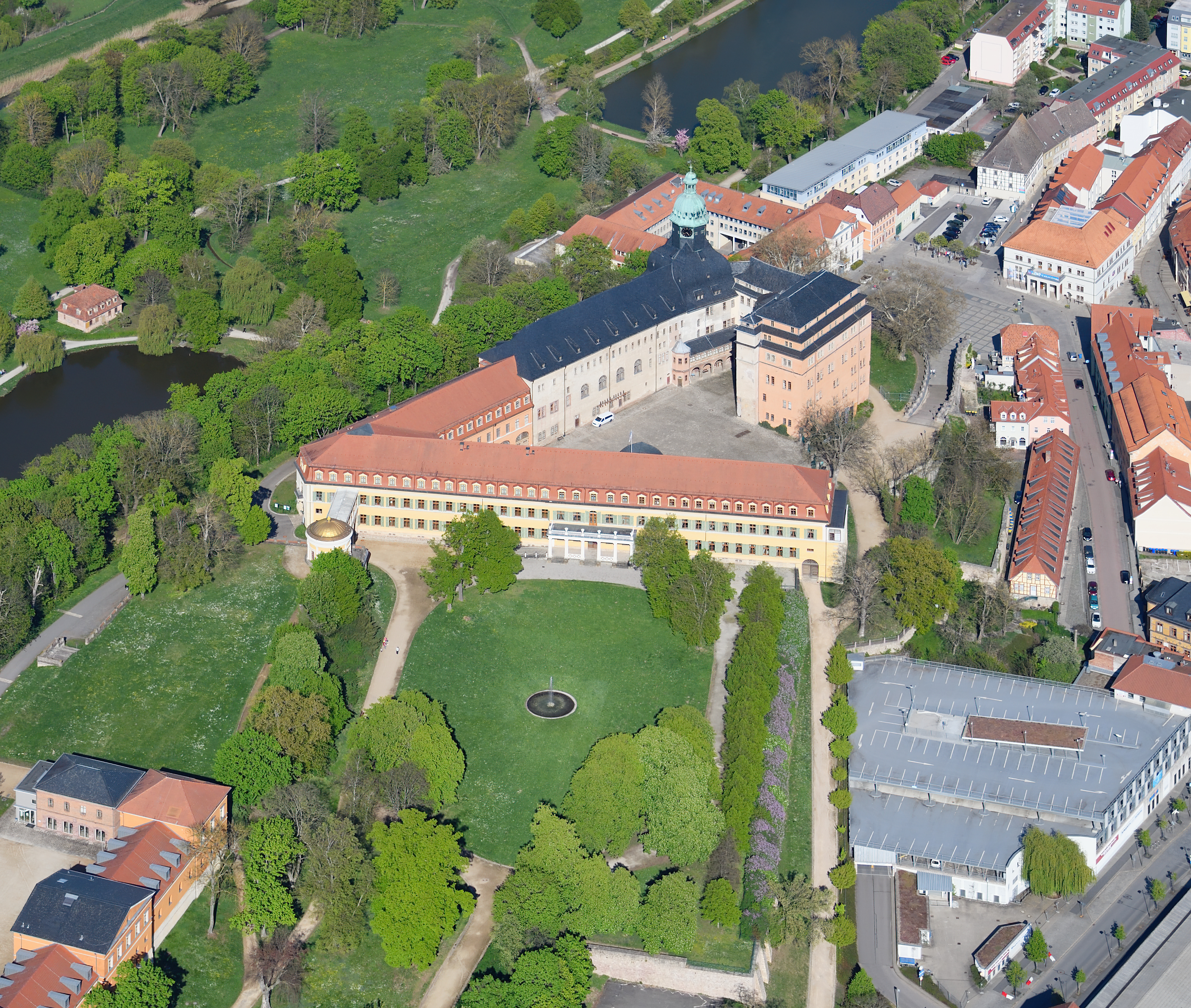
The castle at Sondershausen

Schwarzburg-Sondershausen was a small principality in Germany, in the present day state of Thuringia, with its capital at Sondershausen.

== History ==
Schwarzburg-Sondershausen was a county (earldom) until 1697. In that year, it became a principality, which lasted until the fall of the German monarchies in 1918, during the German Revolution of 1918–1919. After the German Revolution, it became the Free State of Schwarzburg-Sondershausen and joined the Weimar Republic as a constituent state. In 1920, it joined with other small states in the area to form the new state of Thuringia.

Schwarzburg-Sondershausen had an area of 862 km^{2} (333 sq. mi.) and a population of 85,000 (1905). Towns placed in the state were: Arnstadt, Sondershausen, Gehren, Langewiesen, Großbreitenbach, Ebeleben, Großenehrich, Greußen and Plaue.

== Rulers of Schwarzburg-Sondershausen, 1552–1918 ==
=== Counts of Schwarzburg-Sondershausen ===
- 1552–1586 John Günther I
- 1586–1631 Günther XLII, with Anton Henry, John Günther II and Christian Günther I
- 1631–1638 Günther XLII, with Anton Henry and Christian Günther I
- 1638–1642 Günther XLII, with Christian Günther I
- 1642–1643 Günther XLII, with Anton Günther I
- 1643–1666 Anton Günther I
- 1666–1697 Christian William, with Anton Günther II

Raised to Principality in 1697

=== Princes of Schwarzburg-Sondershausen ===
- 1697–1716: Anton Günther II
- 1697 – 10 May 1721: Christian William
- 10 May 1721 – 28 November 1740: Günther XLIII
- 28 November 1740 – 6 November 1758: Henry XXXV
- 6 November 1758 – 14 October 1794: Christian Günther III
- 14 October 1794 – 19 August 1835: Günther Friedrich Karl I
- 19 August 1835 – 17 July 1880: Günther Friedrich Karl II
- 17 July 1880 – 28 March 1909: Karl Günther

United under Prince Günther Victor of Schwarzburg-Rudolstadt

- 28 March 1909 – November 1918: Günther Victor

=== Villages with more than 2000 people ===
Village	Inhabitants December 1, 1910
Arnstadt	17,841
Sondershausen	7759
Langewiesen	3814
Greußen	3348
Großbreitenbach	3255
Gehren	2917
Geschwenda	2291

== See also ==
- House of Schwarzburg
