= Christian Günther III of Schwarzburg-Sondershausen =

Christian Günther III

Prince of Schwarzburg-Sondershausen
- Reign: 6 November 1758 – 14 October 1794
- Predecessor: Henry XXXV
- Successor: Günther Friedrich Karl I
- Born: 24 June 1736
- Died: 14 October 1794 (aged 58)
- Spouse: Charlotte Wilhelmine of Anhalt-Bernburg (m. 1760; died 1777)
- Issue: Günther Friedrich Karl I, Prince of Schwarzburg-Sondershausen
- House: House of Schwarzburg
- Father: August I of Schwarzburg-Sondershausen
- Mother: Charlotte Sophie of Anhalt-Bernburg

Christian Günther III of Schwarzburg-Sondershausen (24 June 1736 – 14 October 1794) was the ruling Prince of Schwarzburg-Sondershausen from 1758 until his death. Some authors call him Prince Christian Günther I, because he was the first ruler of Schwarzburg-Sondershausen named Christian Günther who held the title of Prince. Others call Christian Günther III, because there were two earlier Counts of Schwarzburg-Sondershausen by that name.

== Early life ==
Christian Günther III was the son of Prince August I of Schwarzburg-Sondershausen (1691–1750) and his wife Princess Charlotte Sophie (1696–1762), a daughter of Prince Charles Frederick of Anhalt-Bernburg.

== Career ==
He succeeded as the ruling Prince of Schwarzburg-Sondershausen after the death of his uncle Henry XXXV in 1758, because Henry XXXV was unmarried and had no children, and Christian Günther III's father had already died in 1750.

He had to deal with a number of problems when he inherited the principality. Some people were abusing their power, and the country suffered from the consequences of the Seven Years' War. Although he was only 22 years old, he managed to solve these problems with unwearying zeal and vigorous energy.

He was considered a frugal ruler and father. He used the money he saved to construct some important buildings. He expanded his residence Sondershausen Palace by extending the north wing and added the famous "Blue Hall" to the west wing. He also built very large so-called "domain" buildings in Allmenhausen and Sondershausen and the watchtower on the top of Mount Possen, in the Hainleite range. His favourite castle was Ebeleben Castle, in Ebeleben, where he grew up. He expanded this castle, and completely overhauled the adjoining park. The statues, waterfalls, fountains and flowers made it a renowned park for a long time.

== Personal life ==
On 4 February 1760, Christian Günther III married his first cousin Charlotte Wilhelmine (1737–1777), a daughter of Prince Victor Frederick II of Anhalt-Bernburg. They had the following children:

- Günther Frederick Charles I (1760–1837), his successor who married Caroline of Schwarzburg-Rudolstadt, a daughter of Prince Friedrich Karl of Schwarzburg-Rudolstadt, in 1799.
- Catharina Charlotte Friederike Albertine (1761–1801), who married Prince Frederick Charles Albert of Schwarzburg-Sondershausen in 1790.
- Günther Albert August (1767–1833).
- Caroline Auguste Albertine (1769–1819), Deaness in Herford.
- Albertine Wilhelmine Amalie (1771–1829), who married Duke Ferdinand Frederick of Württemberg, the fifth son of Frederick II Eugene, Duke of Württemberg and his wife, Princess Friederike of Brandenburg-Schwedt (niece of Frederick the Great), in 1795. They divorced in 1801.
- John Charles Günther (1772-1842)

He died in 1794, at the age of 59, and was succeeded by his eldest son, Günther Frederick Charles I.

Christian Günther III of Schwarzburg-Sondershausen House of Schwarzburg Born: 24 June 1736 Died: 14 October 1794
Preceded by Henry XXXV	Prince of Schwarzburg-Sondershausen; 1758–1794	Succeeded by Günther Frederick Charles I
