= Annaberg =

Annaberg may refer to:

== Austria ==
- Annaberg, Lower Austria
- Annaberg-Lungötz, Salzburg, also known as Annaberg im Lammertal

== Germany ==
- Annaberg-Buchholz, capital city of the Erzgebirgskreis district of Saxony
- Annaberg district, a former district of Saxony

== Poland ==
- Chałupki (Racibórz County), a village in Silesia that is known as Annaberg in German
- Góra Świętej Anny, a village in Silesia that is known as Annaberg in German
- Góra Świętej Anny (hill), known as Annaberg in German

== U.S. Virgin Islands ==
- Annaberg, Saint John, U.S. Virgin Islands
  - Annaberg Historic District
- Annaberg, Saint Croix, U.S. Virgin Islands

== See also ==
- Battle of Annaberg
- Annaburg
- Annabergite
