= Traugott =

Name list

Traugott is both a surname and a male given name of German origin. The name first appeared in the 17th century and is hardly used today. Its meaning is 'trust in god'. Notable people with the name include:

== As a surname ==
- Elizabeth C. Traugott (born 1939), emeritus professor at Stanford University
- Leah Traugott (1924–2018), American watercolorist and educator
- Michael Traugott, American political scientist, communication studies researcher, and political pundit
- Peter Traugott (born 1965), American television producer, President of Television at Brillstein-Grey Entertainment
- Tristan Traugott (born 1997), South African cricketer
- Wolfdietrich Traugott (born 1939), Austrian rower

== As a middle name ==
- Carl Traugott Beilschmied (1793–1848), German pharmacist and botanist
- Johann Traugott Leberecht Danz (1769–1851), German theologian and church historian
- Christian Friedrich Traugott Duttenhofer (1778–1846), German engraver
- Friedrich Traugott Friedemann (1793–1853), German educator, philologist and archivist
- Johann Samuel Traugott Gehler (1751–1795), German lawyer and physicist
- Karl Christian Traugott Friedemann Goebel (1794–1851), German pharmacist and chemist
- Wilhelm Traugott Krug (1770–1842), German philosopher and writer
- Friedrich Traugott Kützing (1807–1893), German pharmacist, botanist and phycologist
- Paul Traugott Meissner (1778–1864), Austrian chemist
- Frederick Traugott Pursh (1774–1820), German-American botanist
- Karl Traugott Queisser (1800–1846), played trombone and viola in the Gewandhaus Orchestra under Felix Mendelssohn
- Hermann Traugott Rüdisühli (1864–1944),) was a Swiss painter, in the Rüdisühli family of artists
- Karl Christoph Traugott Tauchnitz (1761–1836), German printer and bookseller
- Karl August Traugott Vogt (1808–1869), German Protestant theologian
- Friedrich Traugott Wahlen (1899–1985), Swiss politician

== As a given name ==
- Traugott Wilhelm Boehm (1836–1917), schoolmaster, founder of the German School in Hahndorf, South Australia
- Traugott Buhre (1929–2009), German actor
- Traugott Maximilian Eberwein (1775–1831), German composer and conductor
- Traugott Glöckler (born 1944), German athlete
- Traugott Herr (1890–1976), German general of Panzer troops who served during World War II
- Traugott Kempas (1919–1945), highly decorated Major in the Wehrmacht during World War II
- Traugott Lawler (born 1937), medievalist scholar, expert on William Langland, emeritus professor of English at Yale University
- Traugott Märki, Swiss footballer
- Traugott Oberer (1924–1974), Swiss footballer
- Traugott Ochs (1854–1919), German court Kapellmeister, organist and conductor
- Traugott Rudolph
- Traugott Konstantin Oesterreich (1880–1949), German religious psychologist and philosopher
- Traugott Sandmeyer (1854–1922), Swiss chemist who discovered the Sandmeyer reaction in 1884
- Traugott von Sauberzweig (1863–1920), Prussian Lieutenant General in the German Army during World War I
- Traugott Bernhard Zwar (1876–1947), Australian academic, army medical officer and surgeon

== See also ==
- Staub-Traugott Phenomenon (or Staub-Traugott Effect) is the premise that a normal subject fed glucose will rapidly return to normal levels of blood glucose after an initial spike, and will see improved reaction to subsequent glucose feedings
