= Annaberg, United States Virgin Islands =

Annaberg, United States Virgin Islands may refer to:

- Annaberg, Saint Croix, United States Virgin Islands
- Annaberg, Saint John, United States Virgin Islands
