= Annaberg, U.S. Virgin Islands =

Annaberg, U.S. Virgin Islands may refer to:

- Annaberg, Saint Croix, U.S. Virgin Islands
- Annaberg, Saint John, U.S. Virgin Islands
