= Eduard Stein =

German conductor

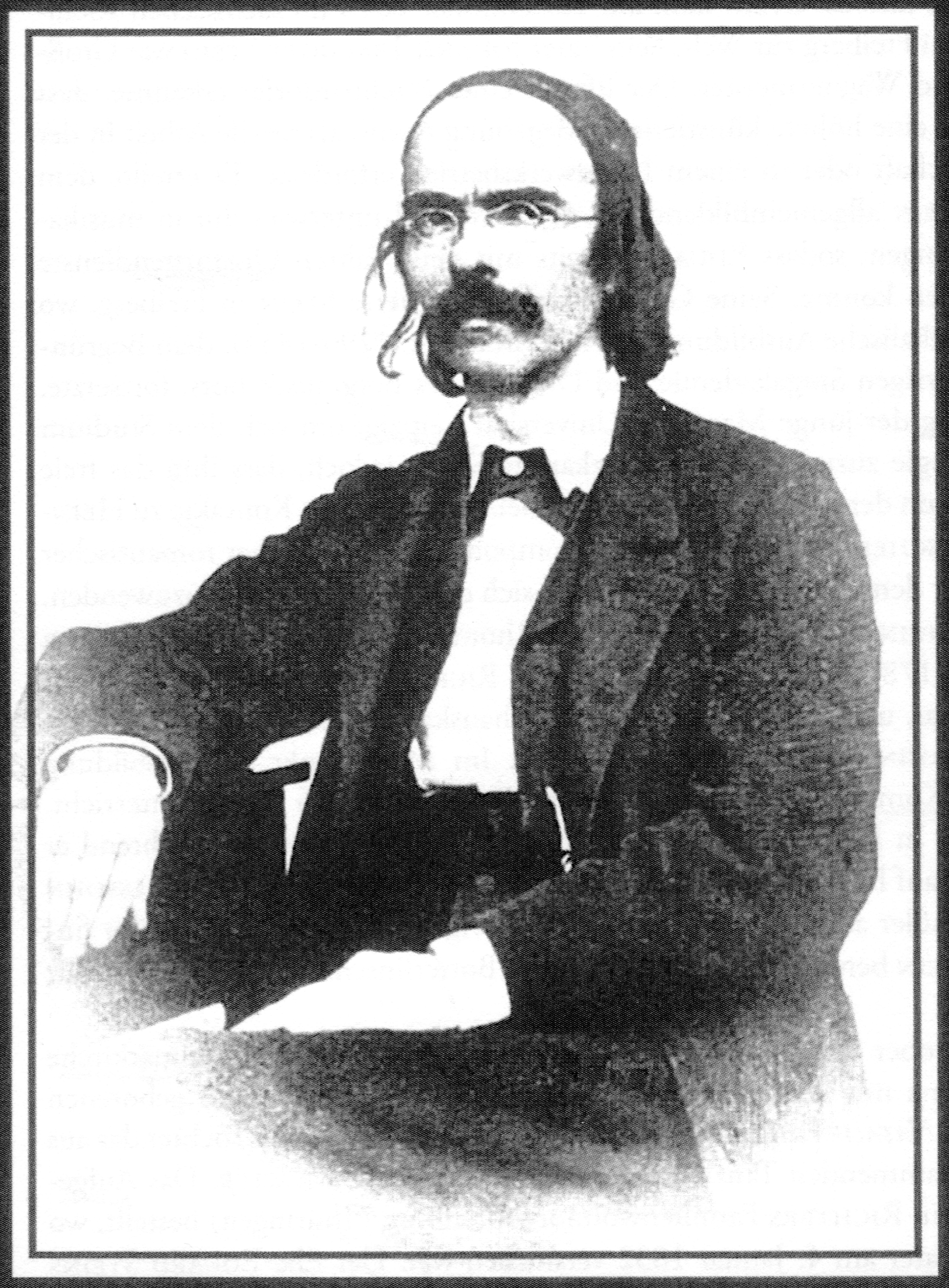
Hofkapellmeister Eduard Stein (1818–1864)

Eduard Stein (16 October 1818 – 16 March 1864) was a German conductor, music director and Prince's court conductor of the (later so called) Loh-Orchester Sondershausen in the residence town of the principality of Schwarzburg-Sondershausen.

== Life ==
=== Childhood and education ===
Stein was born in 1818, the son of the farmer Johann Traugott Stein, in Kleinschirma near Freiberg in Saxony.

He attended the grammar school in Freiberg, where his musical inclination was also encouraged by August Ferdinand Anacker, the founder of the Singakademie and conductor of the Bergmusikchor, which had previously been discovered by the local pastor. He then began to study theology at the Leipzig University, but under the influence of Heinrich Marschner and Felix Mendelssohn Bartholdy he abandoned this in favour of musical training.

=== Professional career ===
After dropping out of university and completing a musical education, Stein was music director of a travelling theatre company in Bautzen until 1845.

He then went to Frankfurt (Oder) and first became director of the opera. Later he worked as the conductor of the symphony concerts, the Liedertafel and the Singakademie.

In response to his application for the position of Fürstlicher Hofkapellmeister in Sondershausen, he was entrusted with this post in January 1853; he held it until his death on 16 March 1864 at the age of 45. During his time in Sondershausen he also taught, among others, the later Scottish conductor and composer Alexander Mackenzie.

=== Family ===
In Altenburg, Stein met Eleonore Natalie Richter (b. 1818), the daughter of a Dresden dance teacher, who came from Annaberg. (Note: There are several places in Germany and elsewhere called Annaberg. It is unclear which this one was.) On 4 October 1842, they married in Bautzen. The marriage produced a son and a daughter, whose traces, however, disappear after Eduard's death.

== Creating in Sondershausen ==
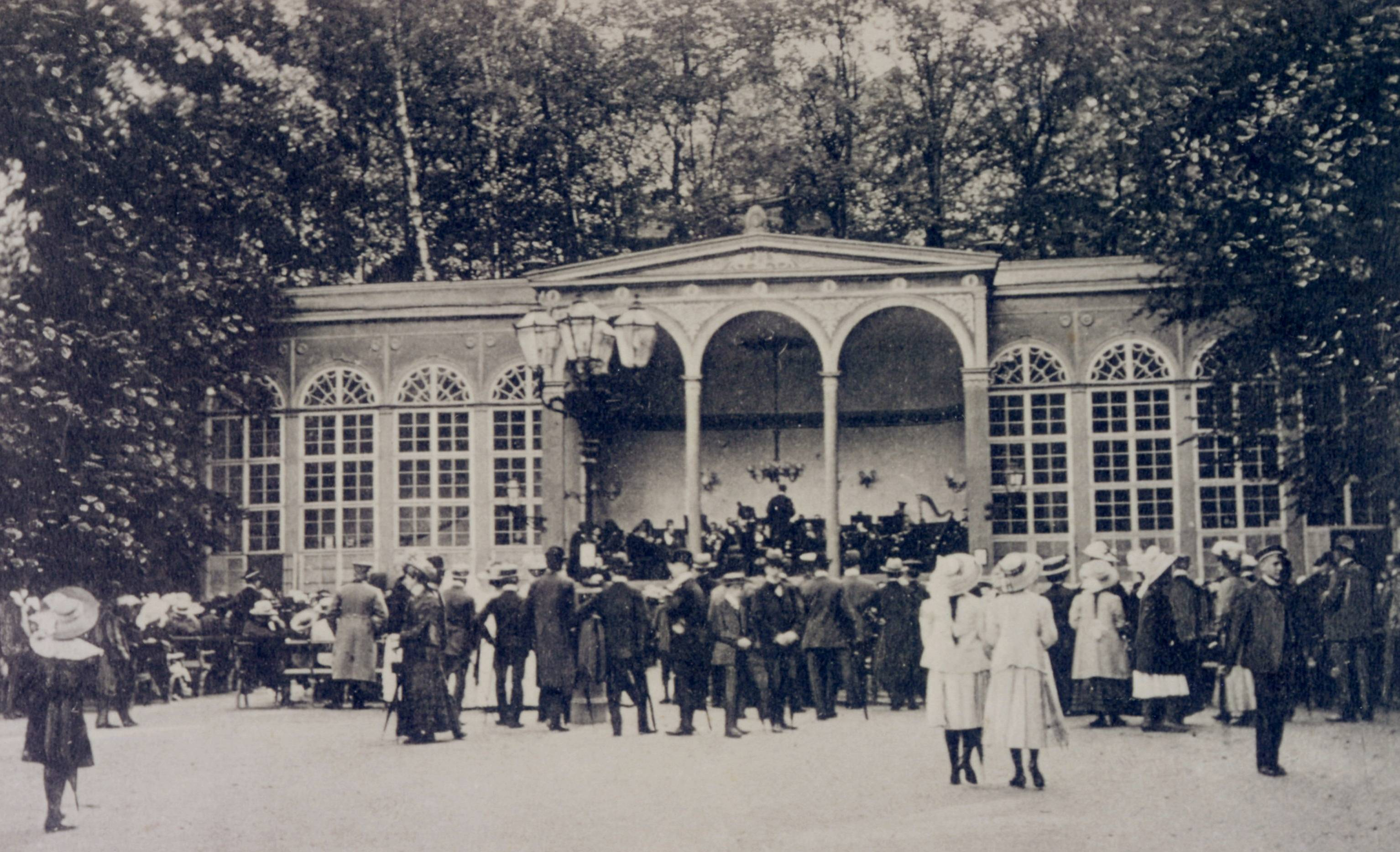
The ancient Loh-Halle at Lohplatz in Sondershausen

As a conductor, Stein succeeded in raising the Hofkapelle, which had been developed into a symphony orchestra by Gottfried Herrmann, to the qualitative level of important orchestras of musically influential German centres. Very early on, he introduced the so-called Zukunftsmusik (also called New German School) of Franz Liszt and Richard Wagner, which was still very unusual at the time. In 1856, he tried to get the public in the mood for the innovations by advertising them in the Deutsch.

An early performance of Lohengrin on 26 March 1858 gained from Laue an enthusiastic review that prompted Wagner to write to Stein on 3 May:

Dear Herr Kapellmeister!

I have just read a report on your performance of my Lohengrin, and I see from it that I was so happy to meet in you one of those rare friends whose beautiful and uplifting participation is the only thing that does not make me regret having presented my works to the public, where they so often and usually experience the fate of maltreatment and ridicule. Encounters such as yours are the only things that console me about my fate, which without them would have to be one of the most deplorable in existence. Greet Mr. Pichon - despite his misfortune at the first performance - most sincerely, and thank him on my behalf for having drawn my attention with beautiful warmth some time ago to your great devotion to my work. [...] To your honoured orchestra, as well as to the singers unknown to me, who distinguished themselves so much in Lohengrin, my greatest thanks and best regards! Hopefully I will also see you one day: then let my handshake complete what I am saying today in brief, but with emphatic, heartfelt emphasis: - Thank you, thank you for the pleasure you have given me!

Yours, Richard Wagner.

To Stein's rejoinder, Wagner replied on 3 July:

Dear friend!

Please take this opportunity to thank me in brief for your exceptionally friendly letter, and, if you please, also inform Herr Laue of my joy at having won such an affectionate heart in him, as well as in you [...]

Your most devoted Richard Wagner.

The programming and performance practice met with Franz Liszt's admiration and prompted him to come to Sondershausen three times to experience concerts under Stein. Even after Stein's death, further visits followed. With Liszt, the pianist, conductor and feared critic Hans von Bülow and the journalist and editor of the Neue Zeitschrift für Musik in Leipzig, Franz Brendel, also came to the residential city. With their praising reports, they made the town of Sondershausen and the orchestra widely known in the music world.

== Legacy ==
To commemorate the year on 16 March 1865, a marble stone with the inscription "EDUARD STEIN | † | XVI MAERZ MDCCCLXIV" was ceremoniously unveiled on the grave (in what was then the Rosengarten cemetery). This gravesite was levelled in 1952. Since 2012, there has been a stele with Stein's portrait and life data on the Alten Gottesacker.

Until the demolition of the Loh Hall in 1973, Stein's name stood alongside other bandmasters of the Loh Orchestra in a surrounding frieze in the concert shell. Today, a replica of this frieze can be found in the music department of the Sondershausen Palace. His name can also be read in the foyer of the concert hall Haus der Kunst in Sondershausen.
