= Loh-Orchester Sondershausen =

German symphony orchestra

The Loh-Orchester Sondershausen is an orchestra from Sondershausen founded around 1600. It influenced Music in Germany in the 19th century by helping the music of Richard Wagner and Franz Liszt to achieve a breakthrough.

Since 1991, the Loh-Orchester Sondershausen has been part of the Theater Nordhausen/Loh-Orchester Sondershausen GmbH. Manager since August 2016 is Daniel Klajner. conductor and general music director since 2016 is Michael Helmrath.

== Origin of the name ==
From 1806, the outdoor concerts were also open to the general public. They took place in Lohpark, to the northwest, below Sondershausen Palace. A certain temporal rhythm established itself, so that they were soon called "Lohpark Concerts". The park used to be an oak forest. The bark of the trees was used to make tanbark for tanning animal skins.

In 1918, the abdication of the Prince and the "Princely Chapel" was renamed the "Loh Orchestra".

== History ==
=== From the 17th to the end of the 19th century ===
In the Thuringian residences of Sondershausen and Rudolstadt, a development in music began which is described as the emergence of "music courts". After 1600, the Sondershausen court had employed instrumentalists who were equal in salary to higher ecclesiastical dignitaries. In return, they had to be ready to play at any time wherever the court was. They did not yet form a court chapel, as they were closely interwoven with the duties of church music. The vocal ensemble in the church drew its singers from the municipal school choir. Particularly able young men were given lessons in playing string and wind instruments at the court's expense. After training, they could be accepted into the court orchestra. The leader was given the title "Fürstlicher Capellmeister".

In 1617, Michael Praetorius came to the court of Sondershausen and reorganised the music band. In 1619, he dedicated his Polyhymnia exercitatrix to it. Therefore 1619 is regarded as the founding date of the Lohorchesters. In 1644/1645, the first court trumpeters were employed. Their first deployment was at the consecration of the town church (St Trinitatis) in 1699 (the ensemble consisted of eight trumpeters and one army timpanist). They also had to perform as the prince's escort of honour and for "procession blowing". They were not yet included in the court chapel.

Known court conductors from the early days of the orchestra are: Johann Friedrich Holtzer (1659), Jeremias Koch (1662), Elias Christoph Stock (1686). A sing-ballet composed by Stock was a small opera with dance (ballet) under the title In honour of the great Pan. The text was written by the Swedish scholar Carl Gustav Heraeus, who was employed at court. In 22 scene sections, Christian William I, Prince of Schwarzburg-Sondershausen was celebrated as Pan on his 55th birthday. He himself took on a role as a dancer. The one-off performance was on 6 January 1702. The sheet music no longer exists.

The orchestra's heyday began under the direction of the Sondershäuser Johann Balthasar Christian Freißlich (1687-1764). He led the chapel until 1731, then went to Danzig as musical director of the opera. Freißlich composed cantatas, secular festive music and an operina The Nun in Love. The composer Gottfried Heinrich Stölzel (1690-1749) had applied for the post in Sondershausen after Stock's death. He did not get it, however, as Freißlich was preferred as a local. After Freißlich's departure, the prince tried to entice Stölzel away from the Gotha court. Since he did not succeed, however, he commissioned him to write compositions, most of which were premiered in Sondershausen. Stölzel's works were preserved in Sondershausen Castle, while they were destroyed in Gotha. Stölzel's works in Sondershausen include 339 church cantatas, Passion musics, secular cantatas and a Passion oratorio. Much of this was composed for the Gotha court. A musical stage play in the style of an opera entitled Irene and Apollo was written in 1733 for the music-savvy patron of the arts Prince Günther I.

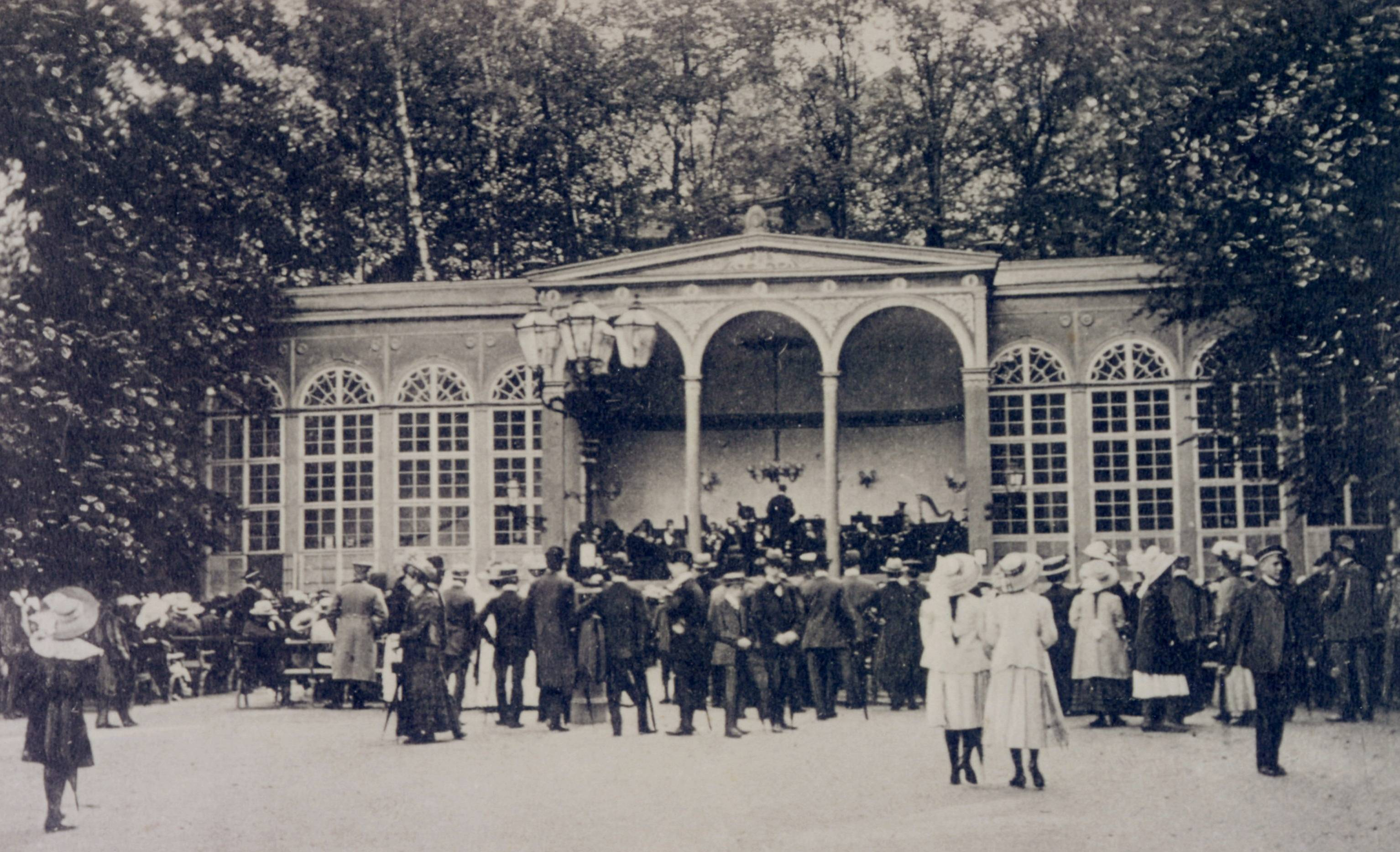
The Loh halle of Scheppig

After the death of Günther I, the "Kapellführer" changed frequently without any loss of quality in the musical life of the Sondershausen court. In addition to the commitment of the princes, citizens of the town, such as Ernst Ludwig Gerber and Hofrat Suckow, increasingly became involved in music, also due to the effects of the French Revolution. It led to Prince Friedrich Carl I allowing the general public to attend public concerts from 1806.

The clarinettist Johann Simon Hermstedt (1778-1846) had formed the hautboist corps of 12 musicians from the princely guard music corps in 1801. They played music in military uniform in the Lohpark in the so-called "half moon", a spot south of the later Lohhalle. By redesigning the entire square, the "Loh-Halle" was built in 1837. It served as a concert venue until 1967 and was demolished in 1971. Today, it would no longer be usable for concerts because of the long-distance road B4 behind it. The musicians of the Hermstedt Hautboistenkorps were masters not only of wind instruments but also of strings. Their participation in the court orchestra raised its musical level. At the beginning of the 19th century, the court orchestra was staffed not only with professional musicians, but also with capable amateurs from the middle classes and the civil service. It was not until the 1840s that the court orchestra consisted exclusively of professional musicians.

The demands of musical theatre played an essential role in the development of the "Princely Chapel". Opera performances were also held here and there in the 18th century. At the beginning of the 19th century, the repertoire included operas by Mozart, Luigi Cherubini, Dittersdorf and Carl Maria von Weber. After opera performances had always taken place in temporary rooms, Prince Carl Günther I had a court theatre built next to the palace in 1825. From 1825 to 1830 there were 295 opera performances.

Court conductor Eduard Stein from Kleinschirma near Freiberg in Saxony has merits in concert music, but especially in opera music. He popularised the compositions of Richard Wagner and Franz Liszt. Important singers from major German cities gave guest performances. The orchestra with its concert performances and the theatre as an opera stage became a household name throughout Germany. The directors of the Hofkapelle after Stein were: Friedrich Marpurg (1864), Adolf Blaßmann (1865), Max Bruch (1867-1870), especially in theatre service Max Erdmannsdörfer (1871-1880). Wagner's Flying Dutchman became an outstanding success in 1871. The singer of Erik later became Heldentenor at the Vienna Court Opera. In 1891, 23 opera productions were staged, including Tannhäuser, Fidelio and Lohengrin.

Another important orchestra conductor besides Max Bruch was Karl Schröder II, who served as Hofkapellmeister from 1881 to 1885 and 1890 to 1907. In the meantime, he was First Kapellmeister of the Royal Orchestra in Berlin and subsequently director of the Hamburg Opera. In 1883 he founded the Conservatory of Music in Sondershausen. He chaired the Tonkünstlerversammlung in Sondershausen in 1886. Its honorary president was Franz Liszt. Liszt stayed in Sondershausen for several days every year.

=== 20th century to the present ===
After the Second World War the orchestra was in an existential crisis. The commitment of the population and support from the authorities made it possible for it to continue to exist. Today the orchestra is called Loh-Orchester Sondershausen. The orchestra no longer bears the name "Max Bruch Philharmonic". It has 56 professional musicians (May 2007). It has been part of the Theater Nordhausen/Loh-Orchester Sondershausen since 1991. The sponsors are the cities of Nordhausen and Sondershausen as well as the Districts of Nordhausen and Kyffhäuserkreis. With its general music director Hiroaki Masuda, the orchestra toured Japan in October 2004.

The Loh Orchestra has three regular concert series: 6 symphony concerts, 3 castle concerts and 5 Loh concerts per season. In addition, New Year's concerts, concerts at the turn of the year, opera gala and carnival concerts have become a tradition. In the Theater Nordhausen it plays as a theatre orchestra.

From 2004 to 2016, it was Lars Tietje intendant and managing director.

== Kapellmeister of the Hofkapelle and conductor of the Loh Orchestra ==
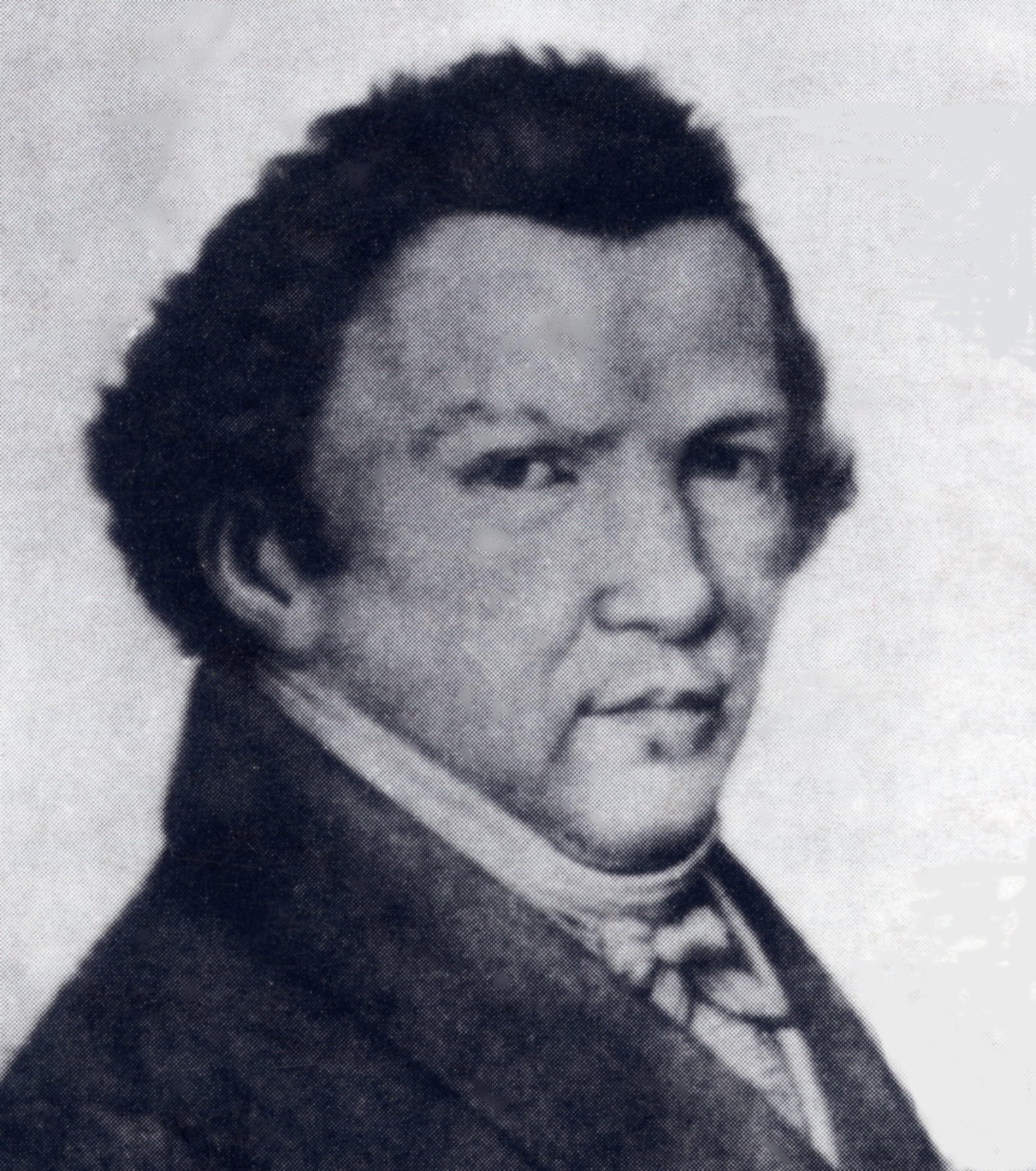
Johann Simon Hermstedt

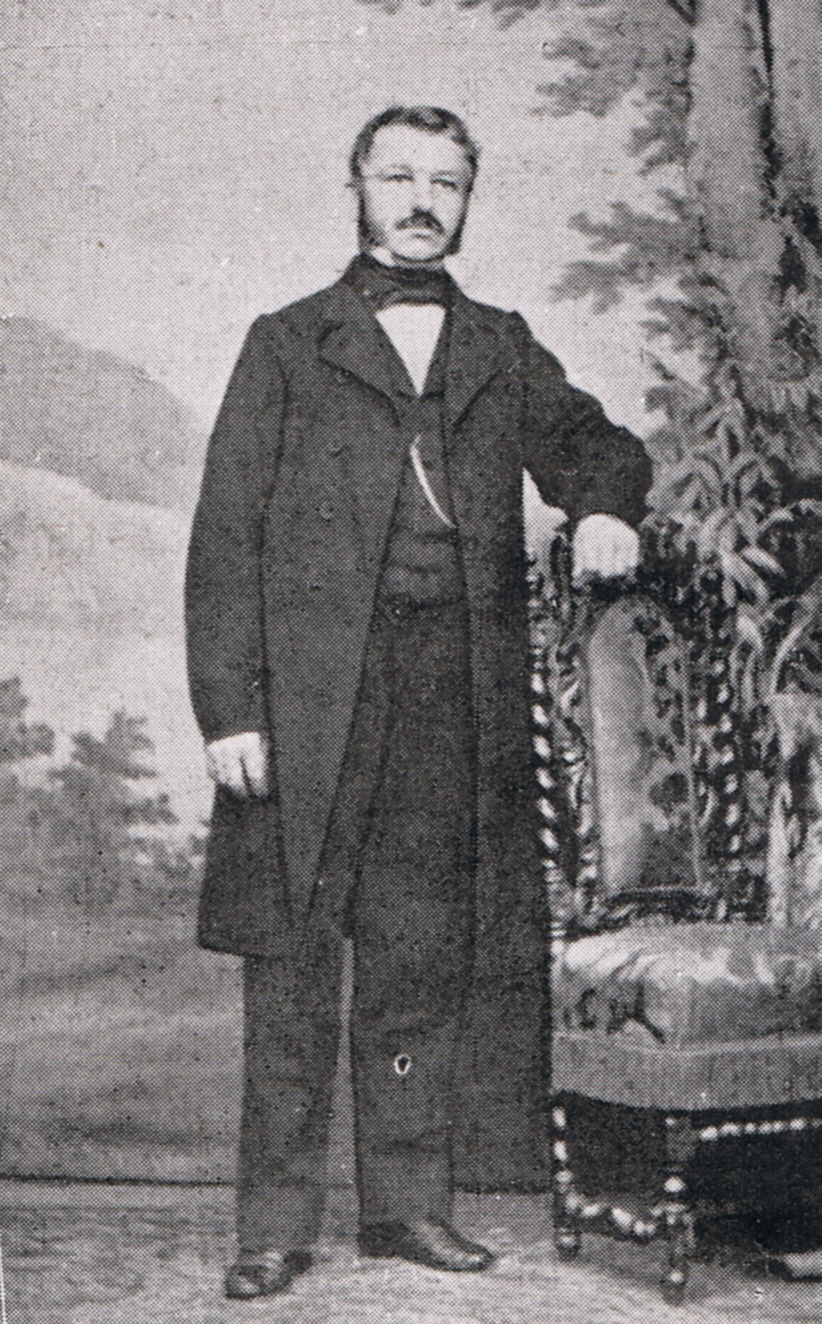
Gottfried Herrmann

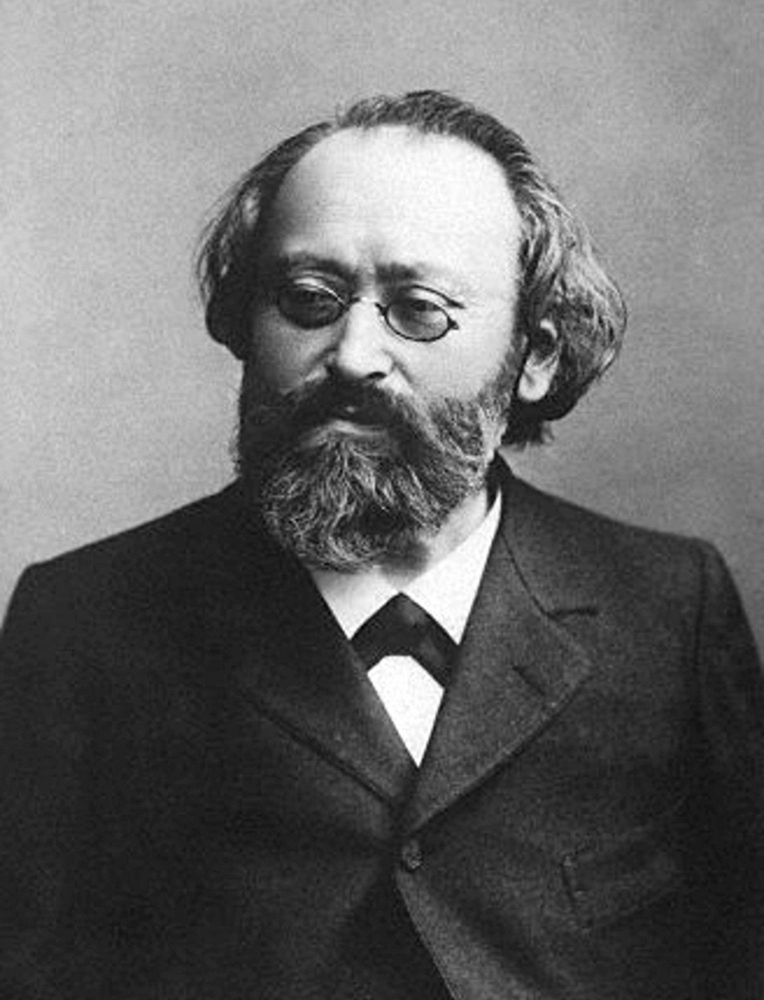
Max Bruch

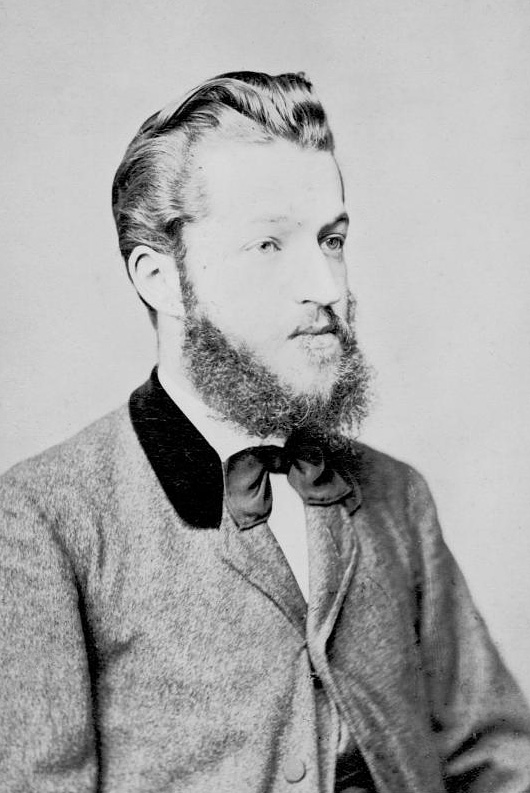
Max Erdmannsdörfer

- 1659–1682: Johann Friedrich Holtzner
- 1682–1692: Jeremias Koch
- 1692–1718: Elias Christoph Stock
- 1718–1731: Johann Balthasar Freislich
- 1731–1758: Heinrich Johann Bona
- 1758–1766: Leopold August Abel
- 1766: August Friedrich Rothe
- 1780: Haußmann Krause
- 1802–1839: Johann Simon Hermstedt
- 1839–1843: Wilhelm Kirchhoff
- 1843–1844: Louis Huth
- 1844: Louis Bohnhardt
- 1844–1852: Gottfried Herrmann
- 1852–1864: Eduard Stein
- 1864–1866: Friedrich Marpurg
- 1867: Adolf Blaßmann
- 1867–1870: Max Bruch
- 1871–1880: Max Erdmannsdörfer
- 1880: Heinrich Frankenberger
- 1881: August König
- 1881–1886: Carl Schroeder
- 1886–1890: Adolf Schultze
- 1890–1907: Carl Schroeder
- 1907–1910: Traugott Ochs
- 1910–1911: Rudolf Herfurth
- 1911–1934: Carl Corbach
- 1934–1939: Otto Wartisch
- 1940–1945: Carl Maria Artz
- 1945–1948: Georg Karl Winkler
- 1948–1949: Erich Glückmann
- 1949–1950: Wilhelm Buschkötter
- 1950–1951: Walter Schartner
- 1951–1957: Paul Dörrie
- 1957–1958: Armin Pickerodt
- 1958–1959: Paul Diener
- 1959–1970: Gerhart Wiesenhütter
- 1970–1978: Horst Förster
- 1978–1995: Karl Heinz Richter
- 1995–1999: Anton Kolar
- 1999–2002: Peter Stangel
- 2002–2008: Hiroaki Masuda
- 2008–2016: Markus L. Frank
- Since 2016: Michael Helmrath

== Statements by celebrities ==
Johann Wolfgang von Goethe wrote to his son August after hearing the Hautboistencorps in Bad Tennstedt in 1816: "The music director Hermstedt from Sondershausen blows the clarinet excellently. He had brought the entire harmony, i.e. over a dozen blowing artists; they did their job well."

In 1856, Hans von Bülow wrote for the Neue Zeitschrift für Musik: "It seemed as if with the greatness of the task, the forces to defeat it had also grown. The execution (Liszt-Mazeppa) was admirable in its lively conception and technical endurance. The Sondershausen band may claim the fame of the initiative without the worry that it will soon be surpassed in this beautiful achievement by another."

Franz Liszt in a letter to Baron Lothar von Thüna: "The orchestra which he (Max Erdmannsdörfer) conducts ranks among the most renowned in Germany, and rightly so, for the orchestral works have nowhere been performed with so much cleverness, accuracy and power."

Max Bruch to Clara Schumann (7 August 1867): "... I have a fixed salary of 1000 Thaler and even enjoy the priceless title of "Court Kapellmeister", have a great deal of time to work, conduct a quite excellent court orchestra, am together with the orchestra almost daily, perform all the good music that exists, am completely independent in determining the programmes, and am sure of the full approval of our music-loving princess in all undertakings".

Richard Wagner in a letter dated 3 May 1858 from Zurich to Kapellmeister Eduard Stein concerning the performance of Lohengrin at the Court Theatre in Sondershausen on 26. March 1858: "... I have just read a report on your performance of my Lohengrin, and I see from it that I was so happy to meet in you one of those rare friends whose beautiful and uplifting participation alone does not make me regret having given my works to the public, where they so often and usually experience the fate of maltreatment and ridicule. [...] To your honoured orchestra, as well as to the singers unknown to me, who distinguished themselves so well in Lohengrin, my greatest thanks and best regards! [...] Thanks, thanks for the pleasure you gave me!"

From a letter by Max Bruch to Johannes Brahms of 15 June 1870: "... The Princely Orchestra is very good, one of the most beautiful orchestras in Germany. There is excellent discipline; the people are willing and enthusiastic. The most difficult things can be performed very well with this splendidly well-rehearsed orchestra without much effort. In no other place in Germany are so many orchestral novelties performed during the concert season as here......The intercourse with the orchestra is easy and pleasant. I am on the best of terms with the people and will always remain on the friendliest terms with them even after my departure."
