= Otto Wartisch =

German conductor and composer (1893–1969)

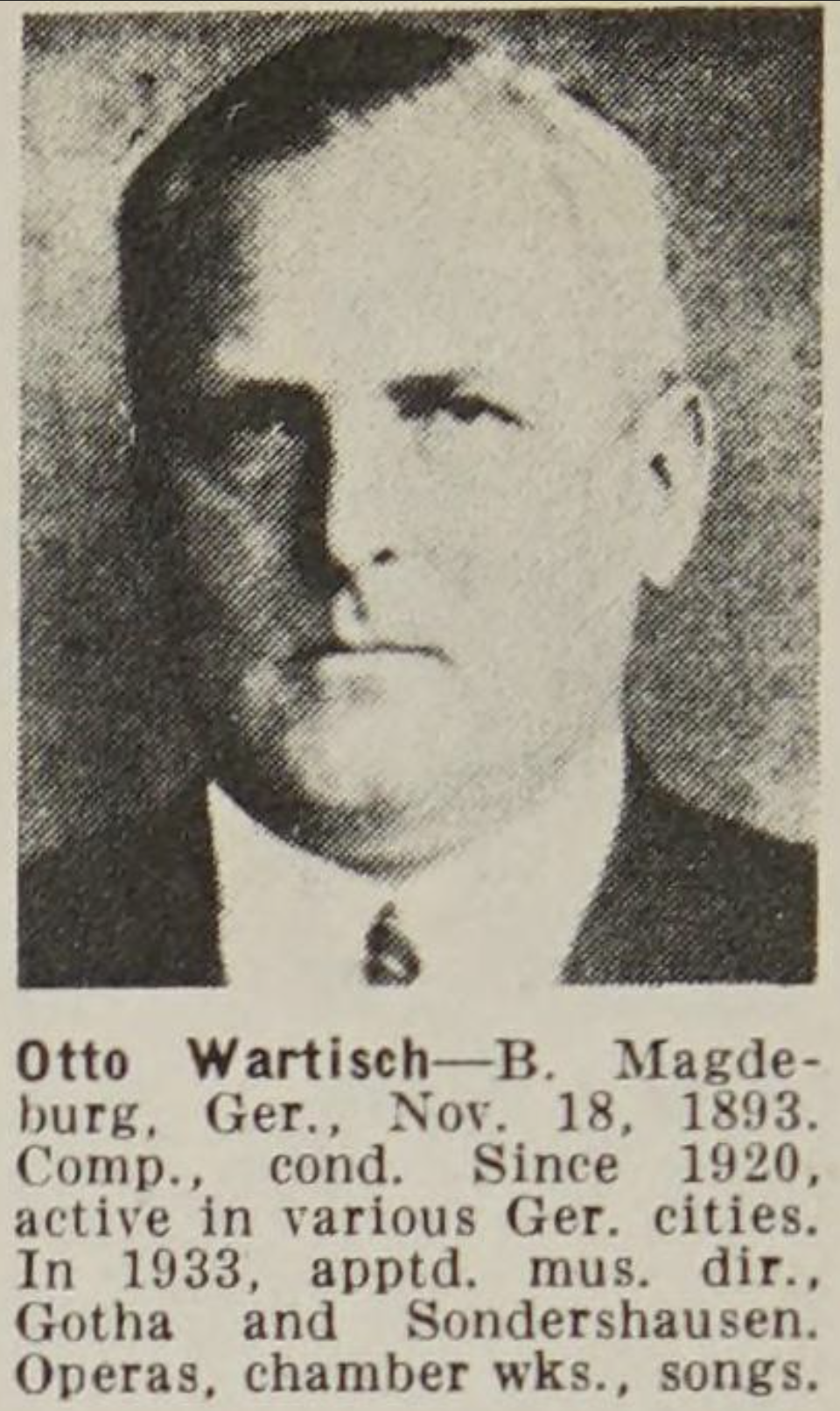
Portrait of Otto Wartisch in Guy McCoy, Portraits of the World's Best-Known Musicians, 1946

Otto Alexander Hermann Wartisch (18 November 1893 – 29 April 1969) was a German composer, conductor, and cultural figure in Nazi Germany.

== Life ==
Born in Magdeburg, Wartisch received his doctorate from Erlangen with a dissertation titled Studien zur Harmonik des musikalischen Impressionismus in 1928, which was published in 1930. Also in 1930, he became a member of the Nationalsozialistische Deutsche Arbeiterpartei (membership number 400.618). After the Nazi seizure of power, he succeeded Carl Corbach as SA-Standartenführer from 1934 to 1939, and acted as Kapellmeister of the Hofkapelle and the conductors of the Loh-Orchester Sondershausen. During the Second World War, he became the SA-Oberführer Intendant of the Katowice opera house. Wartisch organised, in cooperation with the Auschwitz concentration camp, "troop support events" for the concentration camp personnel there, such as performances of the farces Gitta hat einen Vogel on 5 April 1943 and Gestörte Hochzeitsnacht on 2 October 1943. Musical evenings were held on the themes of Upbeat Music and Musical Delicacies of Opera and Operetta. Wartisch dedicated the composition Deutsche Rhapsodie to Julius Streicher, the publisher of the anti-Semitic diatribe Der Stürmer. He then became a concert conductor in Munich, and in 1951 his work Scharlott fährt gen Himmel was premiered in Bremen.

Wartisch died in Wolfratshausen at age 75.

== Work ==
- Kaukasische Komödie One-act opera, premiered 8 March 1933 in Nuremberg
- Jahrmarktsballade 'heitere Funkoper', first broadcast on 17 February 1950 by Radio Bremen.
