= Horst Förster (conductor, 1933) =

German conductor and musicologist

Horst Förster (born 13 September 1933) is a German conductor and musicologist who lives and works in Berlin.

== Life and career ==
Born in Leipzig, Förster began his studies to become a Kapellmeister at the University of Music and Theatre Leipzig. In 1954, he founded the Collegium musicum (now the Akademisches Orchester Leipzig) at Leipzig University, which regularly gives concerts at the Gewandhaus. Förster graduated as Diplom-Kapellmeister in 1957. This was followed by studies in musicology at the Leipzig Academy of Music, which he completed with a diploma in 1963. He was awarded a doctorate with the dissertation Die Form in den symphonischen Werken von Alexander Scriabin.

With the Leipzig Academic Orchestra, which he conducted for 60 years, Förster gave concerts in numerous countries in Europe and in the US, Canada, China and Japan.

From 1970 to 1978, he served as music director of the State Loh-Orchester Sondershausen. He was then chief conductor of the Schweriner Philharmonie from 1978 to 1988. In Schwerin, he played a leading role in establishing the local branch of the Hochschule für Musik Hanns Eisler Berlin from 1981. There, he was a lecturer in music history. In 1987, he became an honorary professor. In 1988, he received a professorship for conducting.

Since 1991, Förster has lived in Berlin as a freelance conductor and musicologist. He has repeatedly been guest conductor at the Great Romantics Festival of the American Liszt Society in Hamilton/Canada and at the Immanuel and Helen Olshan Texas Music Festival in Houston/US.

== Awards ==
- 2006: Appointment as Honorary Life Member of the American Liszt Society.
- 2013: Ehrenmedaille der Stadt Leipzig.

== Publications ==
- Die Form in den symphonischen Werken von Alexander N. Skrjabin. Dissertation, Leipzig, 1964.
