= Leah Traugott =

American artist

- Born: January 16, 1924; Cincinnati, Ohio
- Died: January 15, 2018 (aged 93); Zionsville, Indiana
- Resting place: Indianapolis Hebrew Congregation Cemetery South
- Education: Herron School of Art and Design
- Occupation: Artist
- Spouse: Harry Joseph Traugott
- Children: Joseph Henri and Dale Ellen
- Parents: Joseph Henri Schneider (father); Rose Minkovsky (mother)

Leah Schneider Traugott (16 January 1924, Cincinnati, Ohio – 15 January 2018, Zionsville, Indiana), also known as Leah S. Traugott, was an American award-winning watercolorist and educator. She exhibited in more than eighty one-person shows and numerous group exhibitions.

== Life ==
Leah S. Traugott was born in Cincinnati in a family of Joseph Henri Schneider and Rose Minkovsky. At the age of 6 she moved to Indianapolis. She graduated from Shortridge High School in 1942 and Herron School of Art in 1946. During art school and later, she worked as a freelance fashion artist for H.P. Wasson and Company. Later she completed more study at Herron under Donald Mattison, Loran Dunlop, Garo Antresian, Edmund Brucker and John Taylor.

Traugott worked as a commercial illustrator for large Indianapolis department stores and became known for her depictions of women’s shoes. Later she taught drawing and painting classes at the Indianapolis Art Center for three decades. She has also taught at the Jewish Community Center and at the Herron Museum.

Traugott served on many boards including President of the Indiana Artist Club, the Executive Committee of the Washington Township Schools Planning Committee, and Secretary of the Women’s Committee of the Indiana State Symphony Society. Traugott was a member of the Pastel Society of America and Indiana Watercolor Society. She completed many adventure trips, including camping trek through the American Southwest in 1963; a drive throughout Mexico in 1964 and 1966; conventional trips to France, Italy, Israel, Peru, Guatemala and the Yucatan.

She married Harry Joseph Traugott on June, 27th 1946 and had two children, Joseph Henri and Dale Ellen. Leah S. Traugott died on January, 15th 2018 aged 93 and is buried at Indianapolis Hebrew Congregation Cemetery South.

== Art and recognition ==
Traugott created her colorful floral paintings working mostly in oils and sometimes in pastels. The two most important factors in her work were color and design. Her favorite subject was portraits, as well as floral still lives. Traugott’s artworks captured the color and vibrancy of Indiana landscapes and gardens, emphasizing fine details and a fine-tuned sense of color harmonies.

Her work was selected for national juried exhibitions, including "Century of American Watercolors" at the Indianapolis Museum of Art; "MidYear Show" at the Butler Institute of American Art, Youngstown, Ohio; "Watercolor USA" at the Springfield Museum of Art, Springfield, Missouri; "Rocky Mountain National Watermedia Exhibition", Golden, Colorado; "National Exhibition of the Pastel Society of America", in New York; Miniature Painters, Sculptors, and Gravers Society of Washington, DC; and "Nature Interpreted" at the Cincinnati Museum of Natural History.

She has won prizes in the Hoosier Salon; Indiana State Fairs; Whitewater Valley Exhibition; Herron Drawing prize and the Religious Art Exhibition. She also won the $500 second prize in the Indiana Artist Club exhibition at the Indianapolis Museum of Art and a merit prize at the Anderson Fine Arts Center in 1993. In addition, Traugott received awards from more than one hundred exhibitions, including the Indiana Artists Show at the Indianapolis Museum of Art; Kentucky Watercolor Society; Indiana Watercolor Society; and the Indiana Artists Club.

She received Distinguished Alumni Award from Herron School of Art and Design for exemplary career achievement and service to her alma mater in 2009.

Traugott’s achievements are mentioned in The Encyclopedia of Indianapolis.

== Exhibitions ==
- Indianapolis Art Center

== Collections ==
- Indianapolis Museum of Art
