= Annaberg Historic District =

- U.S. National Register of Historic Places
- U.S. Historic district
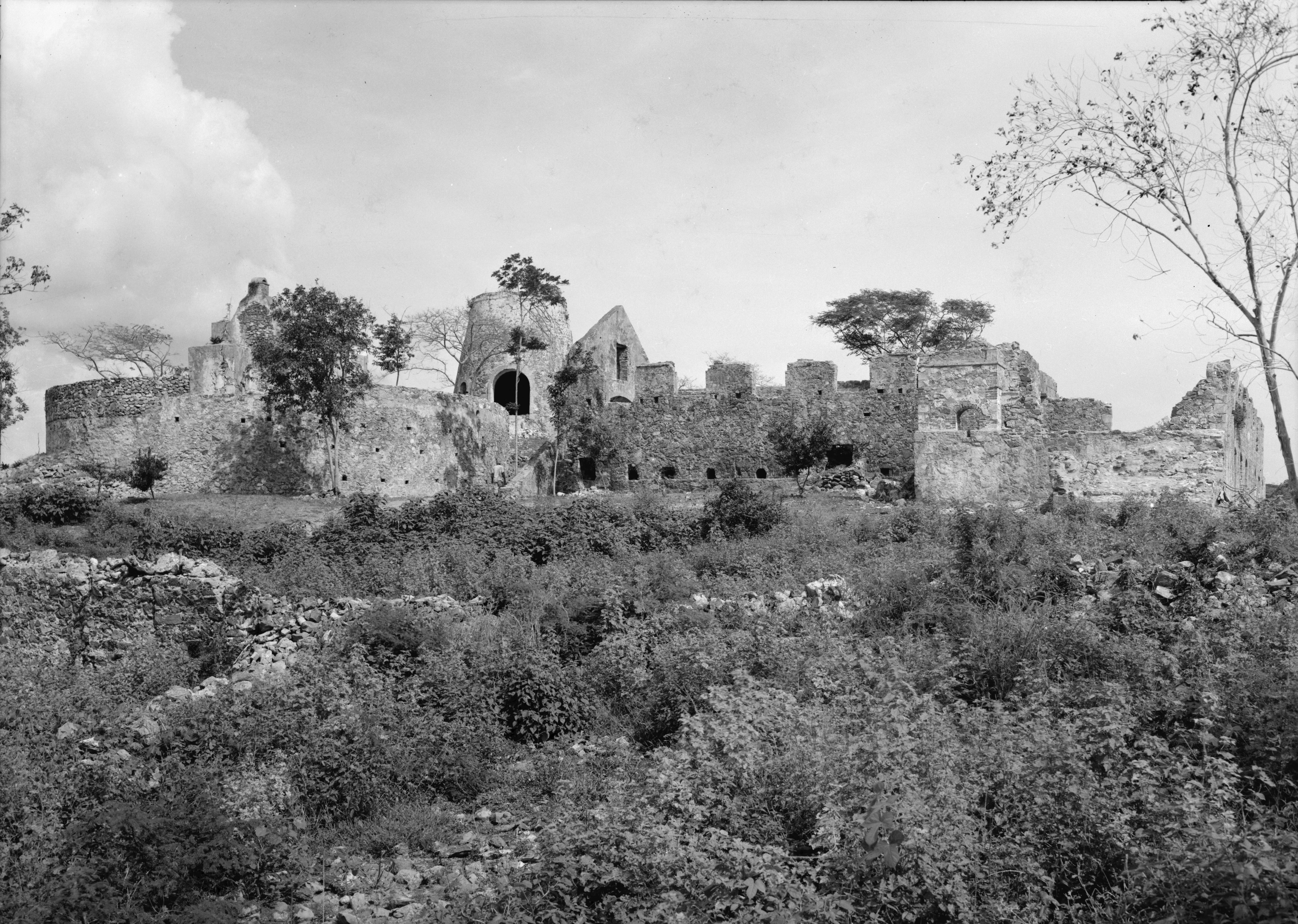
- Annaberg sugar plantation ruins

- Location within the U.S. Virgin Islands
- Location: Saint John, United States Virgin Islands
- Coordinates: 18°21′52″N 64°43′44″W
- Area: 15 acres (6.1 ha)
- MPS: Virgin Islands National Park MRA
- NRHP reference No.: 81000090
- Added to NRHP: July 23, 1981

Annaberg Historic District is a historic section of Saint John, United States Virgin Islands where the Annaberg sugar plantation ruins are located. The district is located on the north shore of the island west of Mary's Point in the Maho Bay quarter.

== Gallery ==
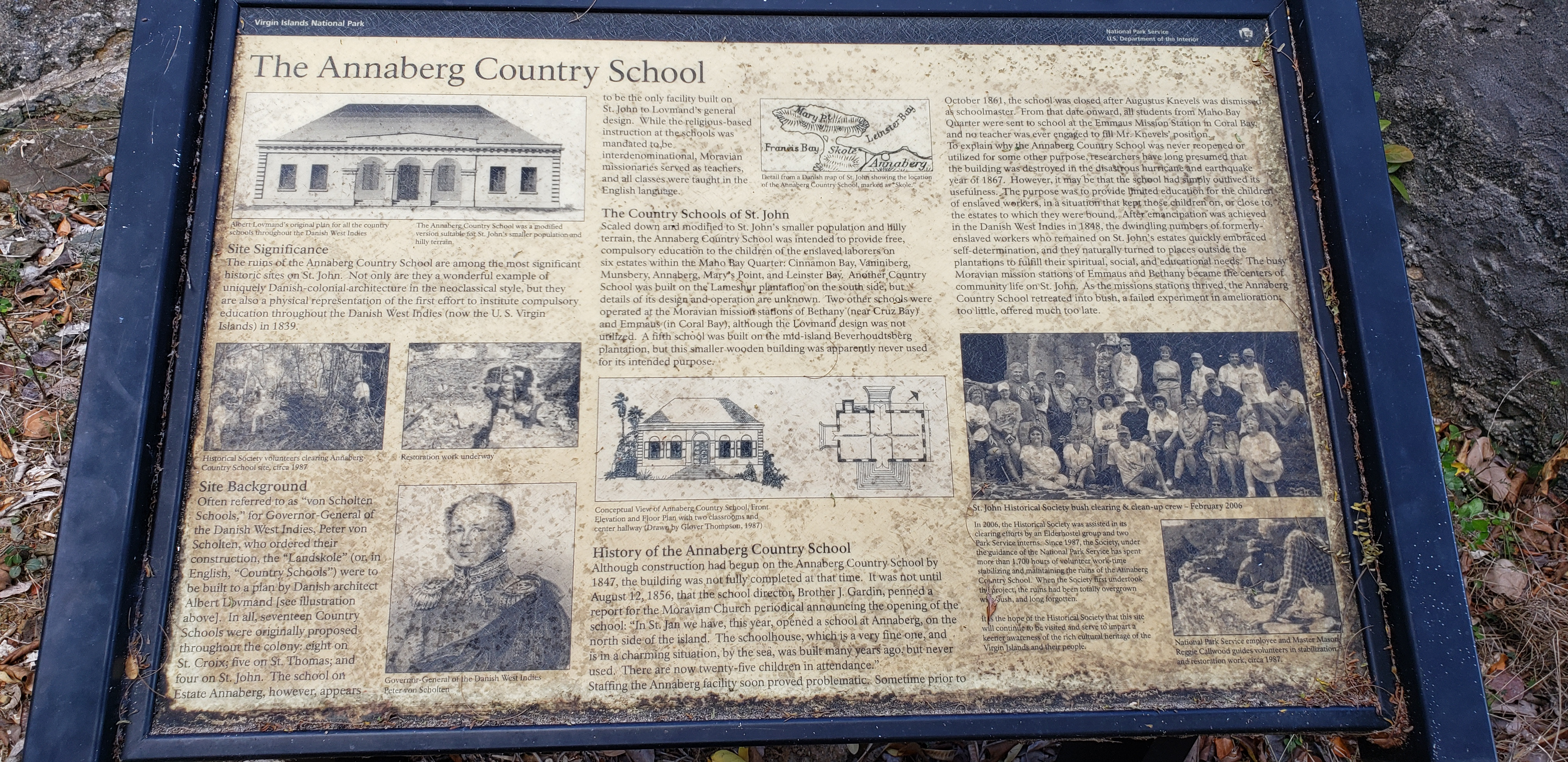
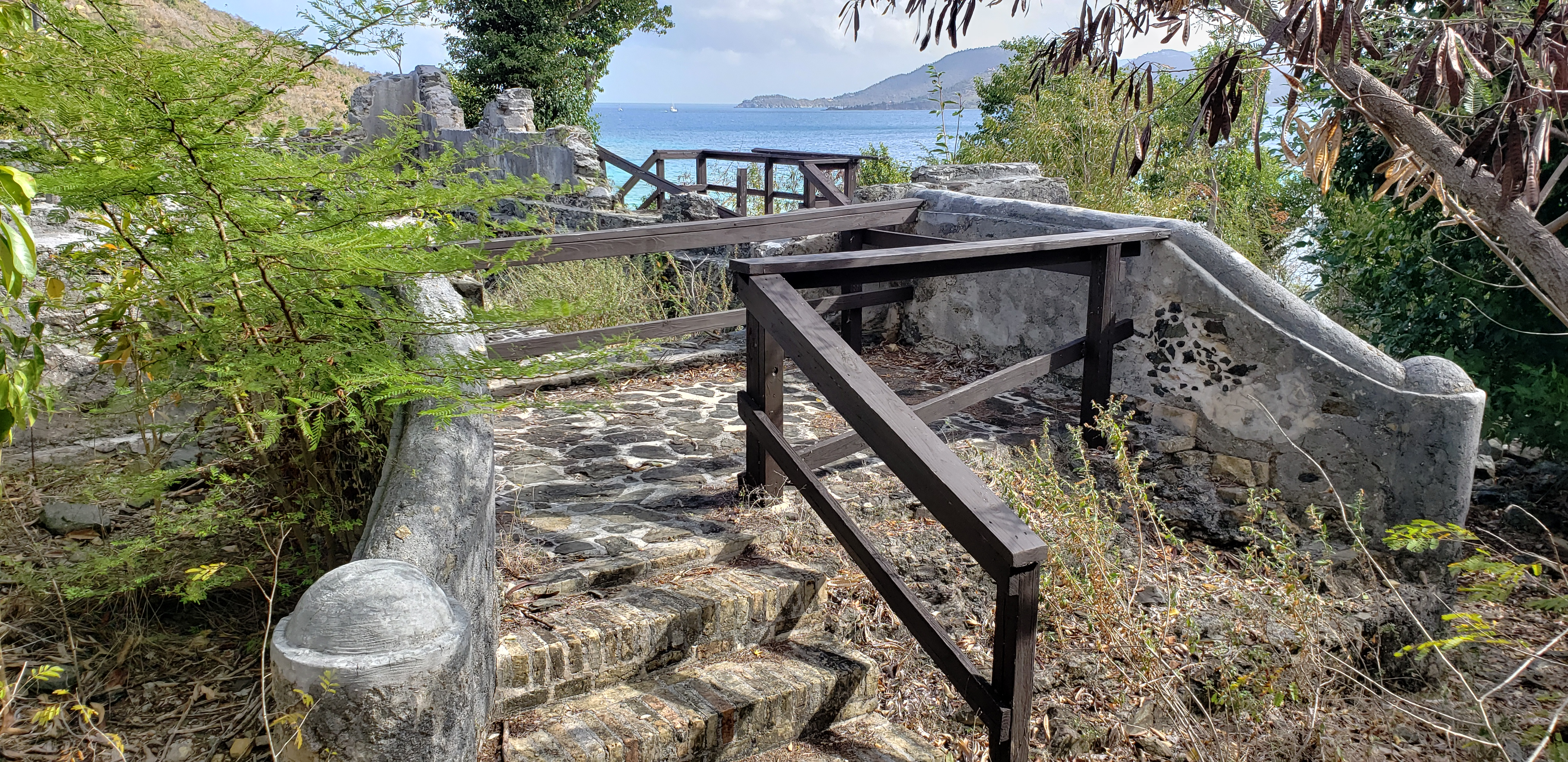
Annaberg School
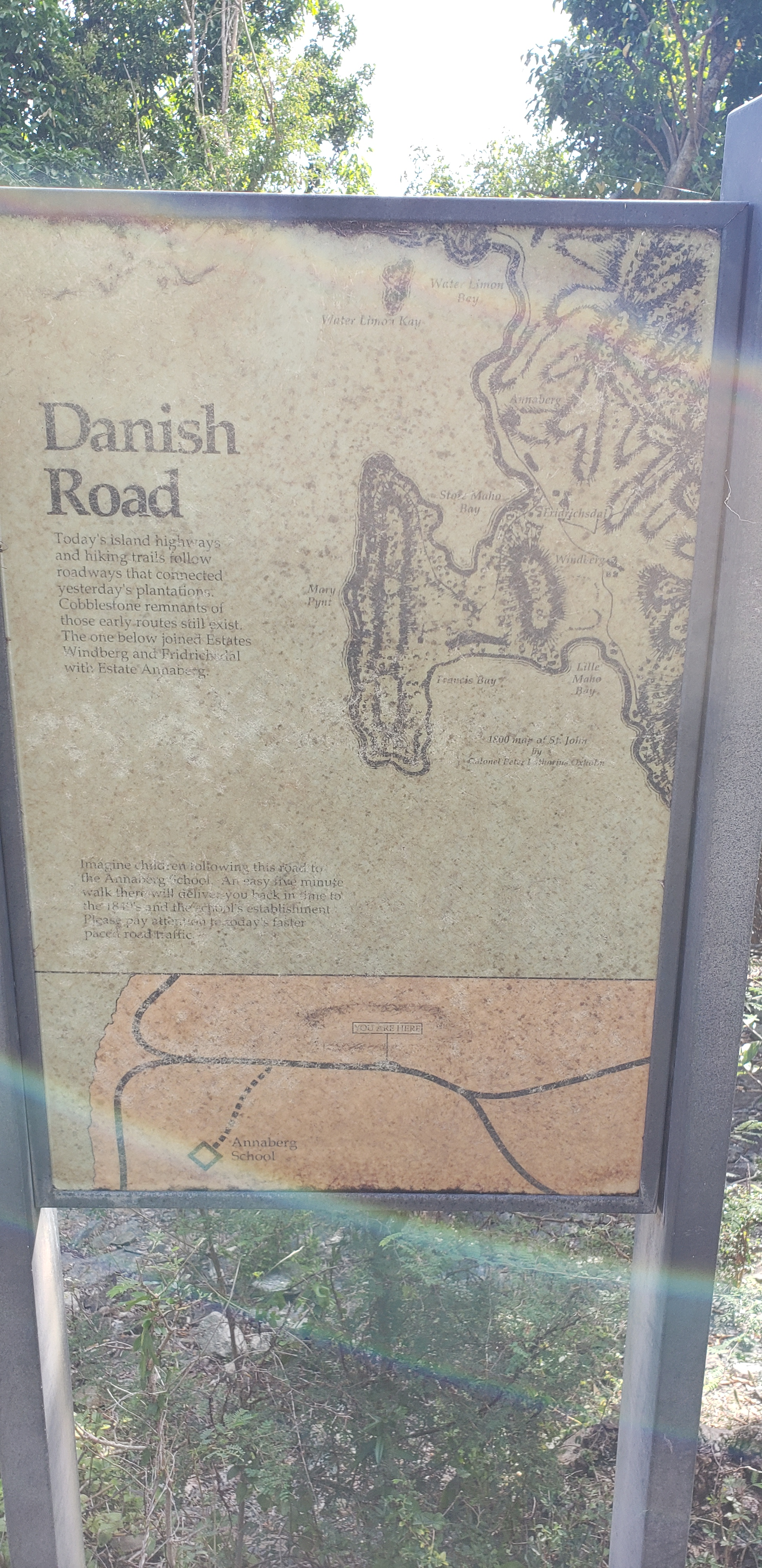
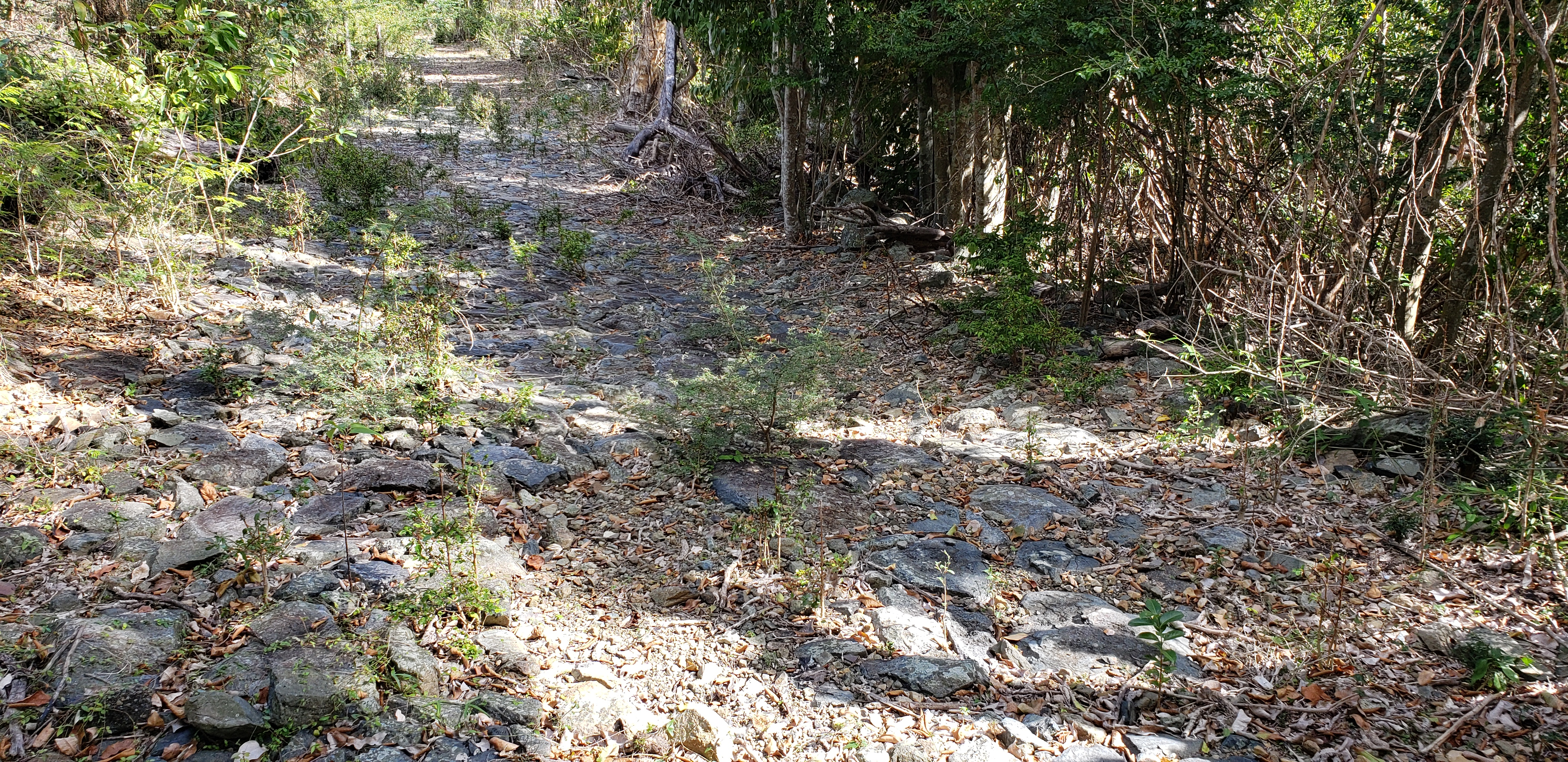
Danish Road
