= Johann Simon Hermstedt =

German clarinetist

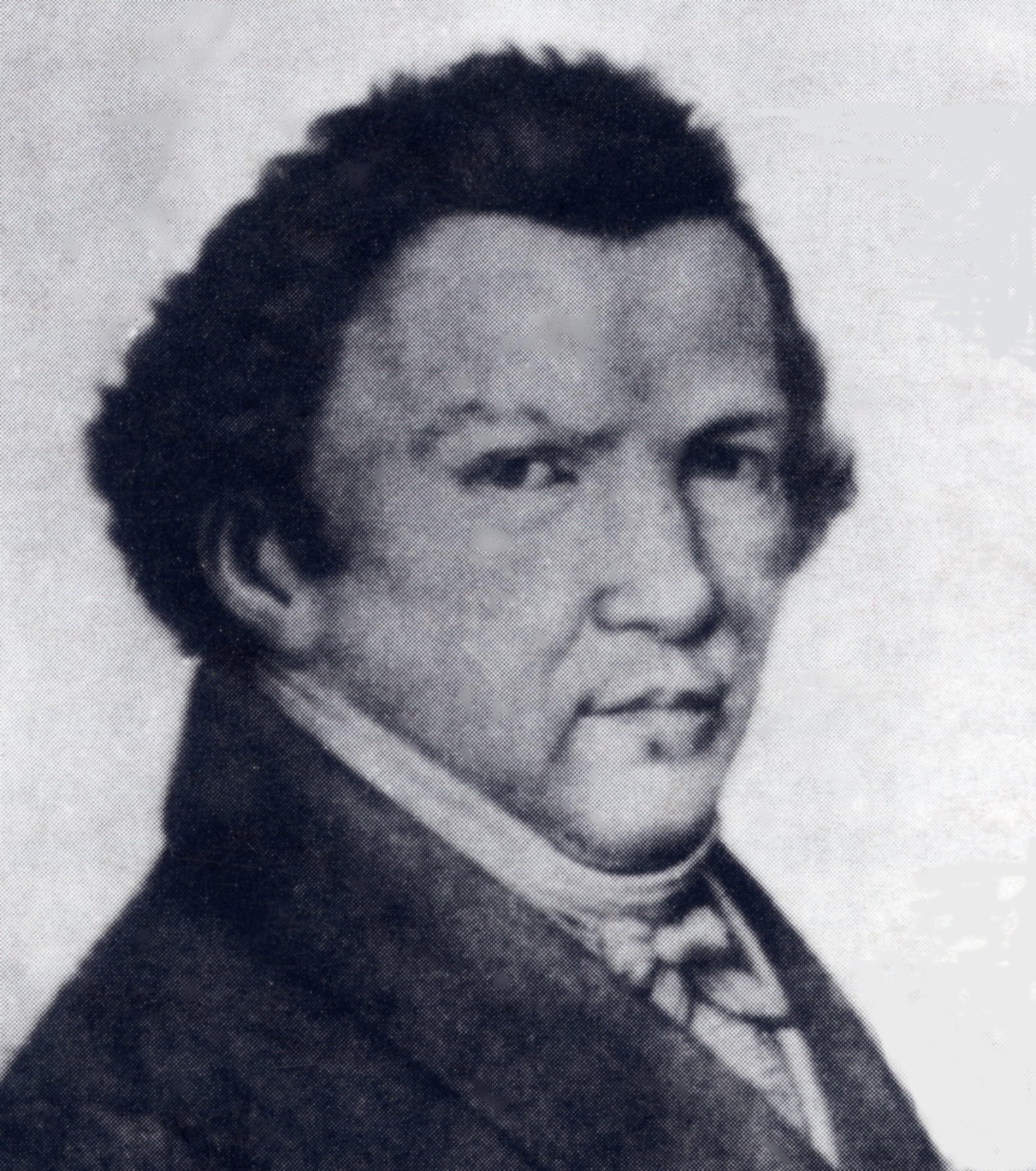
- Born: 29 December 1778; Germany
- Died: 10 August 1846 (aged 67)
- Occupation: clarinetist
- Known for: court clarinetist to Duke Günther I of Schwarzburg-Sondershausen

Johann Simon Hermstedt (29 December 1778 – 10 August 1846) was one of the most famous clarinetists of the 19th century. He is a German who served as court clarinettist to Duke Günther I of Schwarzburg-Sondershausen, and taught the Duke to play the clarinet. All four of Louis Spohr's clarinet concertos and several of his other clarinet works were written with Hermstedt's skills in mind and were dedicated to him. Hermstedt also composed a few works for wind instruments himself.
