= Traugott Ochs =

German organist and conductor

Traugott Ochs (19 October 1854 – 28 August 1919) was a German court Kapellmeister, organist and conductor.

== Life ==
Born in Altenfeld, Ochs made his conducting debut with the Berlin Philharmonic on 24 October 1905. He led the Bielefeld Philharmonic from 1901. From 1907 to 1910, he was Kapellmeister of the Hofkapelle and conductor of the Loh-Orchester Sondershausen.

Ochs died in Berlin aged 64.
