= Annaberg, Saint Croix, U.S. Virgin Islands =

Annaberg
- Village
- Location in Saint Croix, United States Virgin Islands Annaberg (the U.S. Virgin Islands)
- Coordinates: 17°42′42″N 64°46′28″W
- Country: United States Virgin Islands
- Island: Saint Croix
- Time zone: UTC-4 (AST)

Annaberg is a settlement on the island of Saint Croix in the United States Virgin Islands.

== History ==
Annaberg (Kings Quarter No. 27, 28, 32, Centre Police District, Christiansteds Jurisdiction) is a former sugar plantation. As of 1816, it covered 225 acres of land of which 111 acres were planted with sugar canes and 114 acres were under other cultivation. 95 enslaved labourers were present on the estate.

On 27 February 1827, it was sold by auction to Mrs. Sarah C Krause for iPs. 36,000. On 5 March 1836, March 5, she sold it to Burrows & Nottage for Ps. 20,000. On 6 May 1850, it was sold by auction to John Wakefield (mortgageholder) for $1000 (Anguilla included). The next owner was J. H. Lund.

== Sources ==
- U.S. Geological Survey Geographic Names Information System: Annaberg, Saint Croix, U.S. Virgin Islands
