= Annaberg, Saint John, U.S. Virgin Islands =

Coordinates: 18.36301°N 64.73014°W

Annaberg is a former sugar factory and plantation on the island of Saint John in the United States Virgin Islands. It is uninhabited and part of the Annaberg Historic District within the Virgin Islands National Park.

== History ==
The sugar plantation was established by the planter Christopher William Gottschalk in 1721. He named it after his daughter Anna. The former slave house dates from 1731. The other ruins are younger.

== Gallery ==
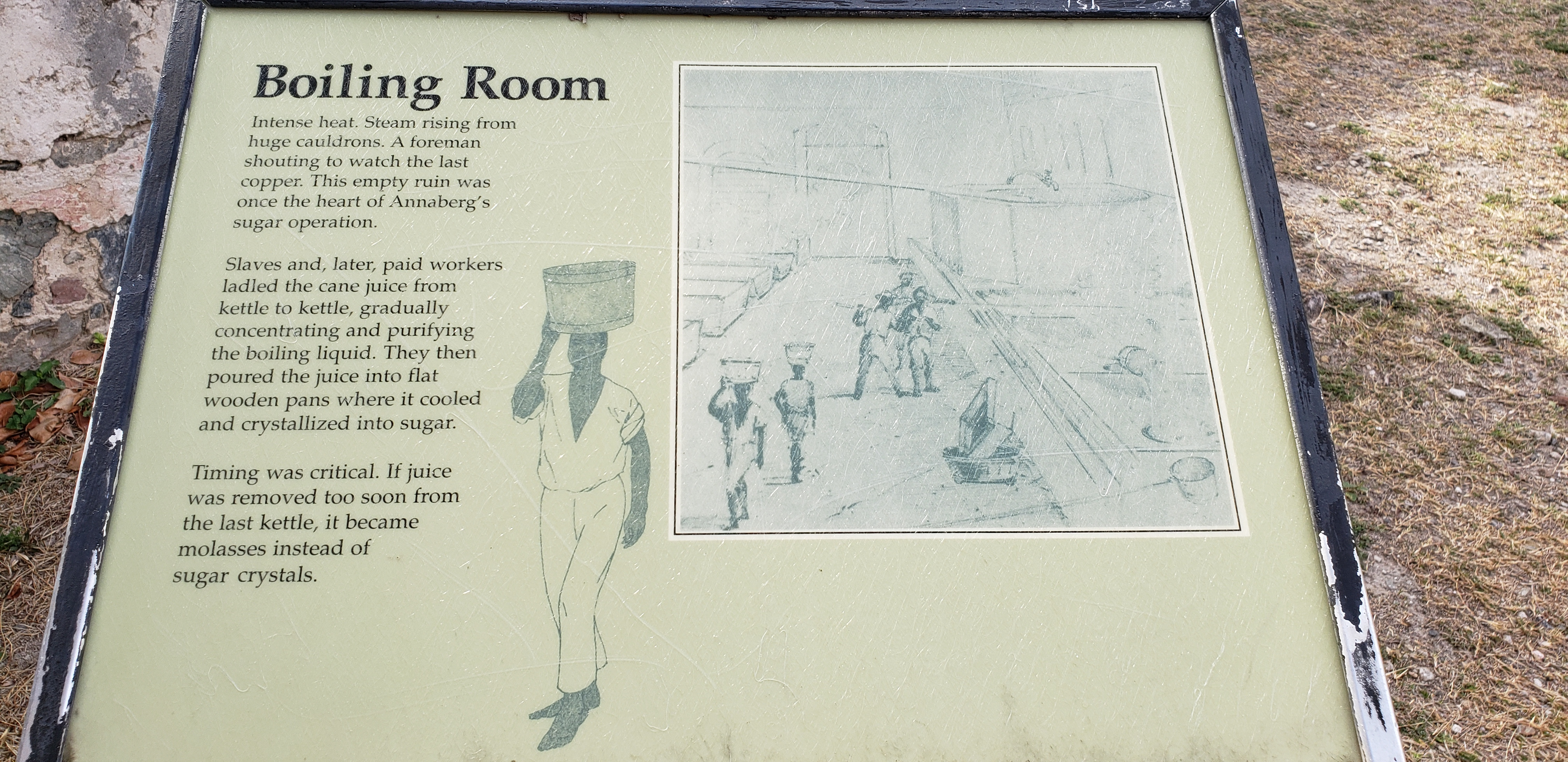
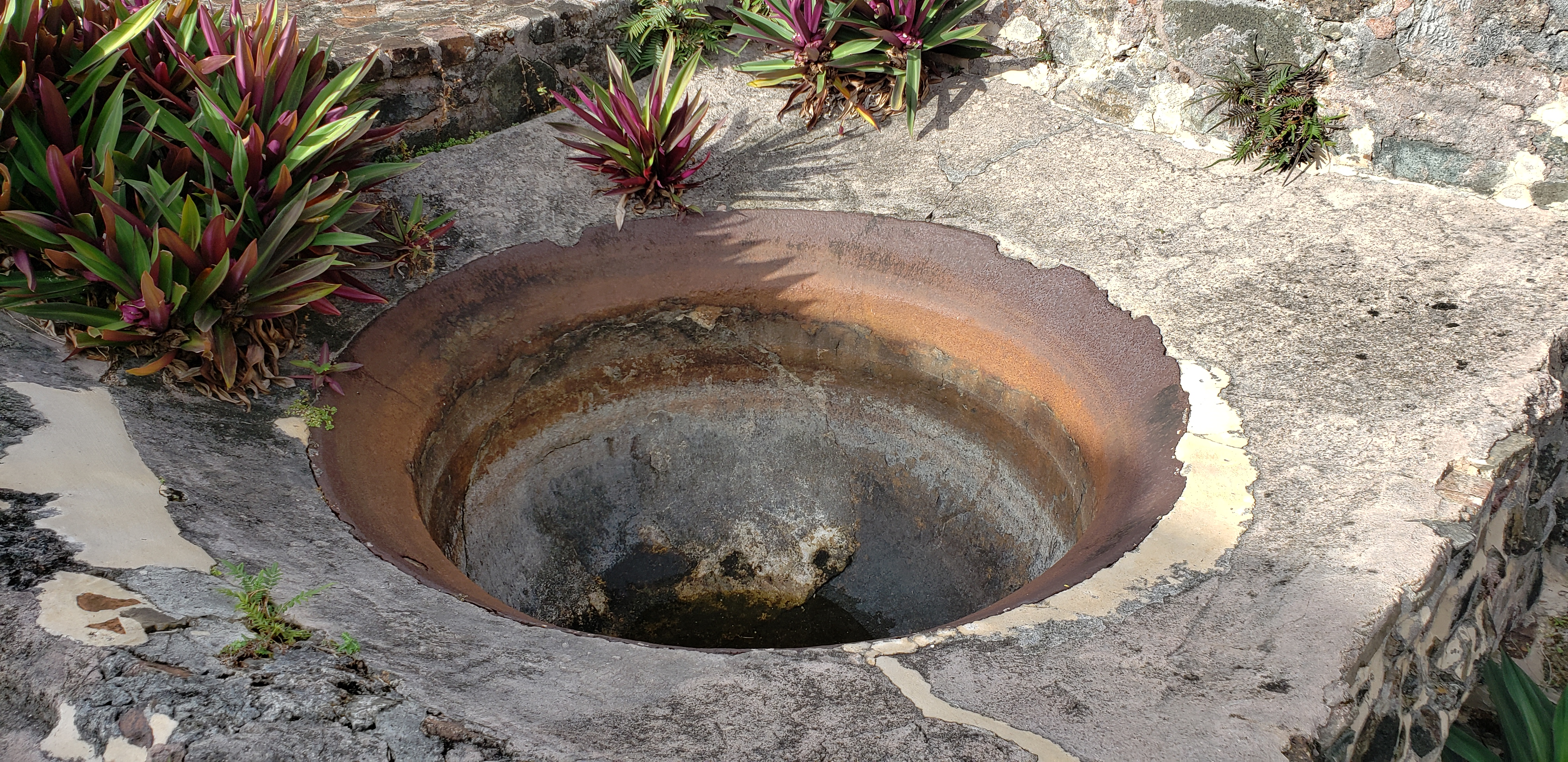
Annaberg Plantation Boiling Room
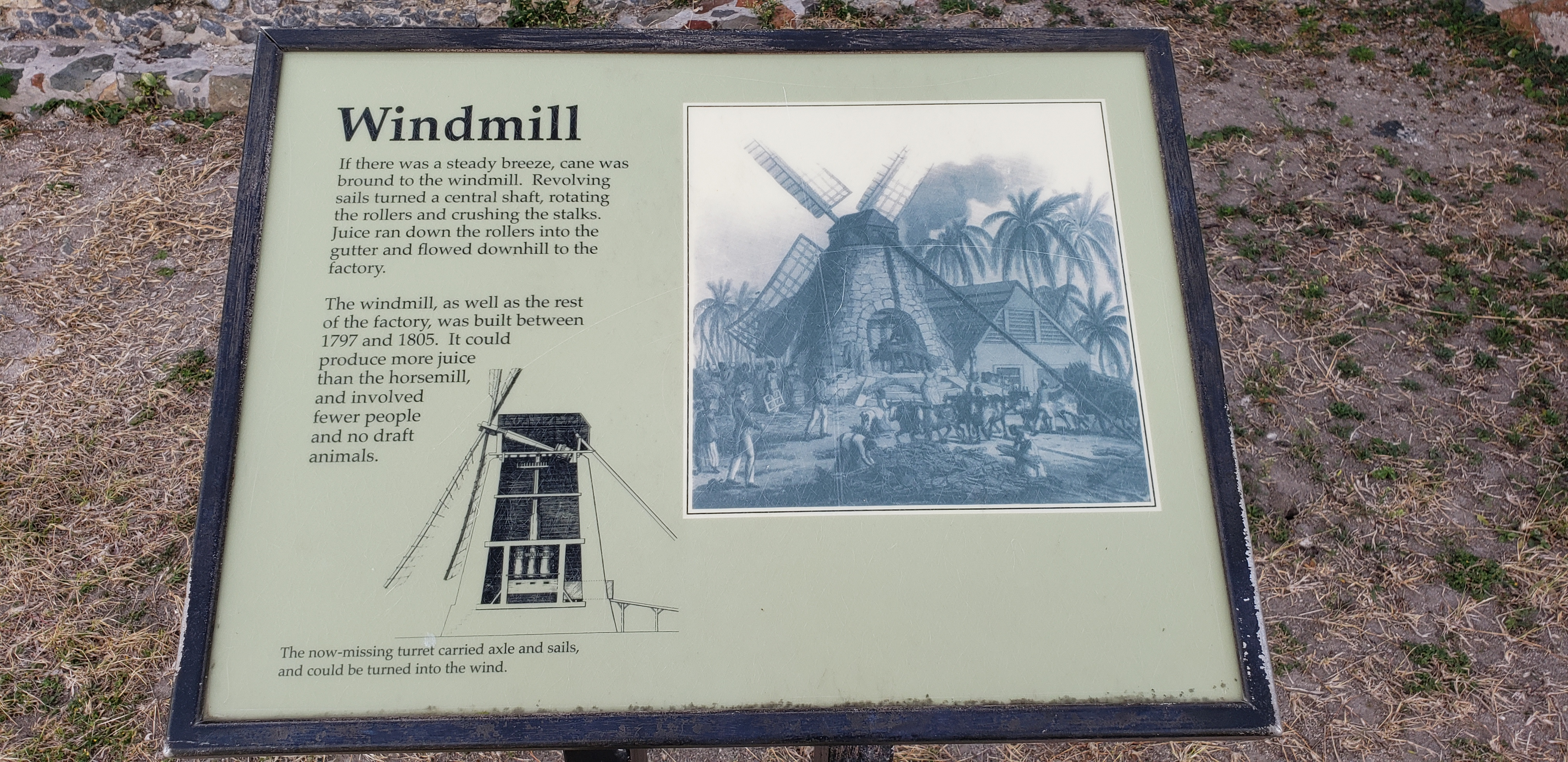
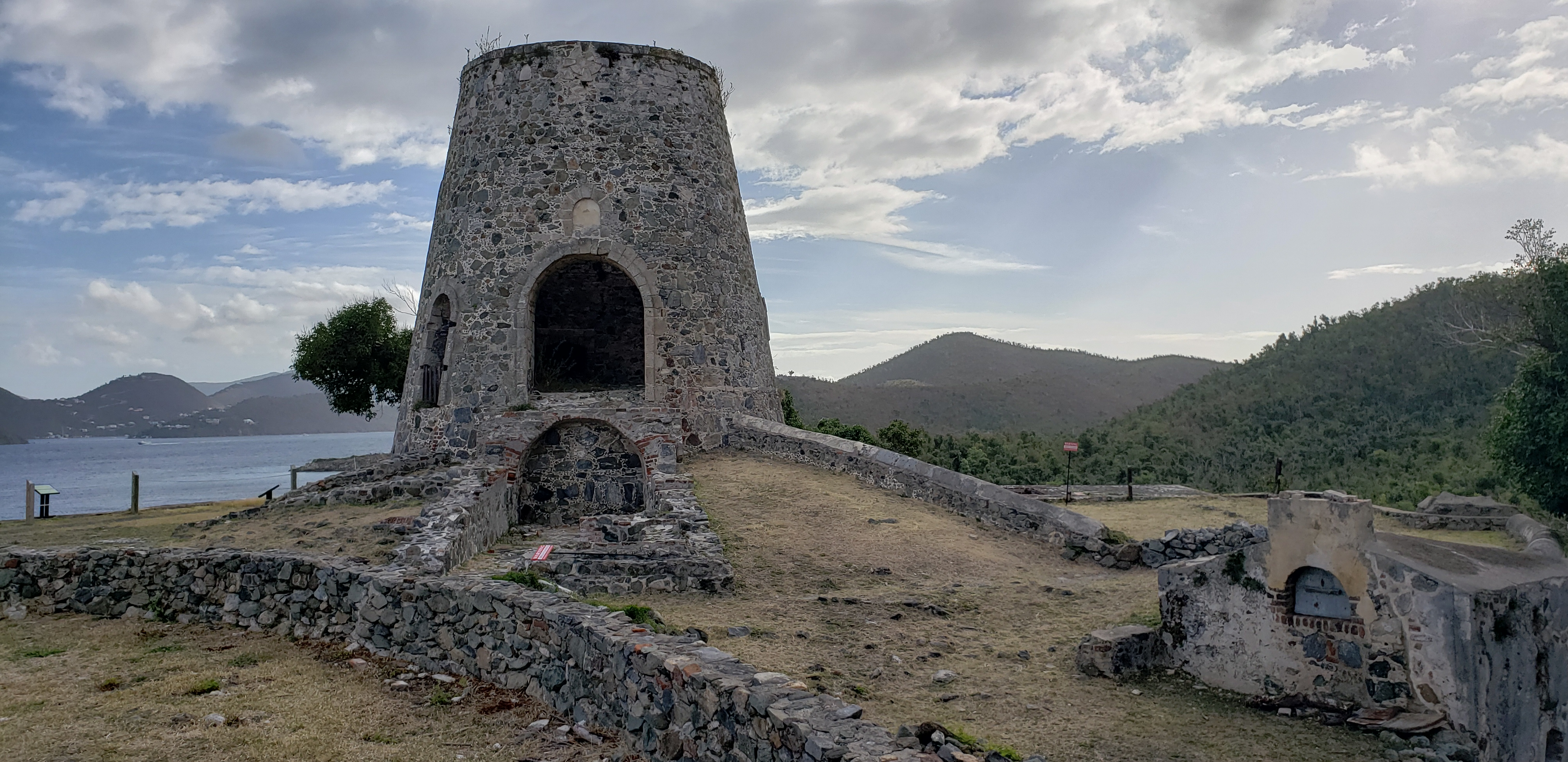
Annaberg Plantation Windmill

== Bibliography ==
- U.S. Geological Survey Geographic Names Information System: Annaberg, Saint John, U.S. Virgin Islands
