= Mittleres Schwarzatal =

Municipal association in Thuringia, Germany

Coordinates: 50.633°N 11.133°E

Mittleres Schwarzatal is a former Verwaltungsgemeinschaft ("municipal association") in the district Saalfeld-Rudolstadt, in Thuringia, Germany. The seat of the Verwaltungsgemeinschaft was in Sitzendorf. It was disbanded in January 2019.

The Verwaltungsgemeinschaft Mittleres Schwarzatal consisted of the following municipalities:

1. Allendorf
2. Bechstedt
3. Döschnitz
4. Dröbischau
5. Mellenbach-Glasbach
6. Meura
7. Oberhain
8. Rohrbach
9. Schwarzburg
10. Sitzendorf
11. Unterweißbach
