= Bergbahnregion/Schwarzatal =

Coordinates: 50°35′N 11°09′E

Bergbahnregion/Schwarzatal is a former Verwaltungsgemeinschaft ("municipal association") in the district Saalfeld-Rudolstadt, in Thuringia, Germany. The seat of the Verwaltungsgemeinschaft was in Oberweißbach. It was disbanded in January 2019.

The Verwaltungsgemeinschaft Bergbahnregion/Schwarzatal consisted of the following municipalities:

1. Cursdorf
2. Deesbach
3. Katzhütte
4. Meuselbach-Schwarzmühle
5. Oberweißbach
