= Oberweißbach =

- Ortsteil of Schwarzatal
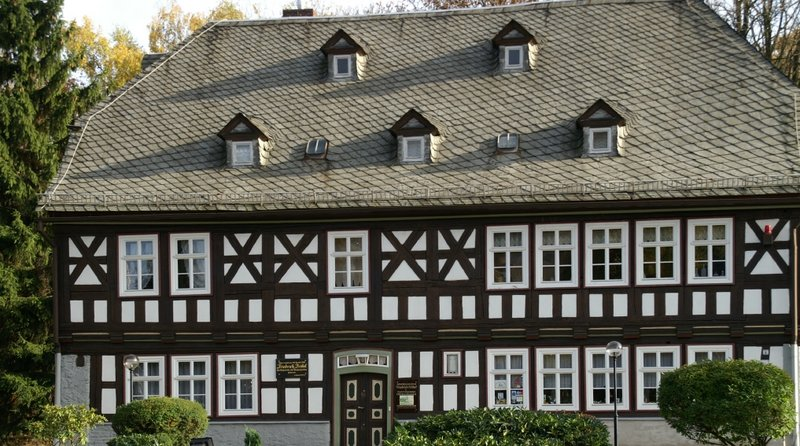
- Friedrich Fröbel's birthplace in Oberweißbach

- Coat of arms
- Interactive map of Oberweißbach
- Location within Germany Location within Thuringia
- Coordinates: 50°34′58″N 11°8′40″E
- Country: Germany
- State: Thuringia
- District: Saalfeld-Rudolstadt
- Town: Schwarzatal

Area
  - Total: 9.65 km^{2} (3.73 sq mi)
- Elevation: 670 m (2,200 ft)

Population (2017-12-31)
  - Total: 1,678
  - Density: 174/km^{2} (450/sq mi)
- Time zone: UTC+01:00 (CET)
  - Summer (DST): UTC+02:00 (CEST)
- Postal codes: 98744
- Dialling codes: 036705
- Website: Official website

Oberweißbach (or Oberweissbach, pronounced [ˌoːbɐˈvaɪsbax]; officially Oberweißbach/Thür. Wald) is a town and a former municipality in the district of Saalfeld-Rudolstadt, in Thuringia, Germany. Since 1 January 2019, it is part of the town Schwarzatal.

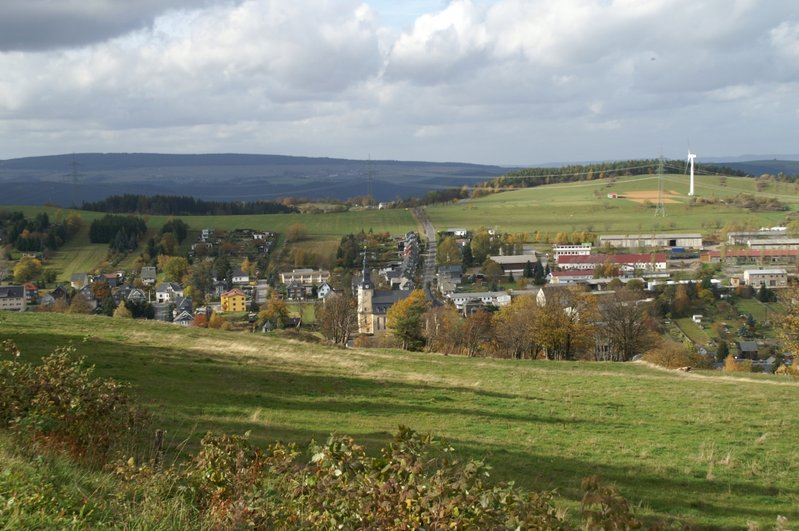
Panoramic view

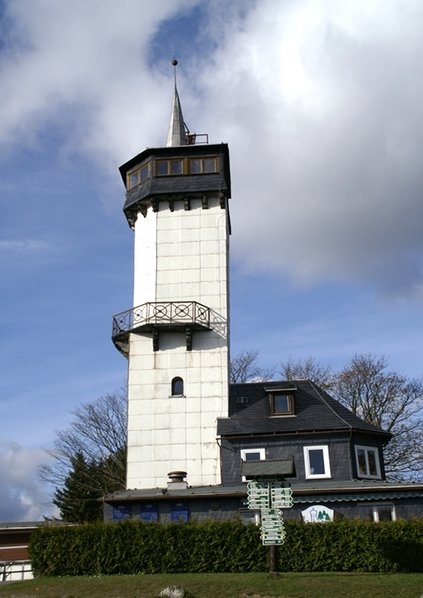
Froebeltower on the Kirchberg (785 m NN), Oberweißbach

== Geography ==
Oberweißbach is situated in the Thuringian Forest, 17 km (11 mi) southwest of Saalfeld. It is a nationally recognized resort town in the Thuringian Forest Nature Park in the Weißbachtal.

It was the seat of the former municipal administration Bergbahnregion/Schwarzatal with communities of Cursdorf, Deesbach, Katzhütte, Oberweißbach and Meuselbach-Schwarzmühle. On 1 December 2008, Oberweißbach incorporated the former municipality Lichtenhain/Bergbahn. Colloquially this area is called Raanz, based on the primary transportation method of the pharmacists, the backpack. These pharmacists shaped this region between the 16th and 20th centuries.

The town of Oberweißbach consisted of two districts:

- Oberweißbach / Thüringer Wald and
- Lichtenhain/Bergbahn.

== Notable people ==
- Rudolph Beyer, Socialist glassblower and state senator in Milwaukee – born in Oberweißbach
- Friedrich Fröbel, teacher and creator of the concept of the kindergarten – born in Oberweißbach
- Michèle Kiesewetter, police officer murdered by neo-Nazis – born in Oberweißbach
