= Carola Stauche =

German politician (born 1952)

Carola Stauche (born 1952) is a German CDU politician. She served as a member of the Landtag of Thuringia from 2004 to 2009, and as a member of the Bundestag from 2009 to 2017.

== Early life ==
Carola Stauche, née Fleischer, was born on 10 May 1952 in Arnsgereuth. After she graduated from high school in 1971, she worked in catering until 1991.

== Political career ==
In 1990, Stauche became a member of the district parliament of Saalfeld-Rudolstadt and served as mayor of Rohrbach from 1994 until 1999. From 2004 to 2009, she served as a member of the Landtag of Thuringia, taking the seat of Michael Schneider following his resignation. She was also a member of the Bundestag from 2009 to 2017 after winning the electoral district of Sonneberg – Saalfeld-Rudolstadt – Saale-Orla-Kreis in the Federal elections of 2009 and 2013.

She is evangelical and has two children.
