= Oberweißbacher Bergbahn =

Railway line in Thuringia, Germany

Coordinates: 50.5986°N 11.1306°E

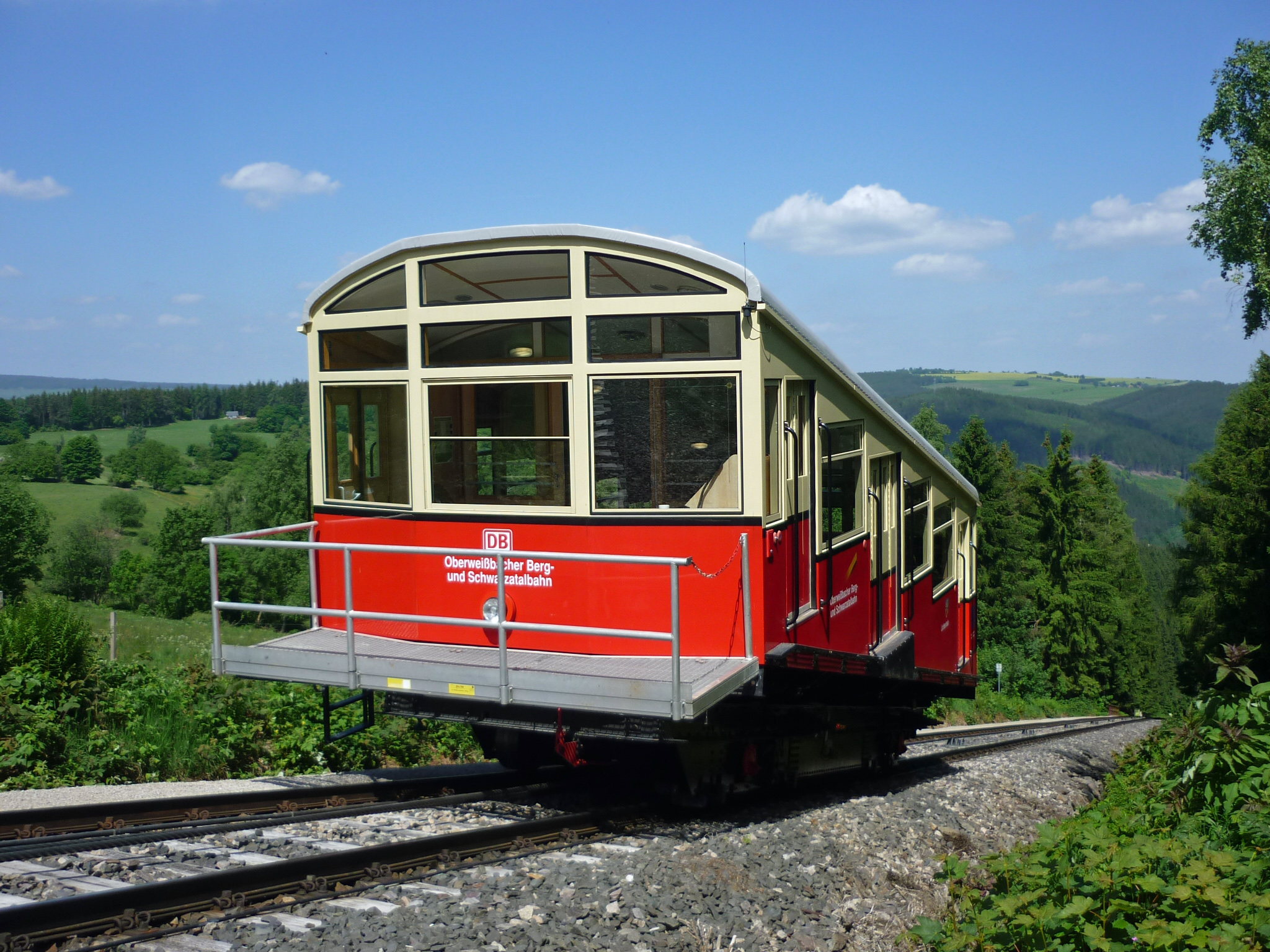
- Passenger waggon of cable railway

Service
- Route number: 563

Technical
- Line length: 3.986 km (2.477 mi)
- Track gauge: 1,800 mm (5 ft 10 7/8 in) and 1,435 mm (4 ft 8 1/2 in)
- Operating speed: 30 km/h (19 mph) max. (standard gauge section). 5.75 km/h (3.57 mph) max. (funicular section).
- Maximum incline: 25 %

The Oberweißbacher Bergbahn (German pronunciation: [ˌoːbɐˈvaɪsbaxɐ ˈbɛʁkˌbaːn], lit. 'Oberweißbach Mountain Railway') is a German railway in the Thuringian Highland, Thuringia. Since 1922 it connects Obstfelderschmiede (Mellenbach-Glasbach) with the village Lichtenhain, Oberweißbach and Cursdorf. The train consists of 1.351 km broad gauge cable railway and connects to a 2.635 km standard gauge electrified adhesion railway.

== History ==
Both railways are operationally closely linked. Since January 1982 the Oberweissbacher-Bergbahn is a historical monument. The railway is operated by Deutsche Bahn AG and offers a half-hourly service from 5:30 am to 8:00 pm. with capacity for about 30 passengers.

== Operation ==
This funicular is unusual because instead of using two purpose-built passenger vehicles, it only features one. The other vehicle is a flat wagon that is designed to carry a single standard gauge passenger car, freight wagon or locomotive between the conventional railway systems at the bottom and the top. At the top, both vehicles pull into a passenger halt at Lichtenhain/Bergbahn, but the standard gauge track on the flat wagon can interface with the standard gauge railway.

At the bottom, there is a turnout that sends the two vehicles into separate termini. The passenger vehicle is directed into a conventional funicular passenger halt, but the flat wagon is directed to interface with a turntable on the Schwartzatalbahn adjacent to Obstfelderschmiede station. In normal day-to-day passenger service, the flatbed vehicle is loaded with a dedicated passenger car carrying the Oberweißbacher Bergbahn branding. Passenger access to this car is provided at the terminus.

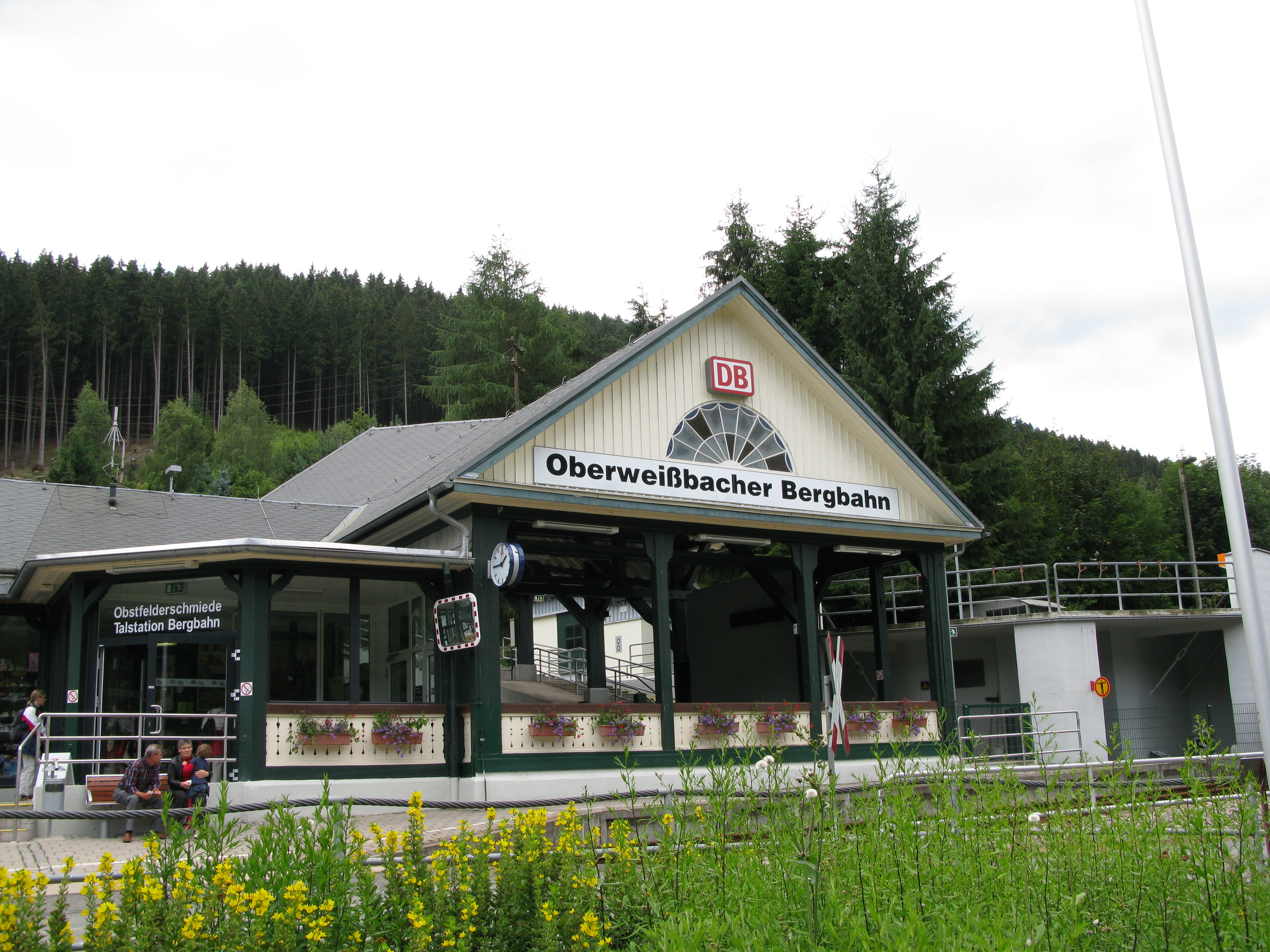
Obstfelderschmiede station

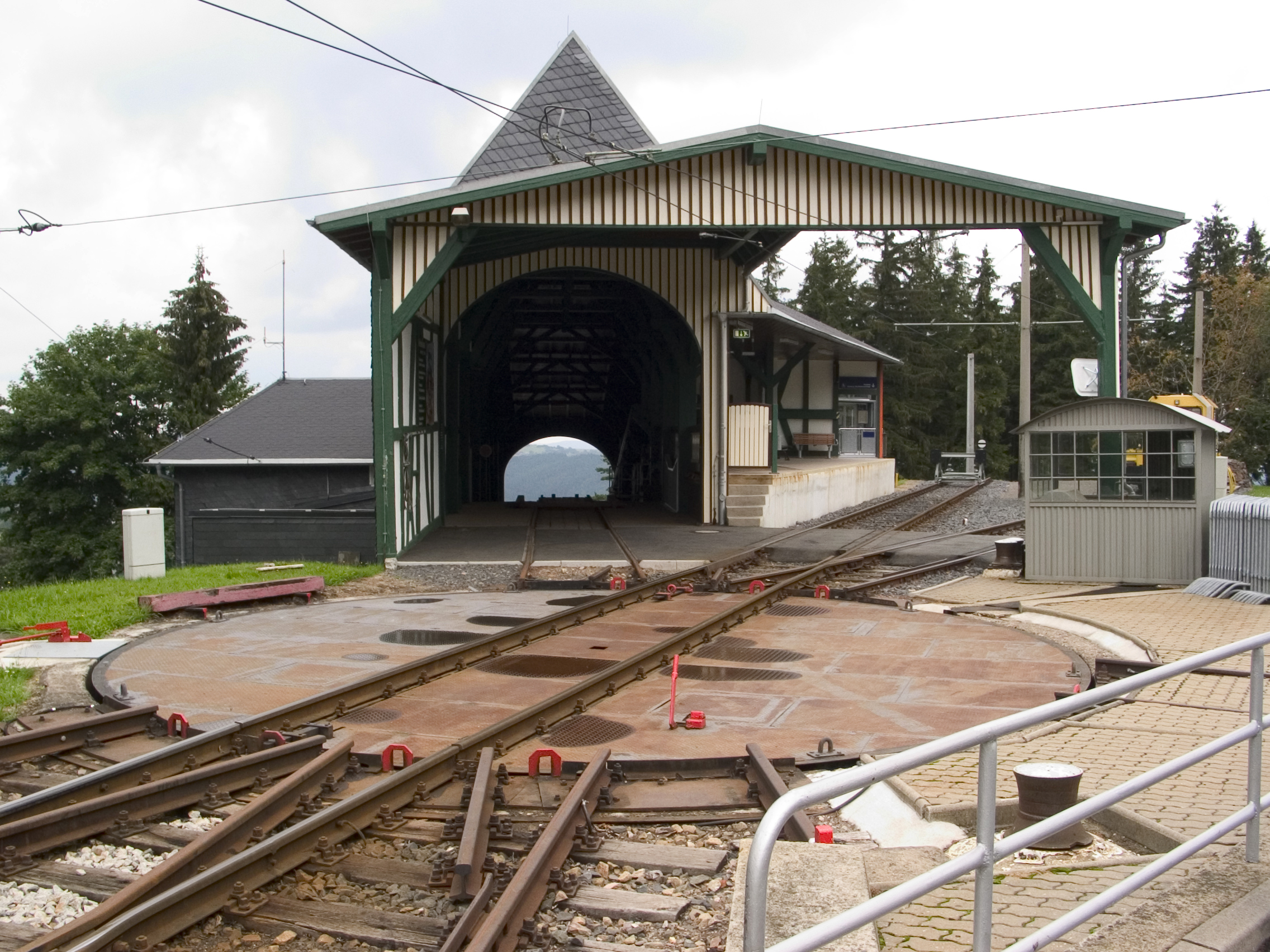
Lichtenhain station

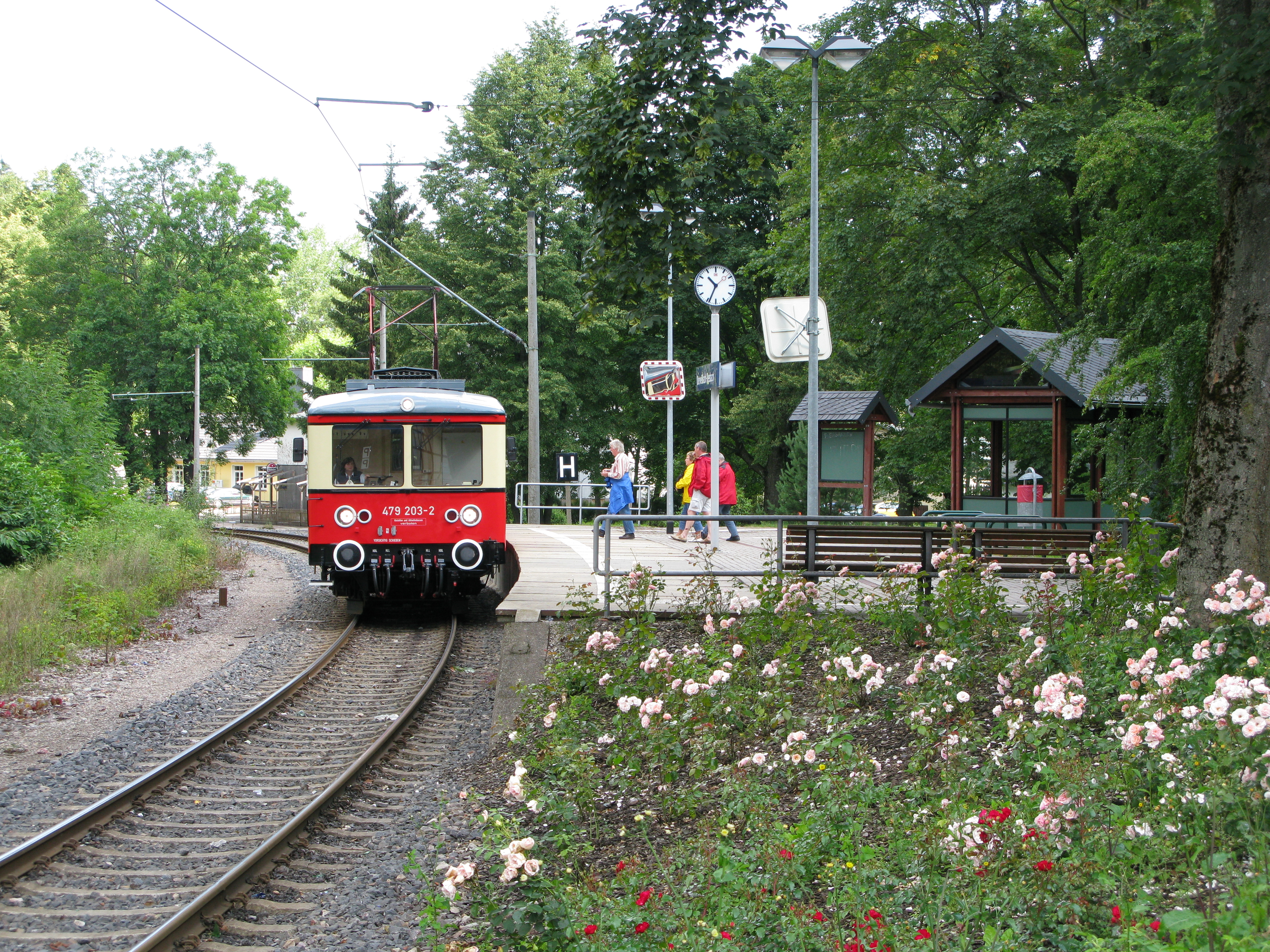
Oberweißbach station

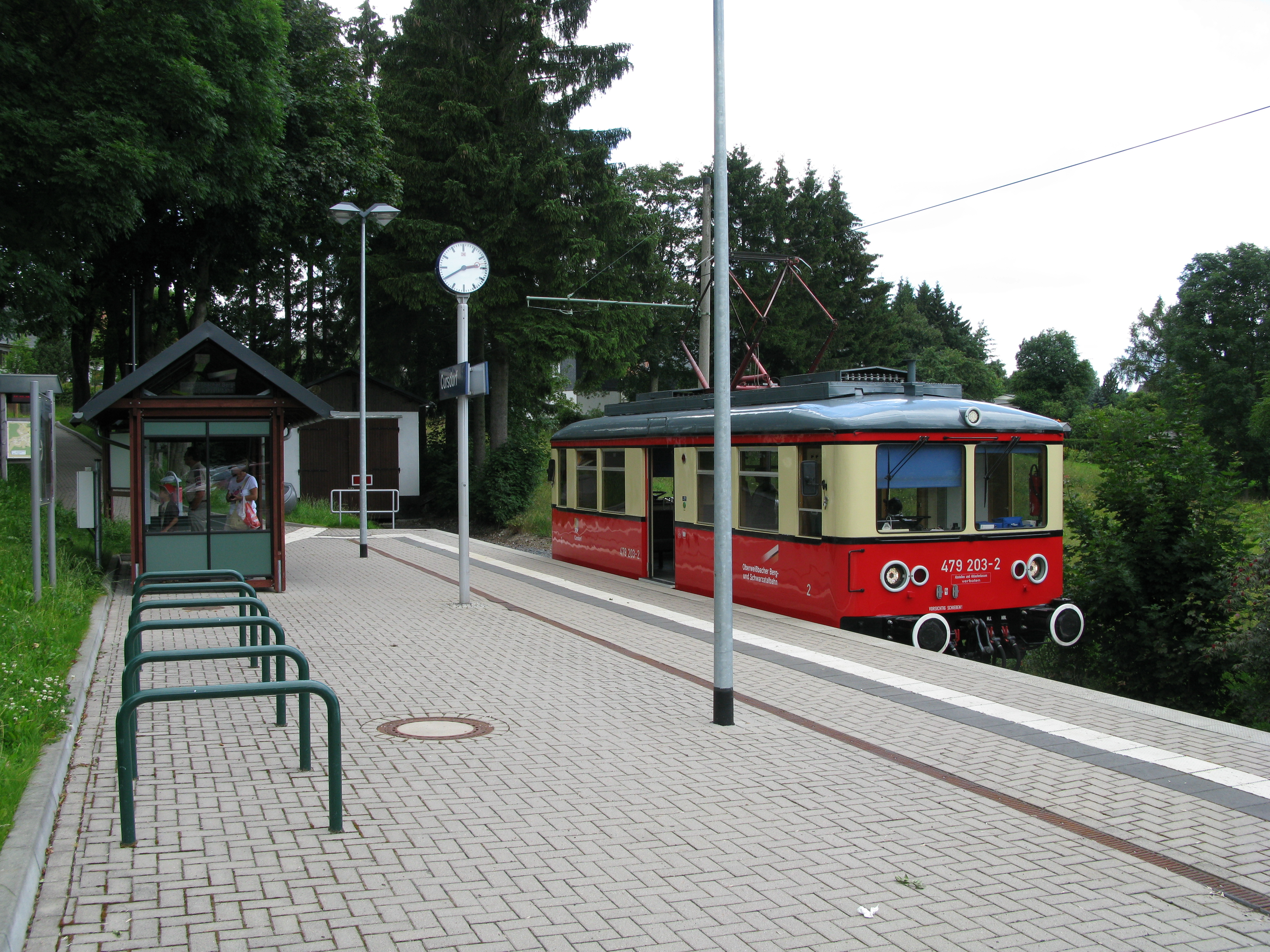
Cursdorf station

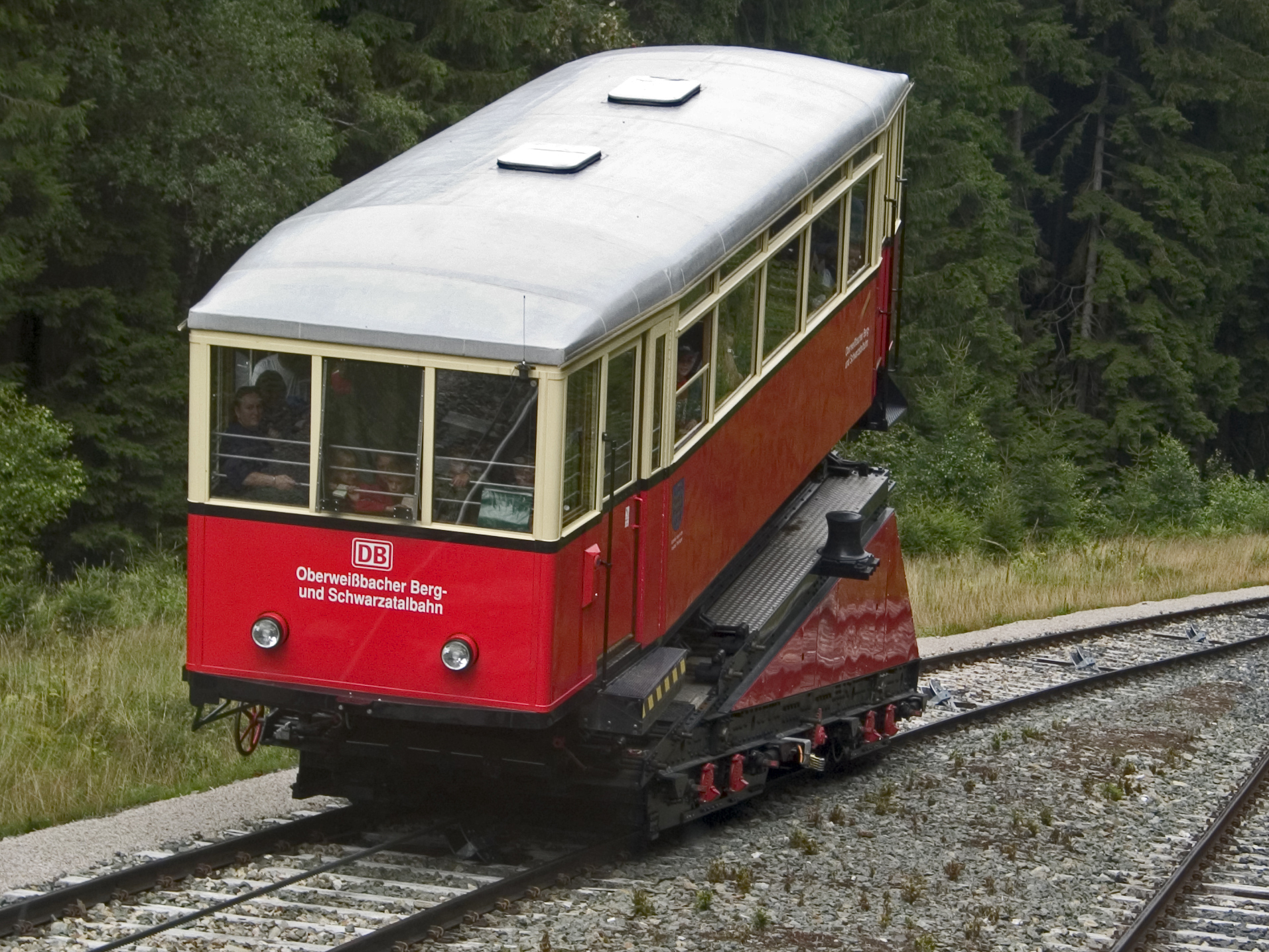
A passenger car being transported on the funicular

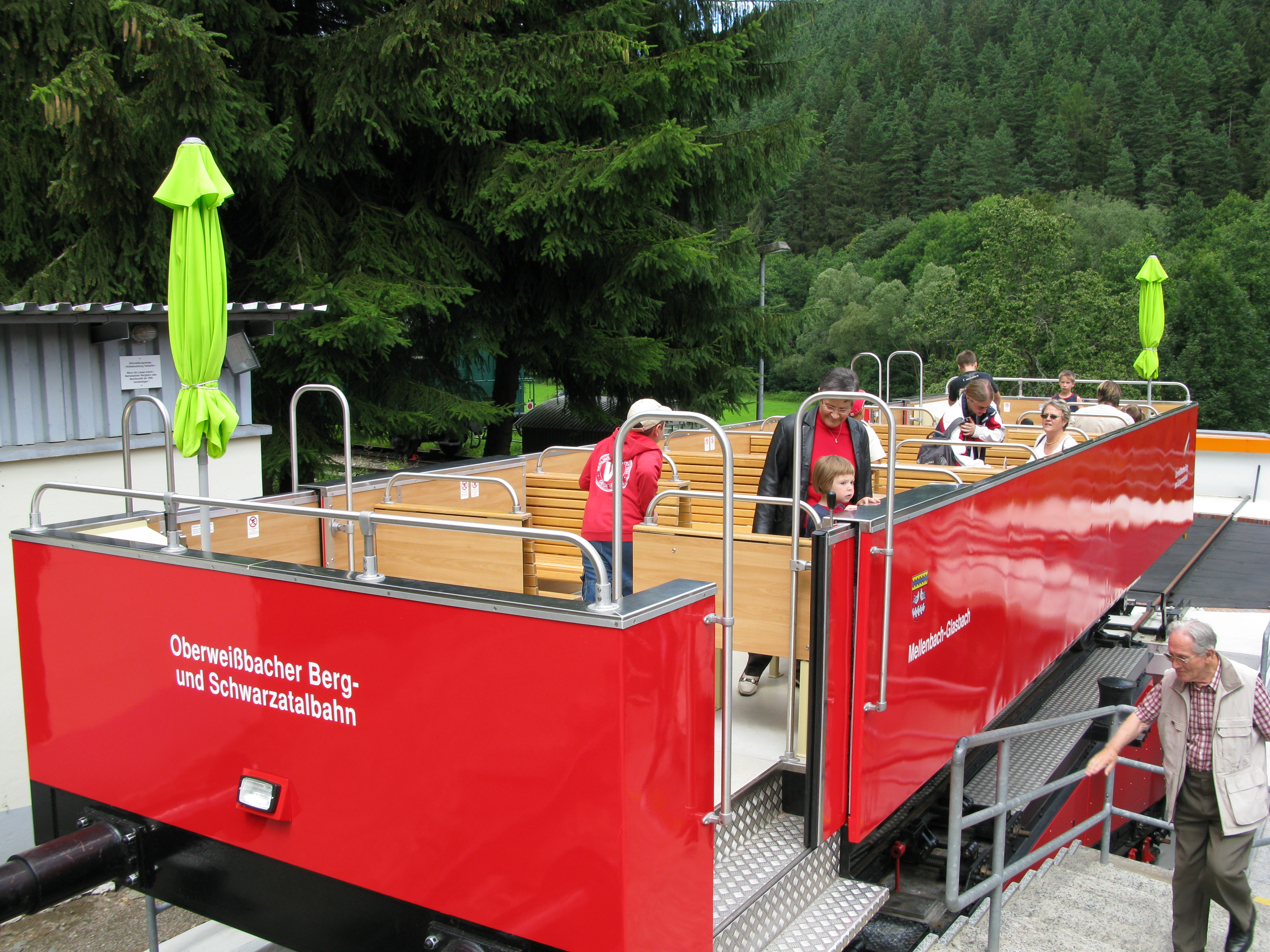
An alternative cabriolet passenger car

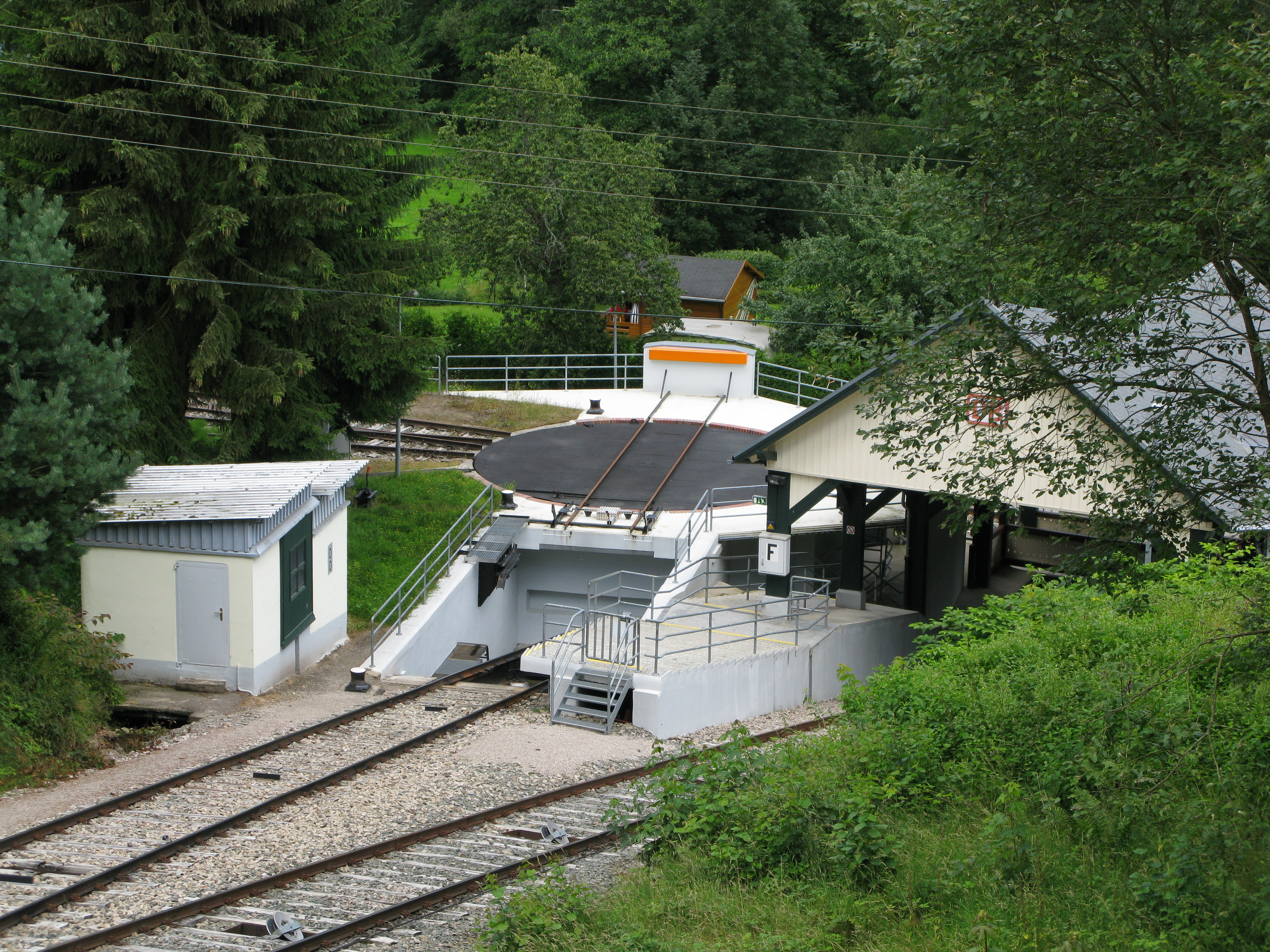
View of Obstfeldschmiede termini showing the turntable
