= Lichtenhain/Bergbahn =

- Village of Oberweißbach
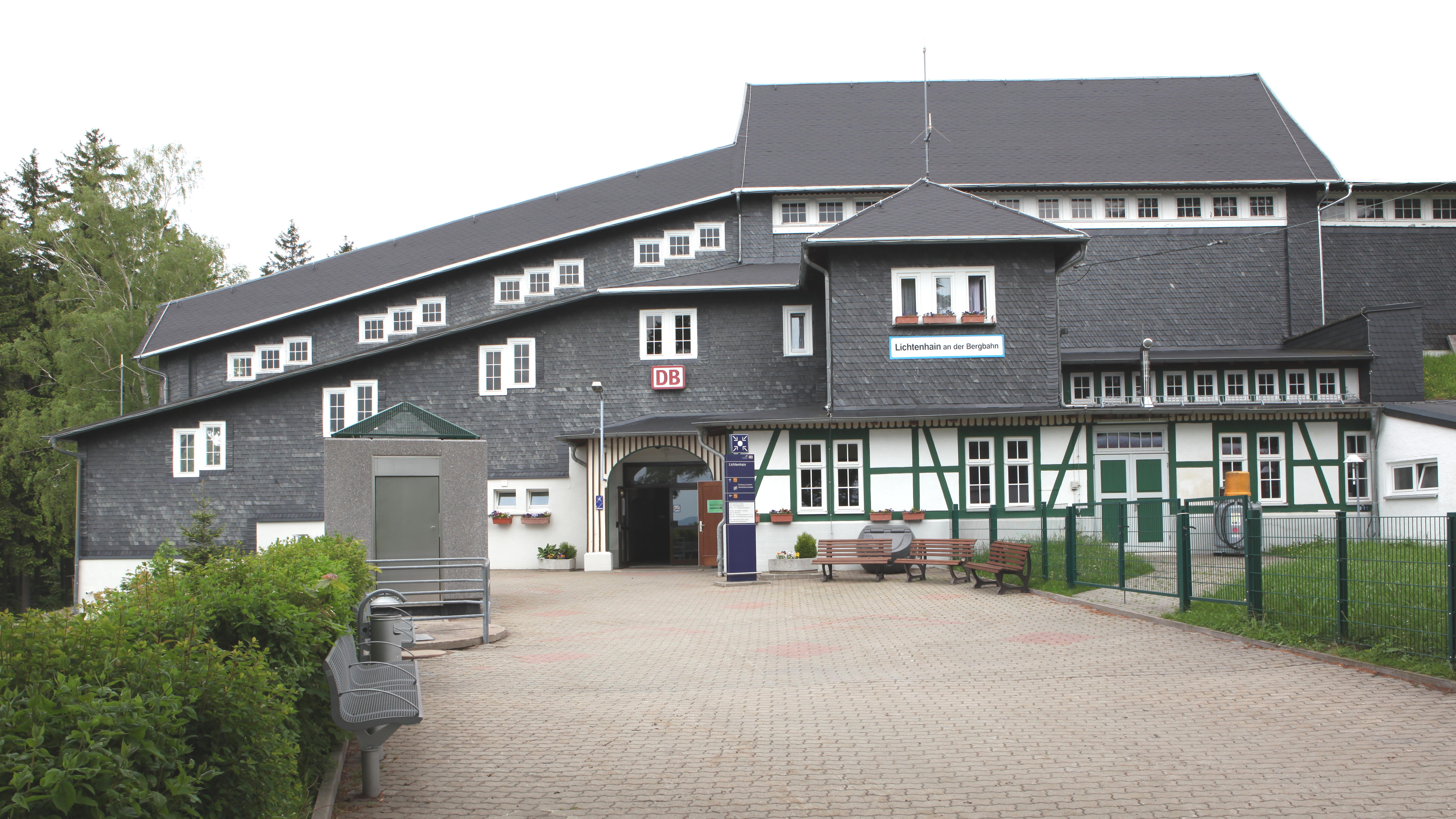
- Station of Lichtenhain/Bergbahn

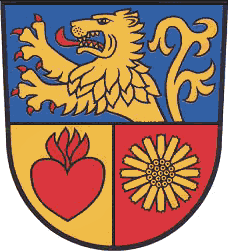
- Coat of arms
- Interactive map of Lichtenhain/Bergbahn
- Location within Germany Location within Thuringia
- Coordinates: 50°36′N 11°8′E
- Country: Germany
- State: Thuringia
- District: Saalfeld-Rudolstadt
- Town: Oberweißbach

Area
  - Total: 3.26 km^{2} (1.26 sq mi)
- Elevation: 640 m (2,100 ft)

Population (2006-12-31)
  - Total: 351
  - Density: 108/km^{2} (279/sq mi)
- Time zone: UTC+01:00 (CET)
  - Summer (DST): UTC+02:00 (CEST)
- Postal codes: 98744
- Dialling codes: 036705
- Website: Official website

Lichtenhain/Bergbahn is a former municipality in the district Saalfeld-Rudolstadt, in Thuringia, Germany. Since 1 December 2008, it is part of Oberweißbach.

== History ==
Lichtenhain/Bergbahn was first mentioned in 1455 and is located on the ancient trade route from Erfurt to Nuremberg. It once belonged to the sovereignty of Schwarzburg-Rudolstadt, later to the Principality of Schwarzburg-Rudolstadt. In the Thirty Years' War the town was completely devastated. The main source of income of the residents was originally forestry, charcoal burning and resin extraction. Later the trading of nature medicines ("Olitäten") became a major economic driver. In 1812 Lichtenhain/Bergbahn counted 375 inhabitants which rose to 524 in 1902. In 1923, the Oberweißbacher mountain railway opened which connected Lichtenhain with national railway network. Major industries in modern times were the glass industry and the thermometer production, after the Second World War, increasingly tourism.

The municipality Lichtenhain/Bergbahn was disbanded on 1 December 2008 and incorporated into the city of Oberweißbach. with administrative headquarters in Oberweißbach.

== Politics ==
The Council of the municipality Lichtenhain/Bergbahn consisted recently (as of the municipal election on 27 June 2004) of 6 Women and councilors.

- SPD 3 seats
- FW 3 seats

Ingo Lödel, the last honorary mayor, was elected on 27 June 2004.

== Coat of arms ==
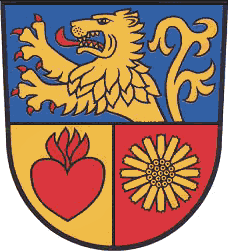
Blazon: "Divided and split half; up in blue a rising golden lion with red knocked-tongue and reinforcement, bottom front in gold a red heart with red flames, down the back in red a golden arnica montana."
Description: The coat of arms was designed by Frank Heraldiker Diemar and approved by the Thuringian State Administration on 30 September 1994.

== Transportation ==
Lichtenhain/Bergbahn is connected to Oberweißbacher Bergbahn which connects Obstfelderschmiede (Mellenbach-Glasbach) with the village Cursdorf. The train consists of 1.351 km broad gauge cable railway and a connecting 2.635 km standard gauge electronic adhesion railway. The railway is operated by Deutsche Bahn and offers about thirty rides every half hour from 5:30 am to 8:00 pm.

== Notable people ==
- Gerhard Botz (born 1955), Politician (SPD)

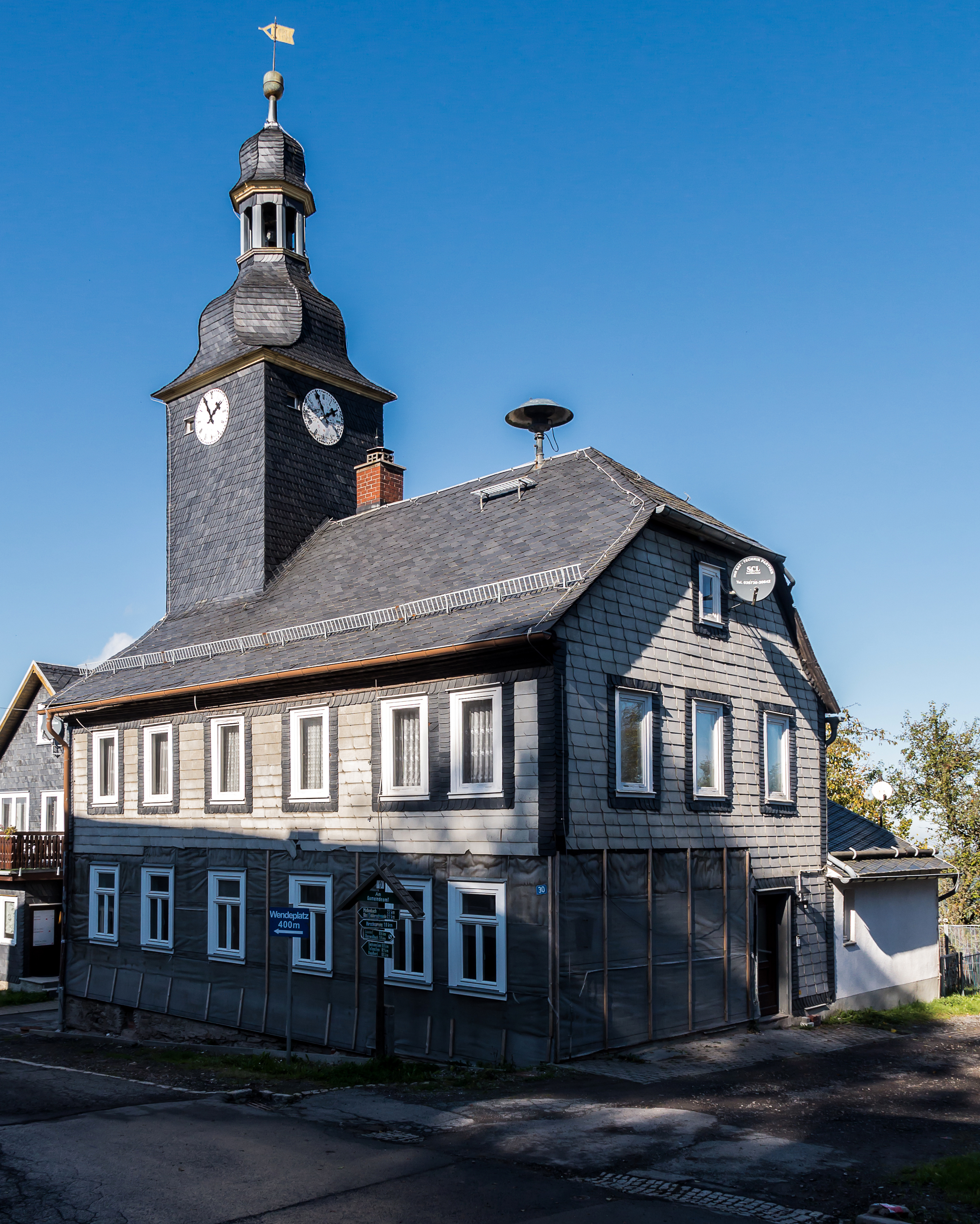
Former School, Lichtenhain/Bergbahn
