= Battle of Saalfeld =

1806 Battle during the War of the Fourth Coalition

- Part of the War of the Fourth Coalition
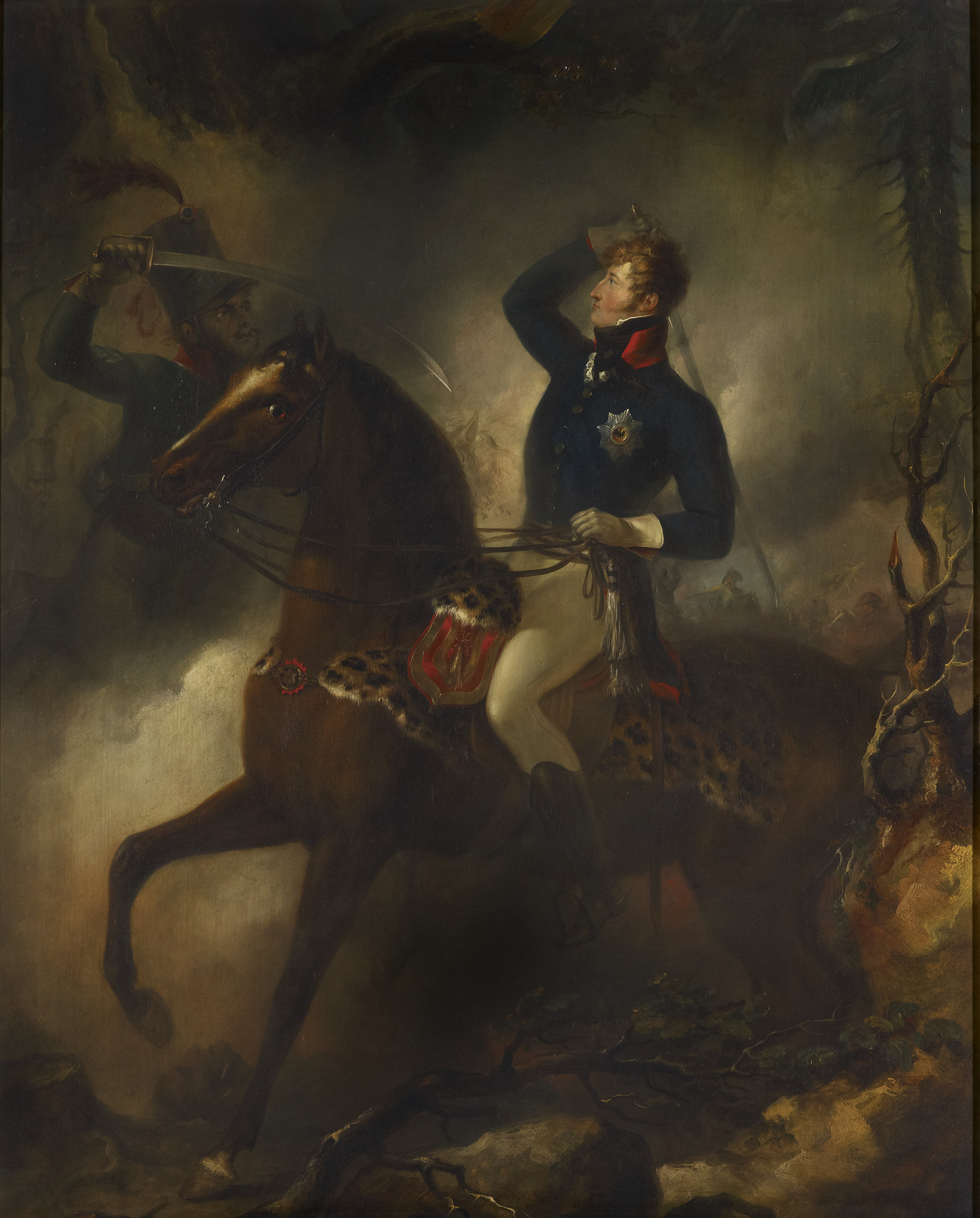
- The death of Louis Ferdinand of Prussia, by Peter Edward Stroehling
Date	10 October 1806
Location	Saalfeld, Germany 50.6500°N 11.3669°E
Result	French victory

Belligerents
(France) French Empire	(Kingdom of Prussia) Prussia (Electorate of Saxony) Saxony

Commanders and leaders
(France) Jean Lannes (France) Claude Victor-Perrin (France) Louis Gabriel Suchet (France) Pierre Augereau	(Kingdom of Prussia) Prince Louis Ferdinand †

Strength
12,000–12,800 men 12 guns	8,300–9,000; 44 guns

Casualties and losses
172–200 killed or wounded	900 killed or wounded 1,800 captured 33 guns (15 Prussian, 18 Saxon)

War of the Fourth Coalition
⬤ current battle
⬤ Napoleon not in command
⬤ Napoleon in command

The Battle of Saalfeld took place on 10 October 1806, at which a French force of 12,800 men commanded by Marshal Jean Lannes defeated a Prussian-Saxon force of 8,300 men under Prince Louis Ferdinand. The battle took place in Thuringia in what was the Ernestine duchy of Saxe-Coburg-Saalfeld. The battle was the second clash in the Prussian Campaign of the War of the Fourth Coalition.

== Background ==
=== French Movements ===
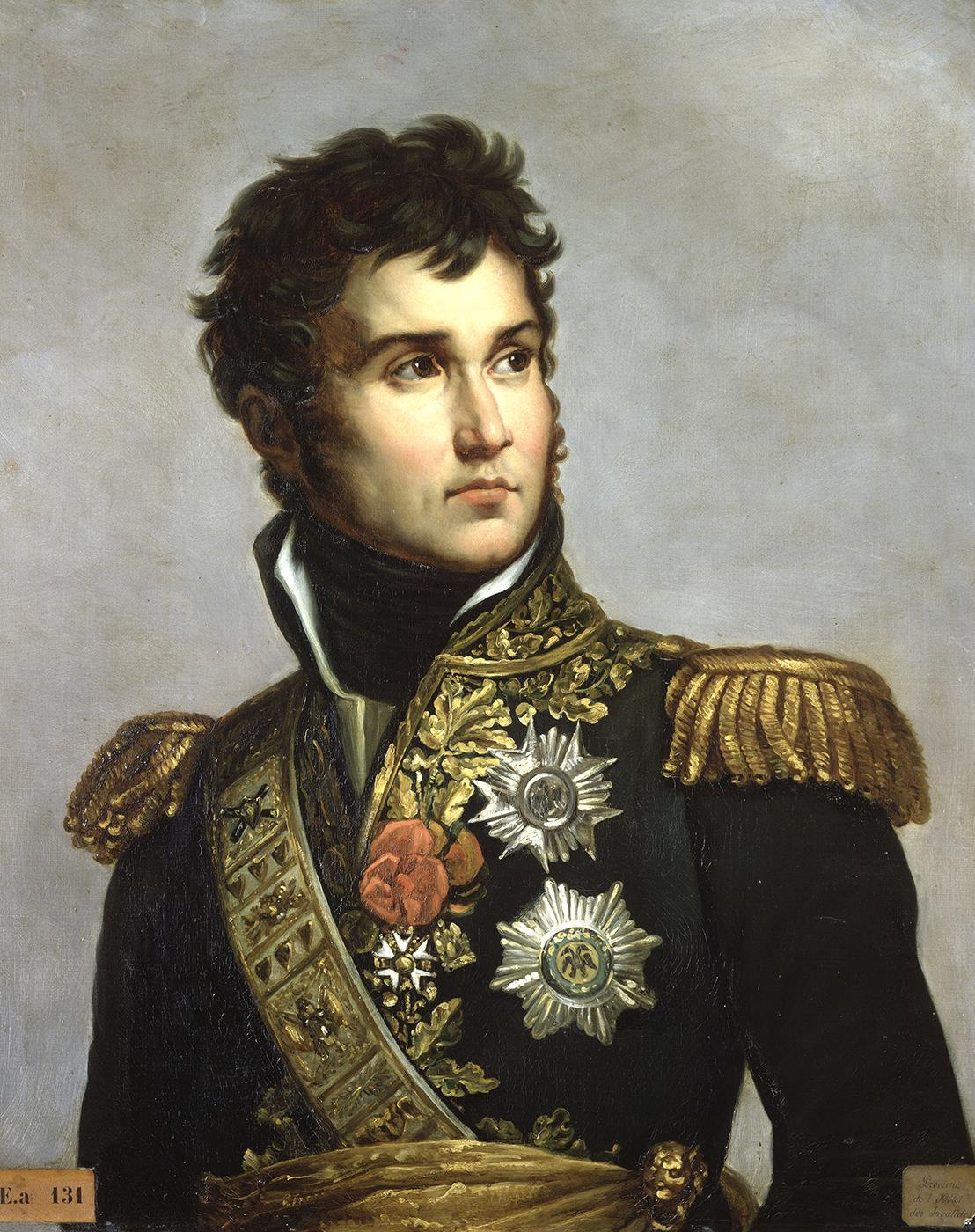
Jean Lannes

Napoleon had arranged the Grande Armée into three columns to cross the Thuringian Forest to attack the Prussian-Saxon army. The westernmost column was headed by V Corps commanded by Jean Lannes, with Pierre Augereau's VII Corps following behind. They had orders to march from Coburg via Gräfenthal due at Saalfeld on 11 October. V Corps set out on 8 October, and by the end of 9 October was at Gräfenthal with light cavalry on the road to Saalfeld. At 5 am on 10 October, Lannes with Louis-Gabriel Suchet's division and Anne-François-Charles Trelliard brigade of light cavalry of V corps began advancing down the road to Saalfeld, aware that a Prussian-Saxon force was in front of them.

=== Prussian-Saxon movements ===
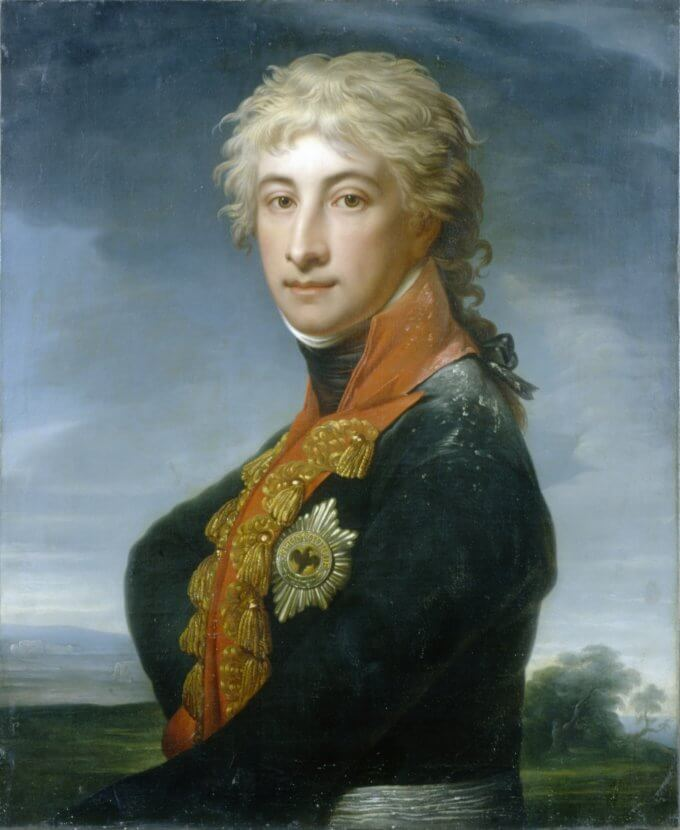
Prince Louis Ferdinand of Prussia

Prince Louis Ferdinand commanded the Advanced Guard of Frederick Louis, Prince of Hohenlohe-Ingelfingen's army and on 9 October the Prince his headquarters at Rudolstadt, with detachments at Saalfeld, Schwarza, and Bad Blankenburg. The Prince had received a message from Hohenlohe that the Prussian-Saxon army would be advancing across the River Saale to support Bogislav Friedrich Emanuel von Tauentzien's force after the Battle of Schleiz, and that Duke of Brunswick-Wolfenbüttel's main army would be advancing to Rudolstadt. In the evening of 9 October Oberst Leopold Ludwig Maximilian Nordeck zu Rabenau (who commanded a detachment at Saalfeld) reported to Prince Louis that a French column of between 16,000 and 20,000 men had left Coburg heading for Saalfeld and that a post of 30 hussars stationed at Gräfenthal and the Jäger Company "Valentini" stationed at Hoheneiche had both retreated to Arnsgereuth after clashing with the French. Knowing that the main body of the army under Hohenlohe was due to advance across the River Saale on 10 October, Prince Louis therefore decided that his forces needed to stop the French column from either crossing the Saale at Saalfeld and interfering with Hohenlohe’s movements or from moving up the western side of the Saale to Rudolstadt, which they would reach before Brunswick’s army. During 9 October a fusilier company commanded by August von Gneisenau was sent to Arnsgereuth to support the troops there, and having confirmed that the French were advancing on Saalfeld and in strength, the Prussian troops withdrew from Arnsgereuth to Lerchenhügel, just outside Saalfeld, with advance posts in Garnsdorf.

At 7 am Prince Louis began concentrating his troops at Saalfeld, and by 9 am he had arranged his forces for battle. The troops were arranged in a line stretching from in front of Saalfeld to behind Crösten and Beulwitz facing the woods the covered the hills above Saalfeld and the Saale valley. The Prince left Generalmajor Karl Gerhard von Pelet's detachment at Blankenburg.

== Battle ==
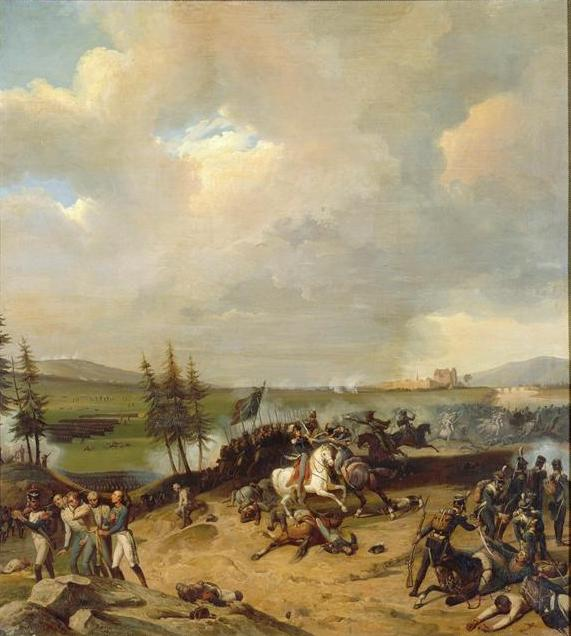
Battle of Saalfeld

At around 9.45 AM, the advance guard of V Corps, consisting of the corps' Bataillon d'élite (formed of the elite companies of battalions left at depots), the 17th Légère Regiment, and two cannons, made its way towards Saalfeld and occupied the heights overlooking the town. The French light cavalry brigade and the advanced guard began to engage the Prussian-Saxon army. The Bataillon d'élite supported by French skirmishers pushed out the Prussian troops from Garnsdorf and occupied it. As the French troops advanced and the Prussian-Saxon army prepared to fight them, Marshal Lannes noticed that the right flank of the Prussian-Saxon army was completely uncovered, and while the cavalry and French advanced guard engaged the Prussians around Garnsdorf and Saalfeld, he ordered rest of Suchet's division to march northwards through the woods to outflank the Prussian and Saxon line. To cover these moves, the 17th Légère Regiment formed a skirmish line that extended from Saalfeld to Beulwitz.

Prince Louis was aware that he was engaged with a larger force, and then at 11 am, Saxon Souslieutnant Heinrich August von Egidy brought a verbal order from Prince Hohenlohe to remain at Rudolstadt and that the offensive across the Saale had been abandoned. Prince Louis decided to try and disengage with the French and retreat to Rudolstadt. He ordered second battalion of the "Müffling" Regiment to Schwarza to hold the bridges, and sent troops under the Saxon Generalmajor Friedrich Joseph von Bevilaqua to extend the right of his line to the hills either side of Aue am Berg (known as the Oberhayn and Sandberg). He also ordered the "Prince Xaver" and "Kurfürst" regiments to take the offensive by attacking the plain between Siechentbal and the Kesselthal streams. The skirmishers of the 17th Légère Regiment supported with the 34th Ligne Regiment (which had moved out of the woods into Beulwitz) repelled the Saxon regiments, who then fell back in disorder. Prince Louis rallied these troops, and fearing that he would lose communication with General Bevilaqua and his troops, he ordered another attack, and by midday the "Kurfürst" regiment had captured Crösten. Thinking that his centre was secure, Prince Louis gave further orders for a withdrawal. The French had entered Saalfeld and were pushing the Prussian troops back to Wöhlsdorf, where Prince Louis headed to rally these troops.

Maps of the Battle of Saalfeld

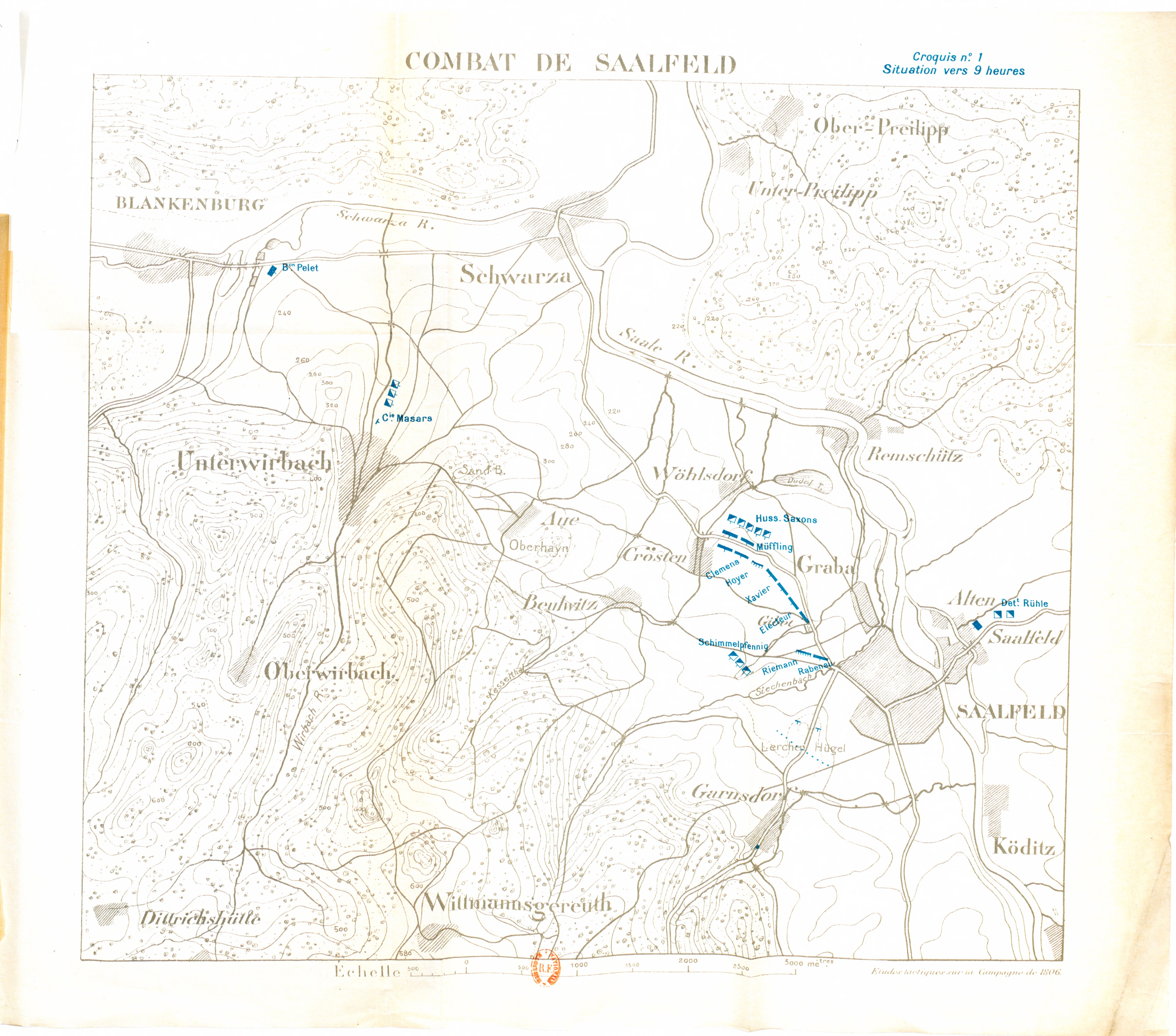
9AM

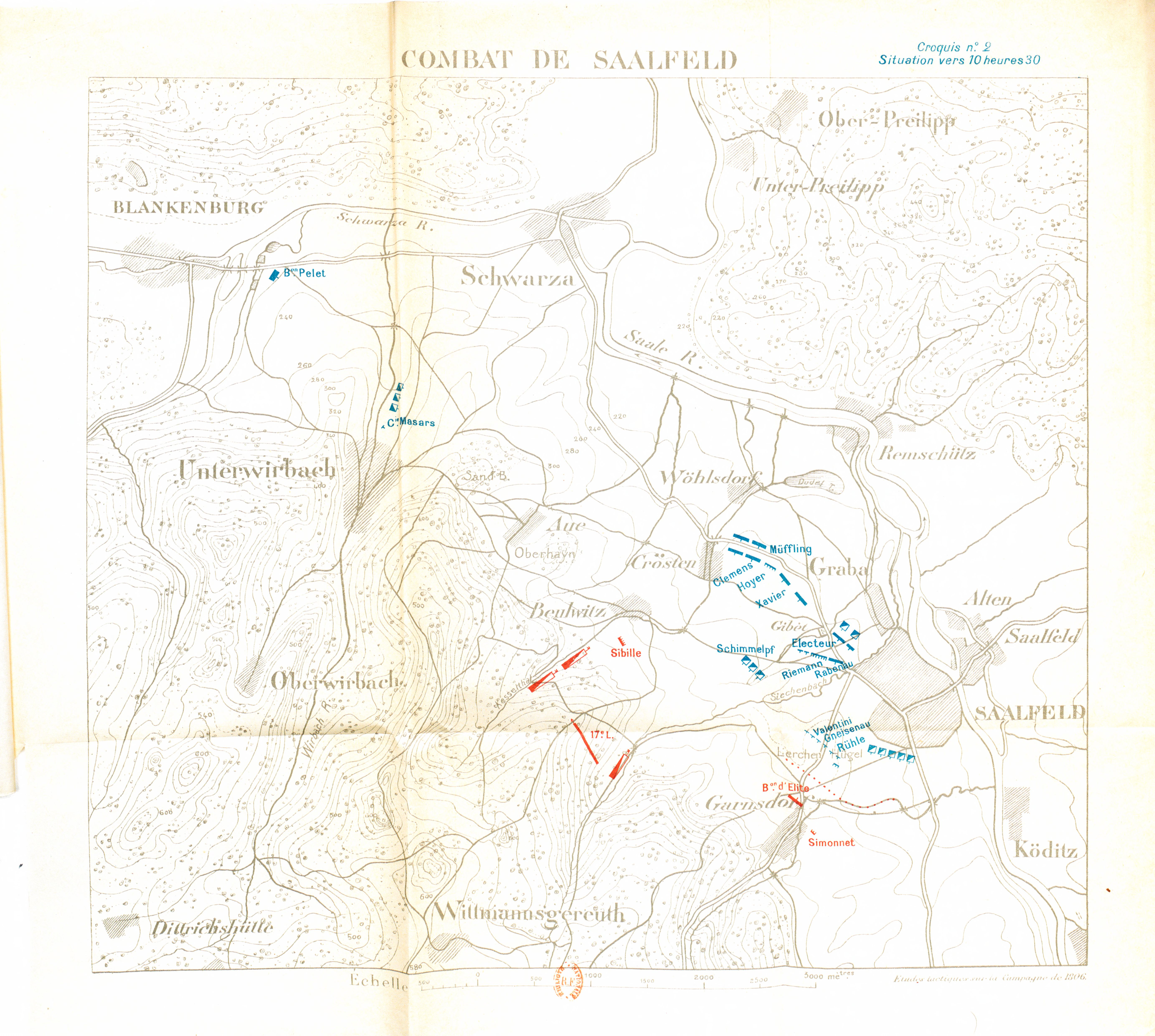
10.30AM

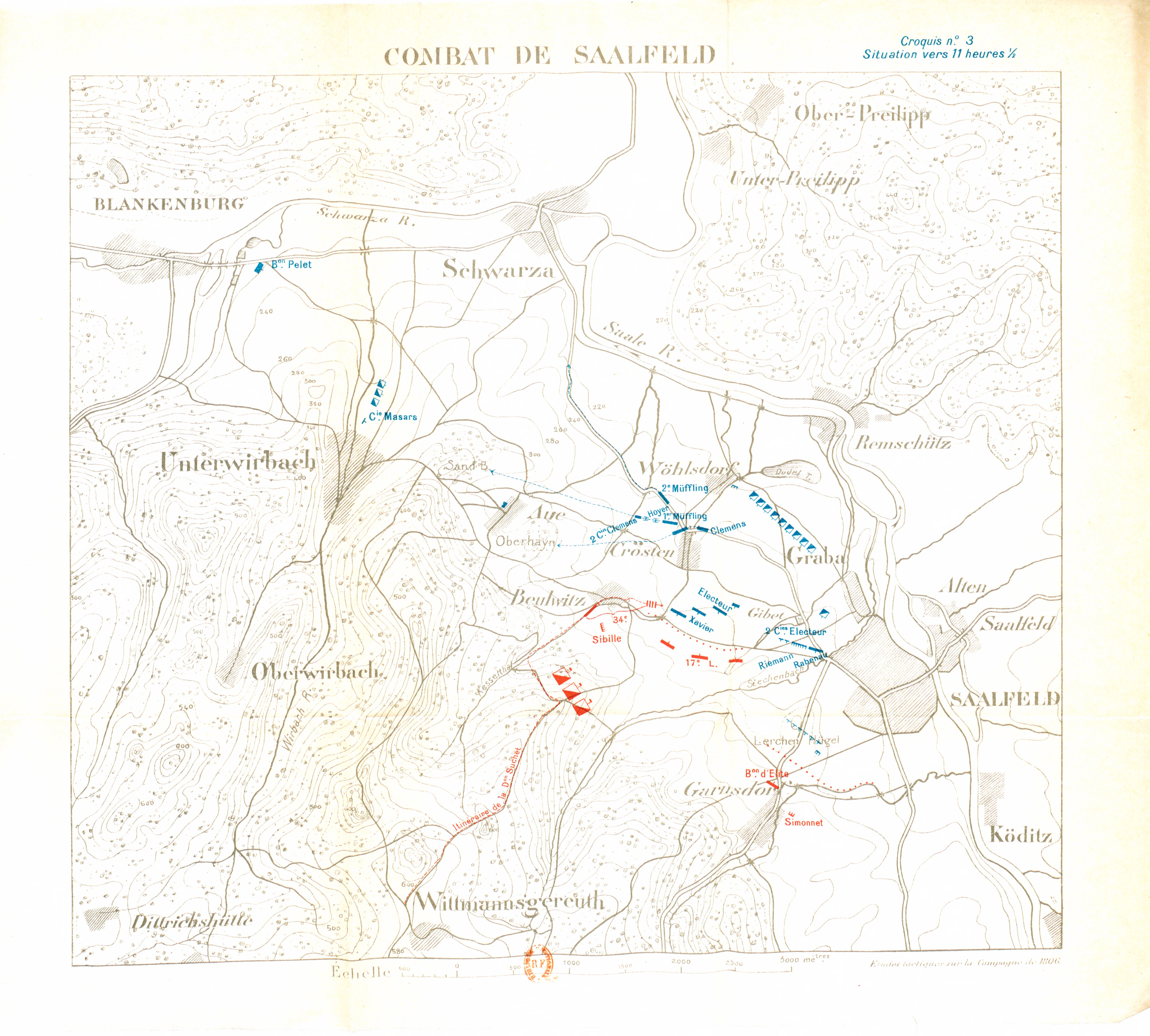
11.30AM

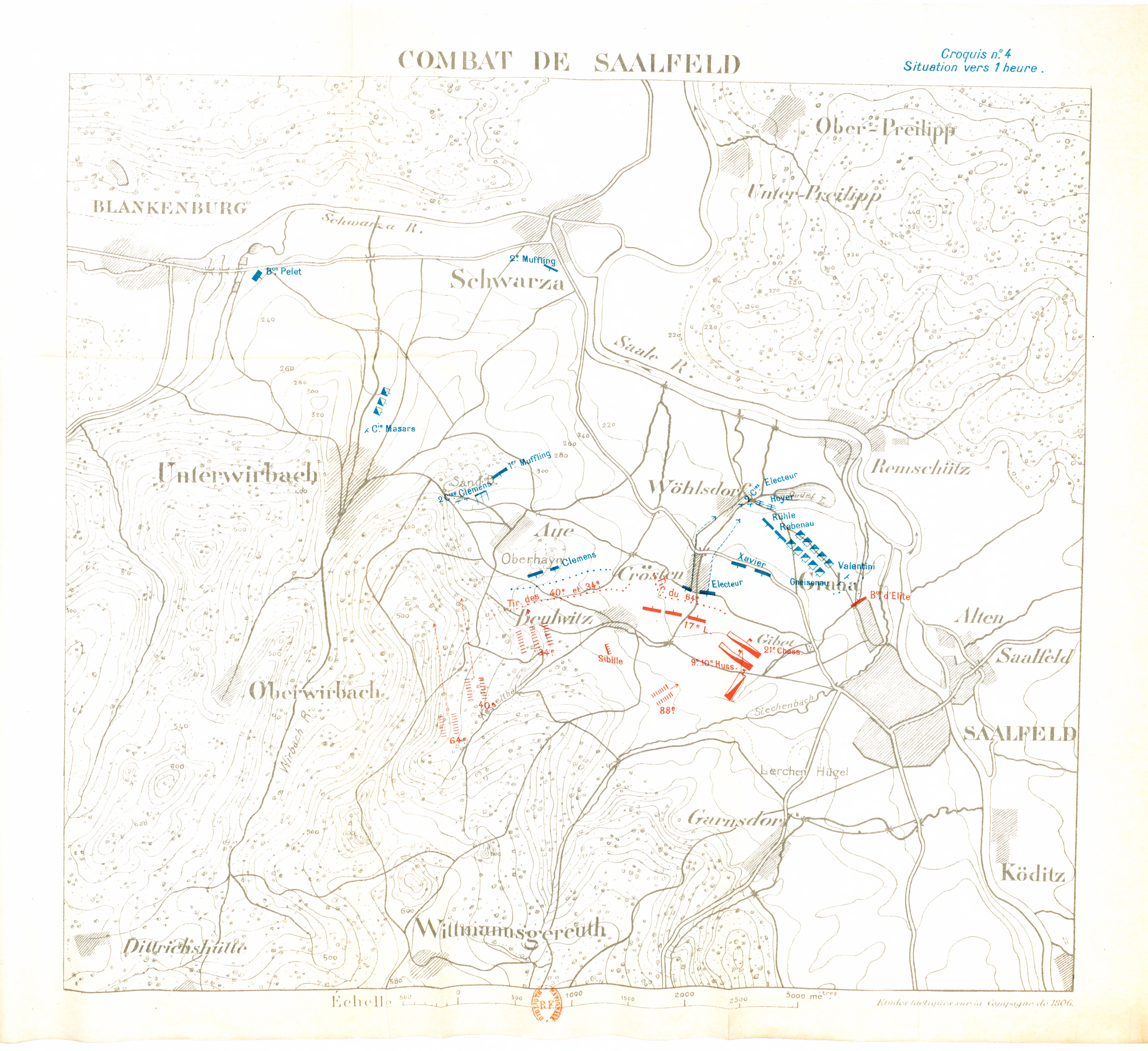
1PM

At just before 1 pm, Marshal Lannes gave the signal for the offensive. The 34th, 40th, and 64th Ligne headed towards the Saxon troops around Aue am Berg, whilst the French cavalry, with the 88th Ligne behind them, moved forward between Crösten and Saalfeld. Prince Louis decided this was a moment to engage the French cavalry with the Prussian and Saxon cavalry, attacking an exposed flank of the 21st Chasseurs à Cheval. However, the second line of French cavalry then enveloped the Prince's outnumbered cavalry line. Order in the Prussian and Saxon cavalry began to break down, and they fled joining the troops retreating from Saalfeld. In the confused mass around Wöhlsdorf, many were cut down by the French hussars and some drowned trying to escape across the Saale. The Prince and his entourage became surrounded by a group of French cavalry led by Quartermaster Jean-Baptiste Guindy. Guindy, having recognized the Prince, implored him to yield, shouting "Surrender, Colonel, or you are dead!". But having been one of the primary instigator's of Prussia's war against France, Prince Louis refused, and instead lunged at Guindy and slashed him with his saber. Guindy, the better swordsman, immediately thrust his sword into the Prince's chest, killing him on the spot.

Meanwhile, on the Prussian-Saxon right, General Bevilaqua tried to reinforce the Sandberg with the "Prinz Clemens" regiment, but then seeing the rout at Wöhlsdorf, Bevilaqua ordered a retreat to Scwharza. As the first battalion of the "Prince Clemens" Regiment moved down the slope it was attacked repeatedly by the 21st Chasseurs à Cheval, and the Saxons broke under the onslaught. the 21st Chasseurs à Cheval then assaulted and successively broke the second battalion "Prinz Clemens" Regiment and first battalion "Müffling" Regiment. As these troops dispersed, General Bevilaqua was captured.

There was a final conflict at Schwarza and Pelet's force engaged the French around Unter-Wirbach. Pelet's force was largely intact but had to retreat to Stadt-Ilm, which it reached at 10 pm. The French cavalry pursued the remains of the Prussian and Saxon units to Rudolstadt, but the French infantry halted at Schwarza. Some of the Prussian and Saxon troops that had escaped onto the east side of the Saale withdrew towards Rudolstadt.

== Aftermath ==
Prince Louis' force had been completely dispersed as a fighting force. Only Pelet's detachment was intact, and they were forced to take a long route to rejoin Hohenlohe.

Despite this battle and the battle of Schleiz, Napoleon was still not fully aware of location of the Prussian army. After four days of further marches, the French engaged the Prussians and Saxons at the twin battles of Jena and Auerstedt on the plateau west of the river Saale.

A memorial stone commemorates the site of the battle and Prince Louis Ferdinand's death. The plaque reads "Here Prince Louis Ferdinand of Prussia fell fighting for his grateful Fatherland on 10 October 1806".

== See also ==
Colours of "Müffling", "Kurfürst", and "Prince Clemens" regiments.

== Maps of the Battle ==
- Napoleon Series Map Archives
- Maps of the Battle

== Media ==
- Rugendas, Johan Lorenz, II, "Mort du Prince Louis de Prusse, près de Saalfeld" (1799). Prints, Drawings and Watercolors from the Anne S.K. Brown Military Collection. Brown Digital Repository. Brown University Library.
- Chéreau, J., "Combat de Saalfeld. Mort du Prince Louis de Prusse: 10 8bre 1806 " (1806). Prints, Drawings and Watercolors from the Anne S.K. Brown Military Collection. Brown Digital Repository. Brown University Library
- "Le Prince Louis de Prusse.: Qui commandait l'avant garde du Prince Hohenloe, le 10 octobre 1806, à Saalfeld... " Prints, Drawings and Watercolors from the Anne S.K. Brown Military Collection. Brown Digital Repository. Brown University Library
- "Tod des Prinzen Louis Ferdinand von Preussen" Prints, Drawings and Watercolors from the Anne S.K. Brown Military Collection. Brown Digital Repository. Brown University Library
- Bell, "The Hero Was Mortal", 1807, Royal Collections Trust
- Peter Edward Stroehling (1768-c. 1826), "The Death of Prince Louis Ferdinand of Prussia (1772-1806)", c.1806-16, Royal Collections Trust
- Francois Pigeot, "Death Of Prince Louis Of Prussia At The Battle of Saalfeld", 1850, Getty Images
- Tranié, Jean (1984). Napoléon et l'Allemagne, Prusse 1806. Lavauzelle. ISBN 9782702500859.

Preceded by Battle of Schleiz	Napoleonic Wars; Battle of Saalfeld	Succeeded by Battle of Jena–Auerstedt
