= Allendorf =

Allendorf may refer to the following places:

- In Germany:
  - Allendorf, Gießen, a town in the Gießen district, Hesse
  - Allendorf, Waldeck-Frankenberg, a municipality in the Waldeck-Frankenberg district, Hesse
  - Allendorf, Rhein-Lahn, a municipality in Rhineland-Palatinate
  - Allendorf, Thuringia, a municipality in Thuringia
  - Bad Sooden-Allendorf, a town in the Werra-Meißner district, Hesse
  - Sundern-Allendorf, part of Sundern in North Rhine-Westphalia
  - Stadtallendorf, in Hesse (historically: Allendorf)
- The German name for Aloja, a city in Latvia
- In the United States:
  - Allendorf, Iowa

...
