= Schwarzburg =

Schwarzburg may refer to:

- Schwarzburg (municipality)
- The House of Schwarzburg
- Schwarzburg-Rudolstadt
- Schwarzburg-Sondershausen
- 13th-century fortress built by the Teutonic Order in Transylvania, present day Codlea
