= Kamsdorf =

Village in Saalfeld-Rudolstadt, Thuringia, Germany

- Ortsteil of Unterwellenborn
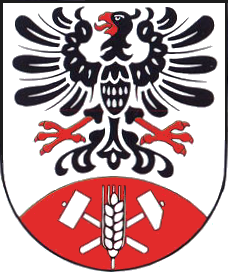
- Coat of arms
- Interactive map of Kamsdorf
- Location within Germany Location within Thuringia
- Coordinates: 50°38′41″N 11°26′41″E
- Country: Germany
- State: Thuringia
- District: Saalfeld-Rudolstadt
- Municipality: Unterwellenborn

Area
  - Total: 6.90 km^{2} (2.66 sq mi)
- Elevation: 325–400 m (1,066–1,312 ft)

Population (2016-12-31)
  - Total: 2,653
  - Density: 384/km^{2} (996/sq mi)
- Time zone: UTC+01:00 (CET)
  - Summer (DST): UTC+02:00 (CEST)
- Postal codes: 07334
- Dialling codes: 03671
- Vehicle registration: SLF

Kamsdorf is a village and a former municipality in the district Saalfeld-Rudolstadt, in Thuringia, Germany. Since July 2018, it is part of the municipality Unterwellenborn.

== History ==
Within the German Empire (1871–1918), Kamsdorf was part of the Prussian Province of Saxony.
