= Komopolis =

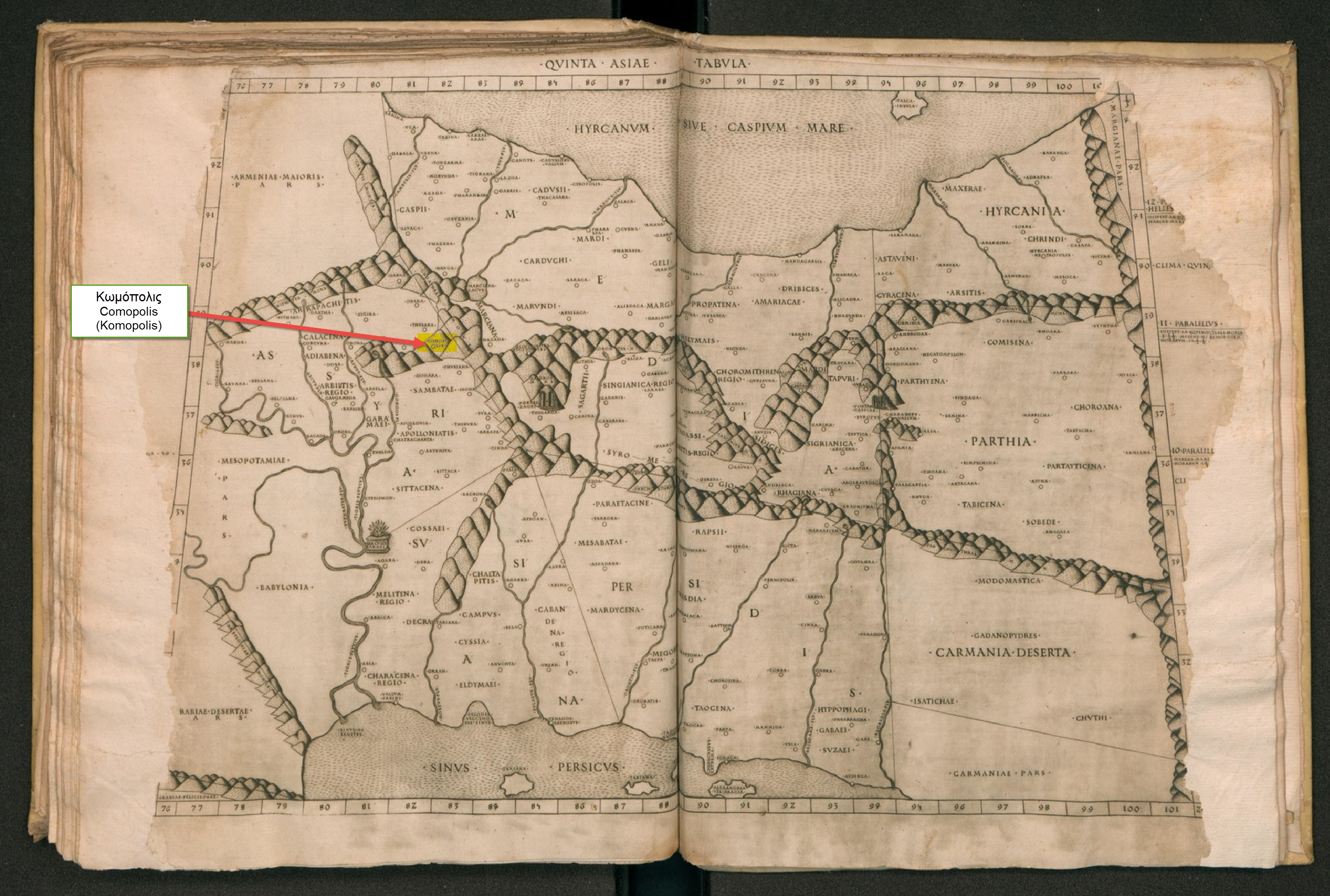
The fifth map of Asia of Ptolemy (Arnold Buckinck's version 1478), the location of Komopolis is noted

Komopolis was a settlement in Assyria, which is mentioned by Ptolemy, 2nd century geographer, at his work Geography.

Ptolemy refers to it at the chapter of Assyria, not with the settlements in the part of Tigris, but at the part of "the rest of the country, middle" (εν δε τη λοιπή χώρα μέση) between the following cities (from a total of 34 cities of Assyria), as shown below:

- Oroba
- Degia
- Komopolis
- Dosa
- Gaugamela

Hoefer reports that those 34 cities existed during the period of the life of Ptolemy, the Assyria of the Seleucides and of the Arsacides, as he does not mention ancient cities which were in ruins since long.

Barrington Atlas mentions that the city (less confidently) belongs to the Hellenistic and Roman period (330 BC - 30 BC), or confidently to the early Roman Empire (30 BC-AD 300).

In his text for the names of cities during the Seleucid Empire, William Woodthorpe Tarn (1996) believes that several cities were referred to with nicknames and not with their official names, and in some cases, (including Komopolis among them) "descriptions of places as though they were names", a note mentioned also by Getzel M. Cohen (2006)
