= Elmar Faber =

German book publisher (1934–2017)

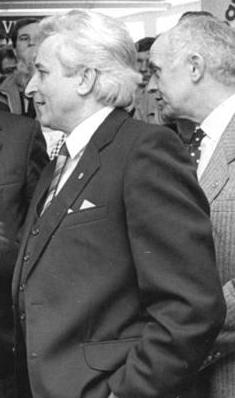
Faber in Leipzig, March 1987

Elmar Faber (1 April 1934 – 3 December 2017) was a German book publisher.

== Biography ==
Faber was born in Deesbach, Thuringia. He studied German studies at Leipzig University from 1954 to 1959, before becoming a lecturer at the Bibliographisches Institut, and he also worked as a publishing assistant at the latter. He served as head of the now defunct publisher Edition Leipzig from 1975 to 1983. He was later head of Aufbau-Verlag from 1983 to 1992, at a time when it was one of the largest publishing house in East Germany. In 1990, he co-founded the originally Berlin-based publisher Faber & Faber with his son Michael Faber. It was relocated to Leipzig in 1995. He was awarded the Order of Merit of the Federal Republic of Germany in 2007.

Faber's autobiography, Verloren im Paradies. Ein Verlegerleben, was published in 2014.

Faber died on 3 December 2017 in Leipzig, at the age of 83.
