= Dröbischau =

- Stadtteil of Königsee
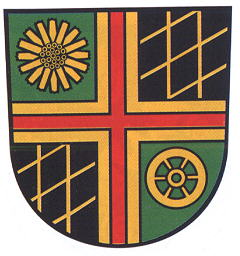
- Coat of arms
- Interactive map of Dröbischau
- Location within Germany Location within Thuringia
- Coordinates: 50°37′48″N 11°04′25″E
- Country: Germany
- State: Thuringia
- District: Saalfeld-Rudolstadt
- Town: Königsee
- Subdivisions: 2

Area
  - Total: 4.64 km^{2} (1.79 sq mi)
- Elevation: 593 m (1,946 ft)

Population (2017-12-31)
  - Total: 409
  - Density: 88.1/km^{2} (228/sq mi)
- Time zone: UTC+01:00 (CET)
  - Summer (DST): UTC+02:00 (CEST)
- Postal codes: 07426
- Dialling codes: 036738

Dröbischau (German pronunciation: [ˈdʁøːbɪʃaʊ]) is a village and a former municipality in the district Saalfeld-Rudolstadt, in Thuringia, Germany. Since 1 January 2019, it is part of the town Königsee.
