= Oberhain =

- Stadtteil of Königsee
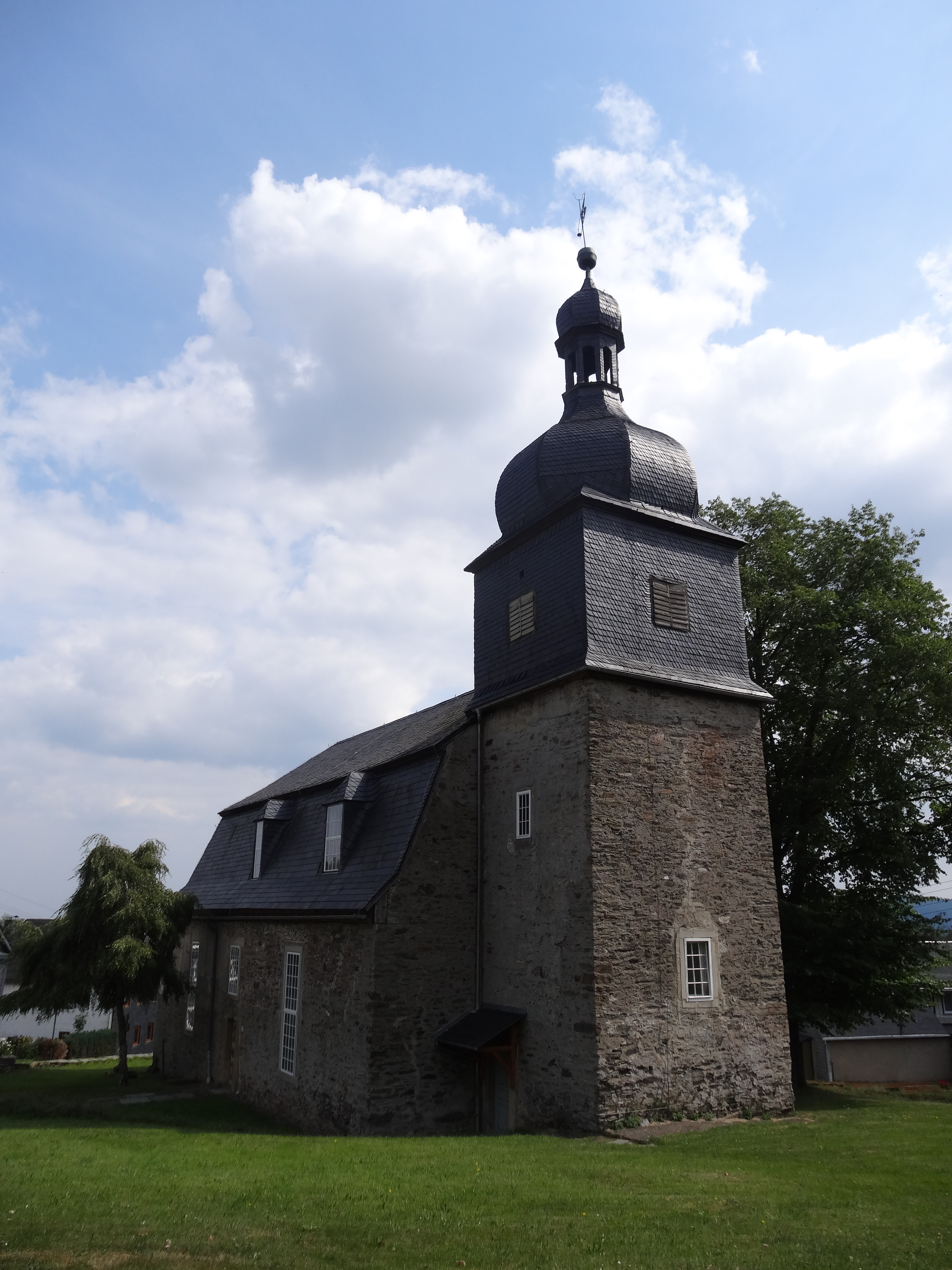
- Church of Saint Luke
- Interactive map of Oberhain
- Location within Germany Location within Thuringia
- Coordinates: 50°38′N 11°8′E
- Country: Germany
- State: Thuringia
- District: Saalfeld-Rudolstadt
- Town: Königsee
- Subdivisions: 4

Area
  - Total: 14.08 km^{2} (5.44 sq mi)
- Elevation: 570 m (1,870 ft)

Population (2017-12-31)
  - Total: 652
  - Density: 46.3/km^{2} (120/sq mi)
- Time zone: UTC+01:00 (CET)
  - Summer (DST): UTC+02:00 (CEST)
- Postal codes: 07426
- Dialling codes: 036738

Oberhain (German pronunciation: [ˈoːbɐhaɪn]) is a village and a former municipality in the district Saalfeld-Rudolstadt, in Thuringia, Germany. Since 1 January 2019, it has been part of the town Königsee.
