= Unterwellenborn =

- Municipality
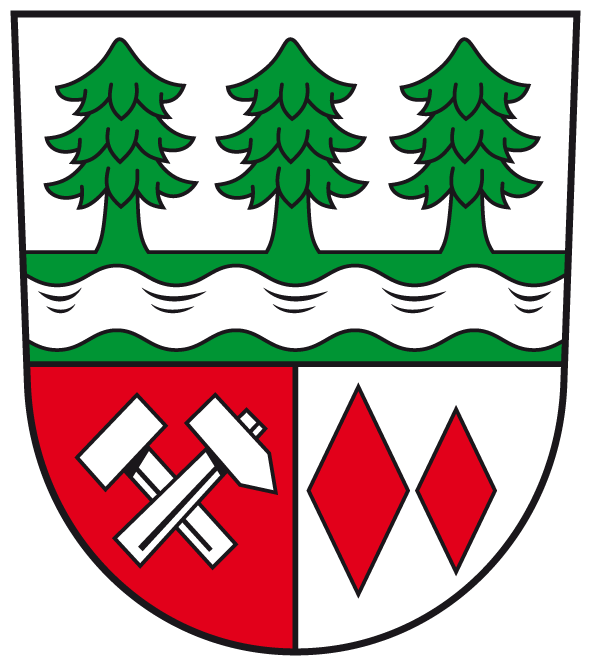
- Coat of arms

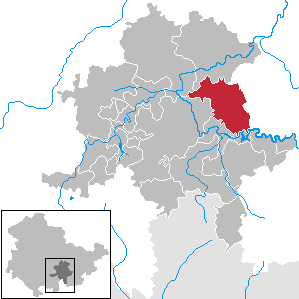
- Location of Unterwellenborn within Saalfeld-Rudolstadt district
- Interactive map of Unterwellenborn
- Location within Germany Location within Thuringia
- Coordinates: 50°39′31″N 11°26′31″E
- Country: Germany
- State: Thuringia
- District: Saalfeld-Rudolstadt

Government
  - Mayor (2024–30): André Gölitzer

Area
  - Total: 63.06 km^{2} (24.35 sq mi)
- Elevation: 265 m (869 ft)

Population (2025-12-31)
  - Total: 8,261
  - Density: 131.0/km^{2} (339.3/sq mi)
- Time zone: UTC+01:00 (CET)
  - Summer (DST): UTC+02:00 (CEST)
- Postal codes: 07333, 07334, 07336, 07387
- Dialling codes: 03647, 03671, 036732
- Vehicle registration: SLF
- Website: www.unterwellenborn.de

Unterwellenborn is a municipality in the district Saalfeld-Rudolstadt, in Thuringia, Germany. It was created on 1 February 2006 by fusion of the municipalities Birkigt, Goßwitz, Könitz, Lausnitz bei Pößneck and Unterwellenborn itself which had cooperated earlier as Verwaltungsgemeinschaft Unterwellenborn. Already on 9 April 1994, the municipalities Dorfkulm, Langenschade and Oberwellenborn had become part of the municipality of Unterwellenborn. In July 2018 the former municipality of Kamsdorf was merged into Unterwellenborn.
