= Ferdinand Hoefer =

German-French physician and lexicographer

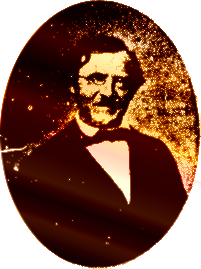
Ferdinand Hoefer

Jean Chrétien Ferdinand Hoefer (German: Ferdinand Höfer, 21 April 1811, Döschnitz – 4 May 1878) was a German-French medical doctor and lexicographer. He is now known for his many works on the history of science.

== Selected works ==
- Éléments de chimie générale (1841)
- Histoire de la chimie: Volume 1, Volume 2 (1842–43)
- Dictionnaire de chimie et de physique (1846)
- Dictionnaire de médecine pratique (1847)
- Afrique australe ... Afrique orientale ... Afrique centrale ... Empire de Maroc (Paris, Firmin Didot frères, 1848)
- Dictionnaire de botanique (1850)
- Le Maroc et la Chaldée (1848)
- Chaldée, Assyrie, Médie, Babylonie, Mésopotamie, Phénicie, Palmyrène (Firmin Didot frères, 1852).
- Bibliothèque historique de Diodore de Sicile (L. Hachette, 1865). Work by Diodorus Siculus, trans. Hoefer.
- Chimie einsegnée par la biographie de ses fondateurs (in French). Paris: Hachette et C.ie. 1865.
- Le monde des bois (1867)
- Les saisons (1867-1869)
- L'homme devant ses œuvres (1872)
- Histoire de la physique et de la chimie (Paris: Hachette, 1872)
- Histoire de l'astronomie (Paris: Hachette, 1873)
- Histoire de la zoologie (1873)
- Histoire des mathématiques (1874)
- Histoire de la botanique, de la minéralogie et de la géologie (Paris, Hachette et cie, 1882).

He also compiled the 46-volume "Nouvelle Biographie Générale, depuis les temps les plus reculés jusqu'à nos jours" (New General Biography, from earliest times to the present day), from 1853 to 1866.
