= Rudolph Beyer =

American politician

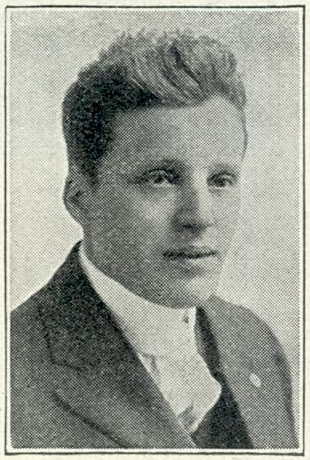
Beyer c. 1919

Rudolph Beyer (October 30, 1889 – February 23, 1970) was an American bookkeeper, chemical and surgical glassblower and Socialist politician from Milwaukee, Wisconsin.

He was born in Oberweißbach, Germany, but came to Milwaukee with his parents at the age of 2. He attended the Milwaukee public schools, including two years at North Division High School. After leaving school he worked as a bookkeeper for 3 years and then entered his father's business as a glassblower. He was elected to the Wisconsin State Senate representing the Milwaukee-based 5th Senate district, in 1918, receiving 6,374 votes to 6,237 for Charles B. Perry (Republican) and 3,371 for Joseph Phillips (Democratic). He served one term (1919–1922), and was the Socialist candidate for Lieutenant Governor of Wisconsin in 1950, coming in third.

He died in Milwaukee on February 23, 1970.
