= Hohenwarte =

- Municipality
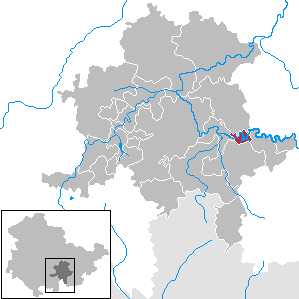
- Location of Hohenwarte within Saalfeld-Rudolstadt district
- Interactive map of Hohenwarte
- Location within Germany Location within Thuringia
- Coordinates: 50°36′N 11°29′E
- Country: Germany
- State: Thuringia
- District: Saalfeld-Rudolstadt

Government
  - Mayor (2022–28): Manfred Drieling

Area
  - Total: 6.31 km^{2} (2.44 sq mi)
- Elevation: 253 m (830 ft)

Population (2025-12-31)
  - Total: 158
  - Density: 25.0/km^{2} (64.9/sq mi)
- Time zone: UTC+01:00 (CET)
  - Summer (DST): UTC+02:00 (CEST)
- Postal codes: 07338
- Dialling codes: 036733
- Vehicle registration: SLF

Hohenwarte (German pronunciation: [ˈhoːənˌvaʁtə]) is a municipality in the district Saalfeld-Rudolstadt, in Thuringia, Germany.

== Geography ==
The municipality is situated in Naturpark Thüringer Schiefergebirge-Obere Saale on the Hohenwarte-Stausee.

== History ==
Honewarte was first mentioned in 1361. The place belonged to the county of Schwarzburg-Menschenberg, and after its dissolution from 1564 to 1918 to the Schwarzburg-Rudolstädter sovereignty of the county (principality) of Schwarzburg-Rudolstadt.

The operation of mills has shaped the small town on the Saale for centuries. The Rudolstadt company Grosch & Zitkow built a cartonboard factory in Hohenwarte in 1904. The population increased rapidly due to the influx of many workers. The construction of the Hohenwarte dam fundamentally changed the townscape. The Hohenwarte church was rebuilt in 1934–38 as a replacement for the lost church of Presswitz. For the workers at the Hohenwarte pumped-storage hydroelectricity power plant new residential buildings were built. In the 1960s the town had over 300 inhabitants. Since the Die Wende, the town has been particularly affected by demographic change; the population more than halved. In recent years, the population increased from 140 to 180.

From 1993 to 1995 the municipality belonged to the municipal association of Saale-Loquitz . With the dissolution of this on October 19, 1995, Kaulsdorf took over administrative duties for Hohenwarte.
