= Königsee =

- Town
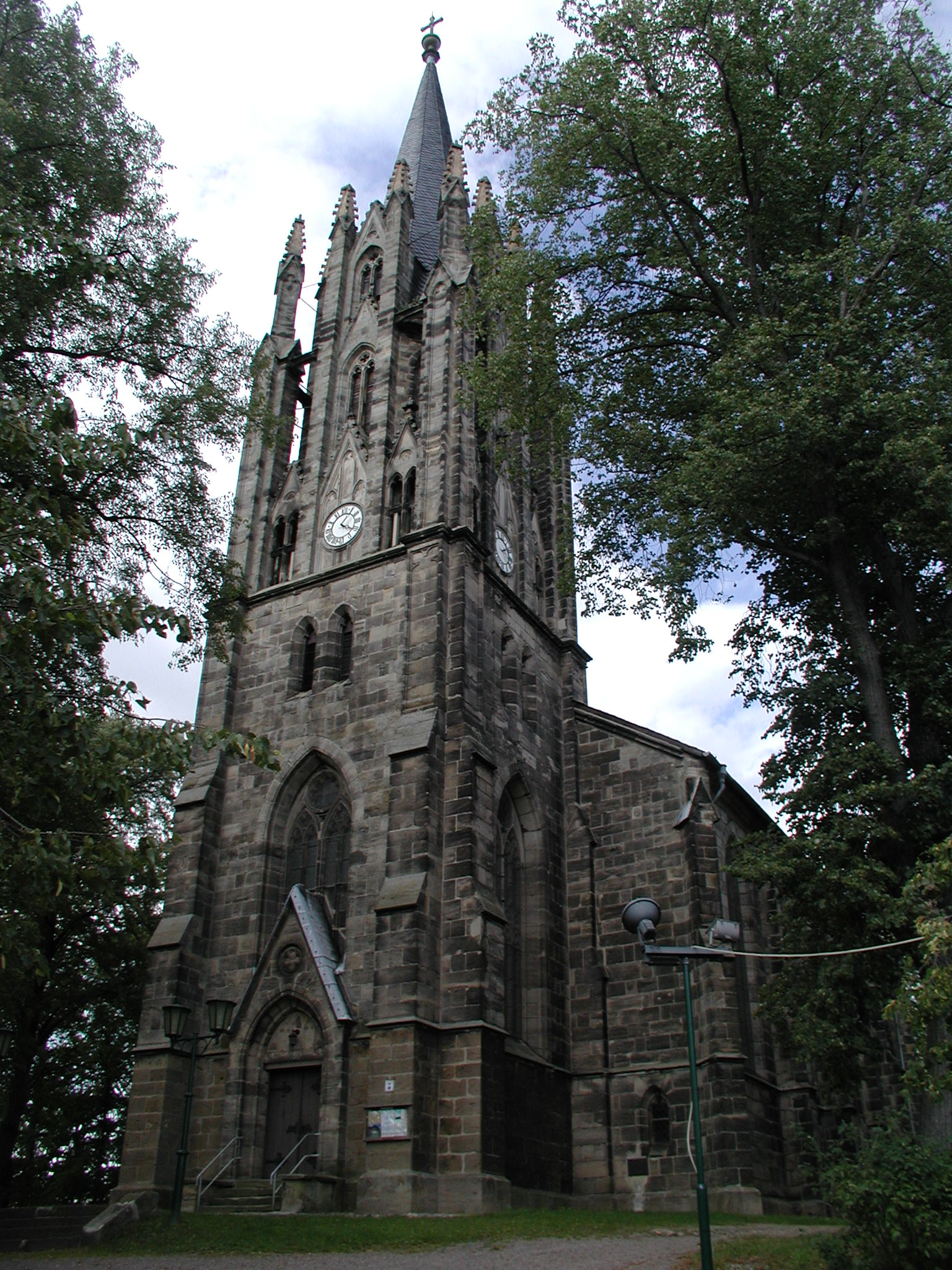

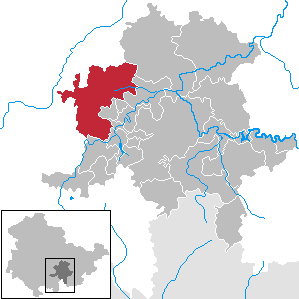
- Location of Königsee within Saalfeld-Rudolstadt district
- Interactive map of Königsee
- Location within Germany Location within Thuringia
- Coordinates: 50°39′41″N 11°5′50″E
- Country: Germany
- State: Thuringia
- District: Saalfeld-Rudolstadt
- Subdivisions: 23

Government
  - Mayor (2019–25): Marco Waschkowski

Area
  - Total: 103.09 km^{2} (39.80 sq mi)
- Elevation: 377 m (1,237 ft)

Population (2025-12-31)
  - Total: 6,979
  - Density: 67.70/km^{2} (175.3/sq mi)
- Time zone: UTC+01:00 (CET)
  - Summer (DST): UTC+02:00 (CEST)
- Postal codes: 07426
- Dialling codes: 036739, 036738
- Vehicle registration: SLF
- Website: cms.königsee-rottenbach.de

Königsee (German pronunciation: [ˈkøːnɪçˌzeː]) is a town and a municipality in the district of Saalfeld-Rudolstadt, in Thuringia, Germany. It is situated 12 kilometres (7.5 mi) east of Ilmenau, and 35 kilometres (22 mi) south of Erfurt. The present municipality was formed on 31 December 2012 by the merger of the former municipalities Königsee and Rottenbach, under the name Königsee-Rottenbach. On 1 January 2019 the former municipalities Dröbischau and Oberhain were absorbed, and the name was changed to Königsee.

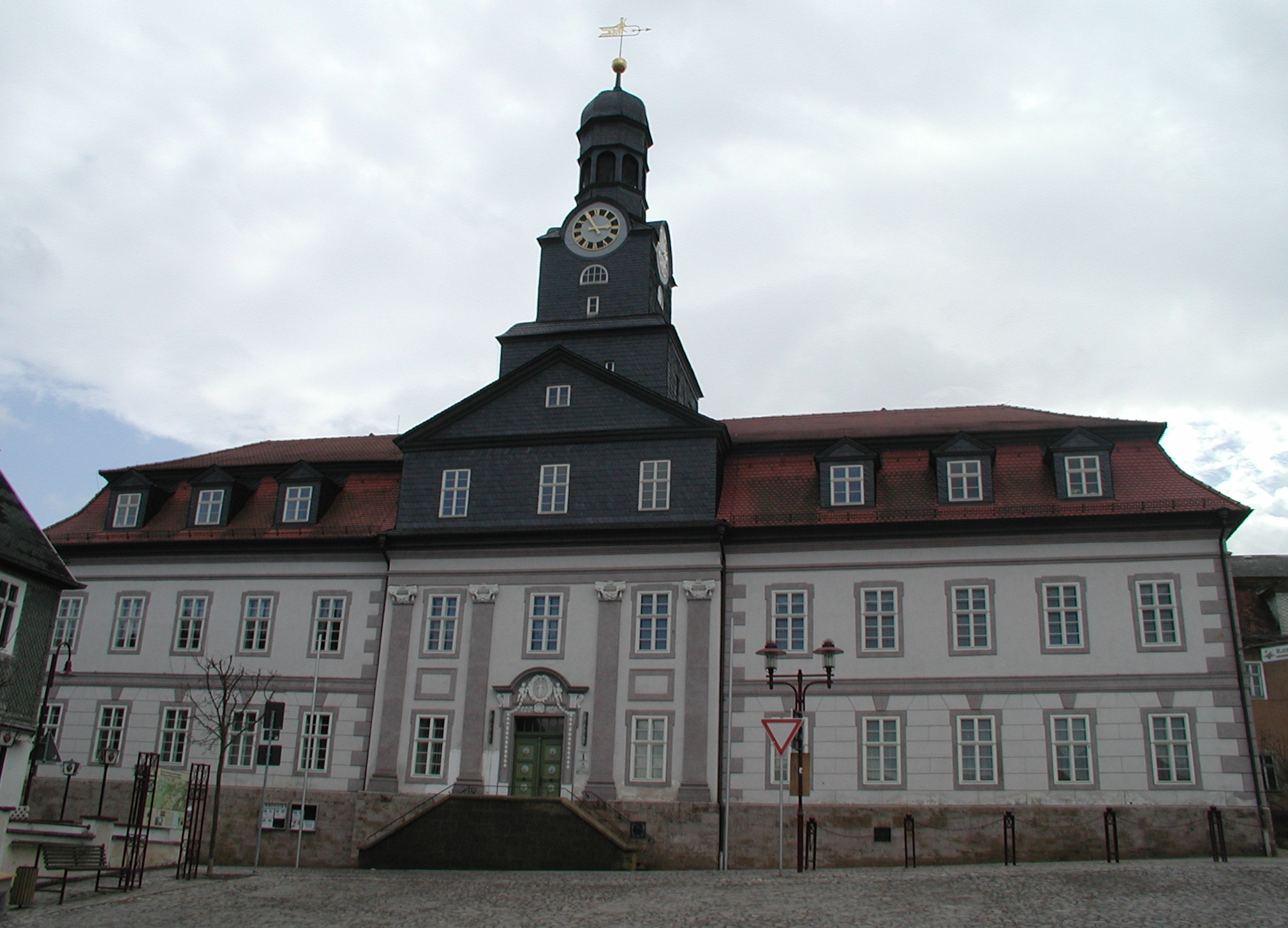
Town hall
