= Arnsgereuth =

- Stadtteil of Saalfeld
- Interactive map of Arnsgereuth
- Location within Germany Location within Thuringia
- Coordinates: 50°37′N 11°19′E
- Country: Germany
- State: Thuringia
- District: Saalfeld-Rudolstadt
- Town: Saalfeld

Area
  - Total: 4.03 km^{2} (1.56 sq mi)
- Elevation: 590 m (1,940 ft)

Population (2010-12-31)
  - Total: 253
  - Density: 62.8/km^{2} (163/sq mi)
- Time zone: UTC+01:00 (CET)
  - Summer (DST): UTC+02:00 (CEST)
- Postal codes: 07318
- Dialling codes: 036736

Arnsgereuth is a village and a former municipality in the district Saalfeld-Rudolstadt, in Thuringia, Germany. Since 1 December 2011, it is part of the town Saalfeld.

== People ==
- Carola Stauche (born 1952), German politician
