= Nouvelle Biographie Générale =

French biographical reference by Ferdinand Hoefer

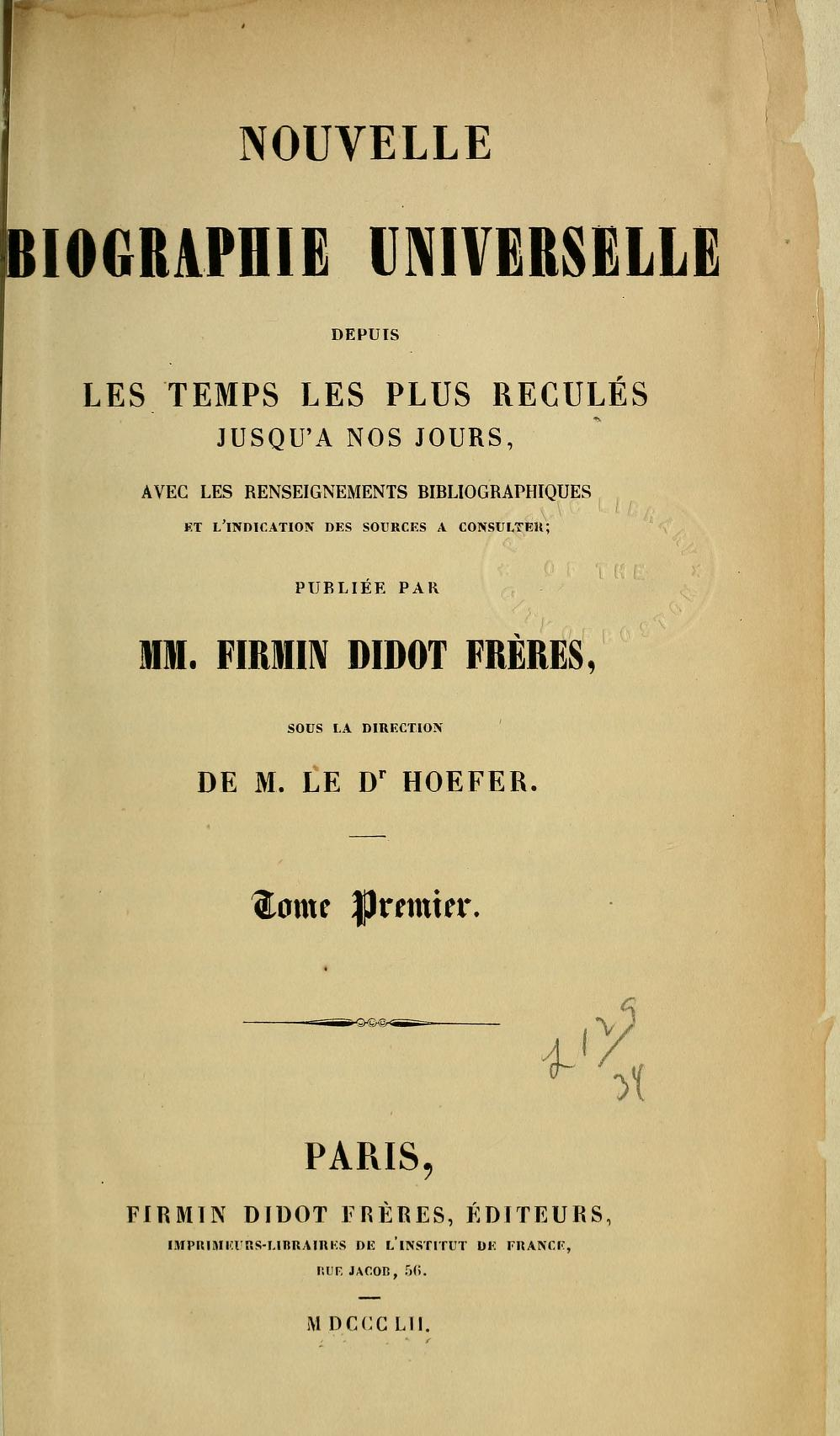
Title page of volume 1, 1852

The Nouvelle Biographie Générale ("New General Biography") was a 46-volume, French-language, biographical reference work, compiled between 1852 and 1866 by Ferdinand Hoefer, French physician and lexicographer.

The first nine volumes were entitled Nouvelle Biographie Universelle ("New Universal Biography").

== Notes ==
Nouvelle Biographie Générale
Volume	From	To
Volume 1	AA	Alfez
Volume 2	Alfieri	Aragona
Volume 3	Aragonèse	Azzubeydi
Volume 4	Baaden-Durlach	Beaumanoir
Volume 5	Beaumarchais	Biccius
Volume 6	Bichat	Boulduc
Volume 7	Boulen	Bzovius
Volume 8	Cabacius	Caselles
Volume 9	Casenave	Charost
Volume 10	Charpentier	Cochran
Volume 11	Cochrane	Cortès
Volume 12	Cortèse	Danrémont
Volume 13	Dans	Dewlet
Volume 14	Dexbach	Duchesnois
Volume 15	Duchy	Emmery de Sept-Fontaines
Volume 16	Emmet	Faes
Volume 17	Faesch	Floris
Volume 18	Florus	Fryxell
Volume 19	Fuad-Effendi	Geoffrin
Volume 20	Geoffrin	Goerres
Volume 21	Goertz	Grevile
Volume 22	Grévin	Gyulay
Volume 23	Haag	Hennequin
Volume 24	Hennert	Holophira
Volume 25	Holst	Irwin
Volume 26	Isaac	Joséphine
Volume 27	Josépin	Koegler
Volume 28	Koehler	La laure
Volume 29	La Liborlière	Lavoisien
Volume 30	Lavoisier	Lettsom
Volume 31	Leu.	Louis-Napoléon
Volume 32	Louise se Savoie	Maldeghem
Volume 33	Maldonado	Martial
Volume 34	Martialis Gargilius	Mérard de Sainte-Juste
Volume 35	Mérat	Monnier
Volume 36	Monniotte	Murr
Volume 37	Murray	Nicolini
Volume 38	Nicolle	Ozerof
Volume 39	Paaw	Philopémen
Volume 40	Philoponus	Preval
Volume 41	Prévalaye	Renouard
Volume 42	Renoult	Saint-André
Volume 43	Saint-Ange	Simiane
Volume 44	Simler	Testa
Volume 45	Teste	Vermond
Volume 46	Verne (La)	Zyll.
