= Schwarzatal (Verwaltungsgemeinschaft) =

Municipality in Thuringia, Germany

- Verwaltungsgemeinschaft
- Map of Saalfeld-Rudolstadt highlighting Schwarzatal
- Interactive map of Schwarzatal
- Location within Germany Location within Thuringia
- Coordinates: 50°35′N 11°09′E
- Country: Germany
- State: Thuringia
- District: Saalfeld-Rudolstadt
- Seat: Schwarzatal
- Subdivisions: 10 municipalities

Area
  - Total: 128.21 km^{2} (49.50 sq mi)

Population (2025-12-31)
  - Total: 8,112
  - Density: 63.27/km^{2} (163.9/sq mi)
- Time zone: UTC+01:00 (CET)
  - Summer (DST): UTC+02:00 (CEST)
- Website: vg-schwarzatal.de

Schwarzatal is a Verwaltungsgemeinschaft ("municipal association") in the district Saalfeld-Rudolstadt, in Thuringia, Germany. The seat of the Verwaltungsgemeinschaft is in Schwarzatal. It was created on 1 January 2019.

The Verwaltungsgemeinschaft Schwarzatal consists of the following municipalities:

1. Cursdorf
2. Deesbach
3. Döschnitz
4. Katzhütte
5. Meura
6. Rohrbach
7. Schwarzatal
8. Schwarzburg
9. Sitzendorf
10. Unterweißbach
