= Unterweißbach =

- Municipality
- Coat of arms

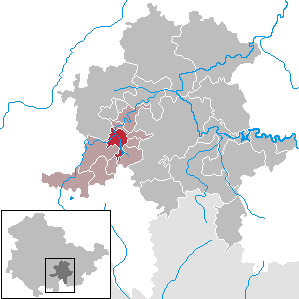
- Location of Unterweißbach within Saalfeld-Rudolstadt district
- Interactive map of Unterweißbach
- Location within Germany Location within Thuringia
- Coordinates: 50°37′N 11°11′E
- Country: Germany
- State: Thuringia
- District: Saalfeld-Rudolstadt
- Municipal assoc.: Schwarzatal
- Subdivisions: 3

Government
  - Mayor (2022–28): Steffen Günther

Area
  - Total: 13.14 km^{2} (5.07 sq mi)
- Elevation: 330 m (1,080 ft)

Population (2025-12-31)
  - Total: 707
  - Density: 53.8/km^{2} (139/sq mi)
- Time zone: UTC+01:00 (CET)
  - Summer (DST): UTC+02:00 (CEST)
- Postal codes: 98744
- Dialling codes: 036730
- Vehicle registration: SLF
- Website: www.unterweissbach.de

Unterweißbach is a municipality in the district Saalfeld-Rudolstadt, in Thuringia, Germany.
