= Bechstedt =

- Municipality
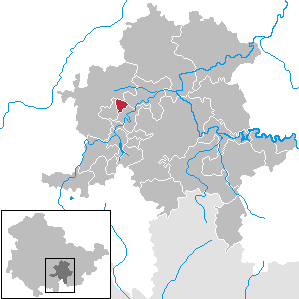
- Location of Bechstedt within Saalfeld-Rudolstadt district
- Interactive map of Bechstedt
- Location within Germany Location within Thuringia
- Coordinates: 50°40′N 11°10′E
- Country: Germany
- State: Thuringia
- District: Saalfeld-Rudolstadt

Government
  - Mayor (2022–28): Kati Zawierucha

Area
  - Total: 3.46 km^{2} (1.34 sq mi)
- Elevation: 375 m (1,230 ft)

Population (2025-12-31)
  - Total: 143
  - Density: 41.3/km^{2} (107/sq mi)
- Time zone: UTC+01:00 (CET)
  - Summer (DST): UTC+02:00 (CEST)
- Postal codes: 07426
- Dialling codes: 036730
- Vehicle registration: SLF

Bechstedt is a municipality in the district Saalfeld-Rudolstadt, in Thuringia, Germany.
