= Meura =

- Municipality
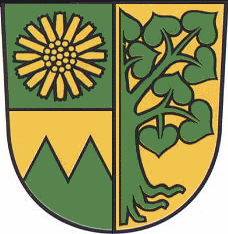
- Coat of arms

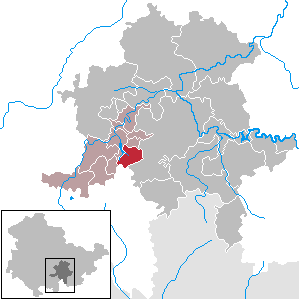
- Location of Meura within Saalfeld-Rudolstadt district
- Interactive map of Meura
- Location within Germany Location within Thuringia
- Coordinates: 50°34′N 11°11′E
- Country: Germany
- State: Thuringia
- District: Saalfeld-Rudolstadt
- Municipal assoc.: Schwarzatal

Government
  - Mayor (2021–27): Katrin Amberg

Area
  - Total: 12.61 km^{2} (4.87 sq mi)
- Elevation: 500–700 m (1,600–2,300 ft)

Population (2025-12-31)
  - Total: 375
  - Density: 29.7/km^{2} (77.0/sq mi)
- Time zone: UTC+01:00 (CET)
  - Summer (DST): UTC+02:00 (CEST)
- Postal codes: 98744
- Dialling codes: 036701
- Vehicle registration: SLF
- Website: www.meura.de

Meura is a municipality in the district Saalfeld-Rudolstadt, in Thuringia, Germany.

It is the location of Europe's largest stud farm for Haflinger horses.
