= Sitzendorf =

- Municipality
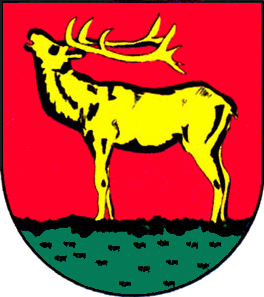
- Coat of arms

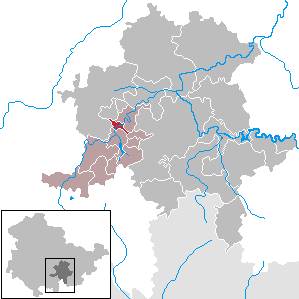
- Location of Sitzendorf within Saalfeld-Rudolstadt district
- Interactive map of Sitzendorf
- Location within Germany Location within Thuringia
- Coordinates: 50°38′N 11°10′E
- Country: Germany
- State: Thuringia
- District: Saalfeld-Rudolstadt
- Municipal assoc.: Schwarzatal

Government
  - Mayor (2022–28): Martin Friedrich

Area
  - Total: 2.52 km^{2} (0.97 sq mi)
- Elevation: 305 m (1,001 ft)

Population (2025-12-31)
  - Total: 720
  - Density: 290/km^{2} (740/sq mi)
- Time zone: UTC+01:00 (CET)
  - Summer (DST): UTC+02:00 (CEST)
- Postal codes: 07429
- Dialling codes: 036730
- Vehicle registration: SLF
- Website: www.sitzendorf-schwarzatal.de

Sitzendorf is a municipality in the district Saalfeld-Rudolstadt, in Thuringia, Germany.
