= Rohrbach, Saalfeld-Rudolstadt =

Rohrbach
- Municipality
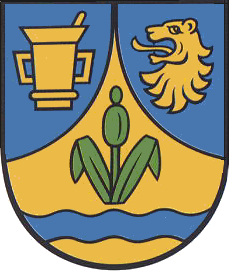
- Coat of arms

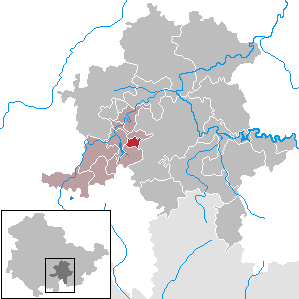
- Location of Rohrbach within Saalfeld-Rudolstadt district
- Interactive map of Rohrbach
- Location within Germany Location within Thuringia
- Coordinates: 50°36′N 11°13′E
- Country: Germany
- State: Thuringia
- District: Saalfeld-Rudolstadt
- Municipal assoc.: Schwarzatal

Government
  - Mayor (2022–28): Carmen Schachtzabel

Area
  - Total: 3.89 km^{2} (1.50 sq mi)
- Elevation: 405 m (1,329 ft)

Population (2025-12-31)
  - Total: 178
  - Density: 45.8/km^{2} (119/sq mi)
- Time zone: UTC+01:00 (CET)
  - Summer (DST): UTC+02:00 (CEST)
- Postal codes: 07429
- Dialling codes: 036730
- Vehicle registration: SLF
- Website: www.rohrbach-schwarzatal.de

Rohrbach (German pronunciation: [ˈʁoːɐ̯bax]) is a municipality in the district Saalfeld-Rudolstadt, in Thuringia, Germany.
