= Allendorf, Thuringia =

Allendorf
- Municipality
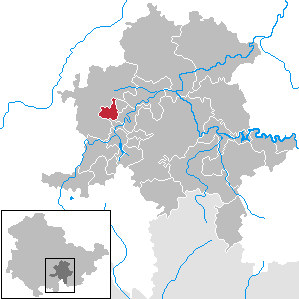
- Location of Allendorf within Saalfeld-Rudolstadt district
- Interactive map of Allendorf
- Location within Germany Location within Thuringia
- Coordinates: 50°39′N 11°10′E
- Country: Germany
- State: Thuringia
- District: Saalfeld-Rudolstadt
- Subdivisions: 2

Government
  - Mayor (2019–25): Christian Bechmann

Area
  - Total: 8.78 km^{2} (3.39 sq mi)
- Elevation: 350 m (1,150 ft)

Population (2025-12-31)
  - Total: 334
  - Density: 38.0/km^{2} (98.5/sq mi)
- Time zone: UTC+01:00 (CET)
  - Summer (DST): UTC+02:00 (CEST)
- Postal codes: 07426
- Dialling codes: 036730
- Vehicle registration: SLF

Allendorf (German: [ˈaləndɔʁf]) is a municipality in the district Saalfeld-Rudolstadt, in Thuringia, Germany.
