= Deesbach =

- Municipality
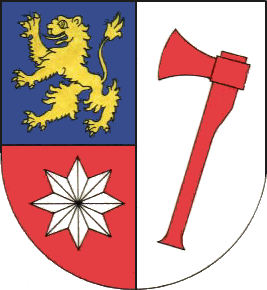
- Coat of arms

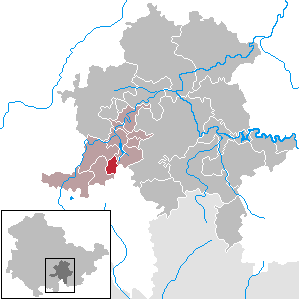
- Location of Deesbach within Saalfeld-Rudolstadt district
- Interactive map of Deesbach
- Location within Germany Location within Thuringia
- Coordinates: 50°34′N 11°9′E
- Country: Germany
- State: Thuringia
- District: Saalfeld-Rudolstadt
- Municipal assoc.: Schwarzatal

Government
  - Mayor (2022–28): Claudia Böhm

Area
  - Total: 6.12 km^{2} (2.36 sq mi)
- Elevation: 651 m (2,136 ft)

Population (2025-12-31)
  - Total: 324
  - Density: 52.9/km^{2} (137/sq mi)
- Time zone: UTC+01:00 (CET)
  - Summer (DST): UTC+02:00 (CEST)
- Postal codes: 98744
- Dialling codes: 036705
- Vehicle registration: SLF
- Website: www.deesbach-thueringen.de

Deesbach is a municipality in the district Saalfeld-Rudolstadt, in Thuringia, Germany.

== People from Deesbach ==
- Elmar Faber (1934–2017)
