= Schwarzburg (municipality) =

Municipality in Saalfeld-Rudolstadt district, Thuringia, Germany

- Municipality
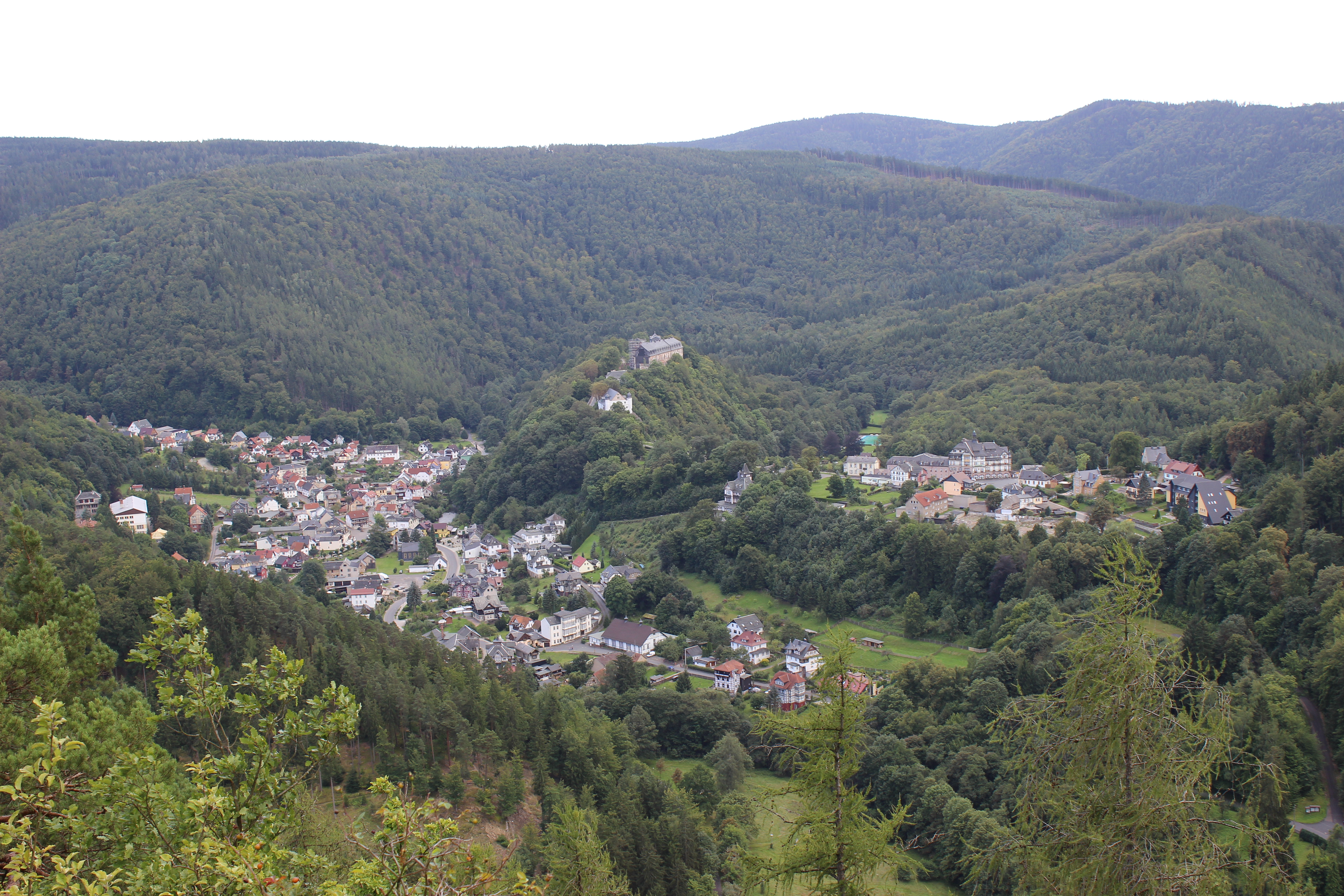
- Schwarzburg seen from Trippstein

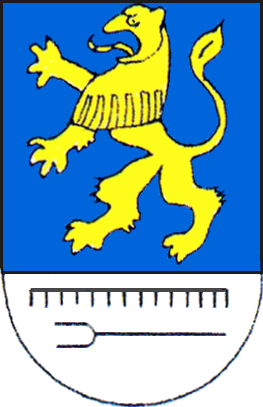
- Coat of arms

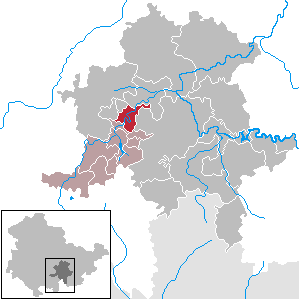
- Location of Schwarzburg within Saalfeld-Rudolstadt district
- Interactive map of Schwarzburg
- Location within Germany Location within Thuringia
- Coordinates: 50°38′27″N 11°11′49″E
- Country: Germany
- State: Thuringia
- District: Saalfeld-Rudolstadt
- Municipal assoc.: Schwarzatal

Government
  - Mayor (2021–27): Heike Printz

Area
  - Total: 14.63 km^{2} (5.65 sq mi)
- Elevation: 280 m (920 ft)

Population (2025-12-31)
  - Total: 515
  - Density: 35.2/km^{2} (91.2/sq mi)
- Time zone: UTC+01:00 (CET)
  - Summer (DST): UTC+02:00 (CEST)
- Postal codes: 07427
- Dialling codes: 036730
- Vehicle registration: SLF
- Website: www.mittleres-schwarzatal.de

Schwarzburg is a municipality in the valley of the Schwarza (German: Schwarzatal) in the district Saalfeld-Rudolstadt in Thuringia, in central Germany.

It was first mentioned in 1071 as Swartzinburg. The (now-ruined) castle was from the 12th century the seat of the Counts of Schwarzburg. Then Rudolstadt became seat of the new line of Schwarzburg-Rudolstadt.

On 11 August 1919, while on holiday in Schwarzburg, Friedrich Ebert, the first Reichspräsident of Germany, signed the Weimar constitution, the first democratic constitution of Germany.
