= Döschnitz =

- Municipality
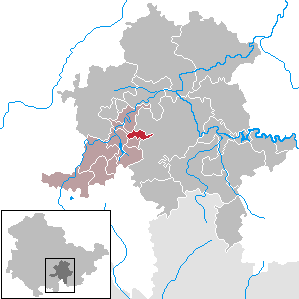
- Location of Döschnitz within Saalfeld-Rudolstadt district
- Interactive map of Döschnitz
- Location within Germany Location within Thuringia
- Coordinates: 50°37′N 11°13′E
- Country: Germany
- State: Thuringia
- District: Saalfeld-Rudolstadt
- Municipal assoc.: Schwarzatal

Government
  - Mayor (2022–28): Klaus Biehl

Area
  - Total: 6.28 km^{2} (2.42 sq mi)
- Elevation: 415 m (1,362 ft)

Population (2025-12-31)
  - Total: 214
  - Density: 34.1/km^{2} (88.3/sq mi)
- Time zone: UTC+01:00 (CET)
  - Summer (DST): UTC+02:00 (CEST)
- Postal codes: 07429
- Dialling codes: 036730
- Vehicle registration: SLF
- Website: www.doeschnitz.de

Döschnitz is a municipality in the district Saalfeld-Rudolstadt, in Thuringia, Germany.

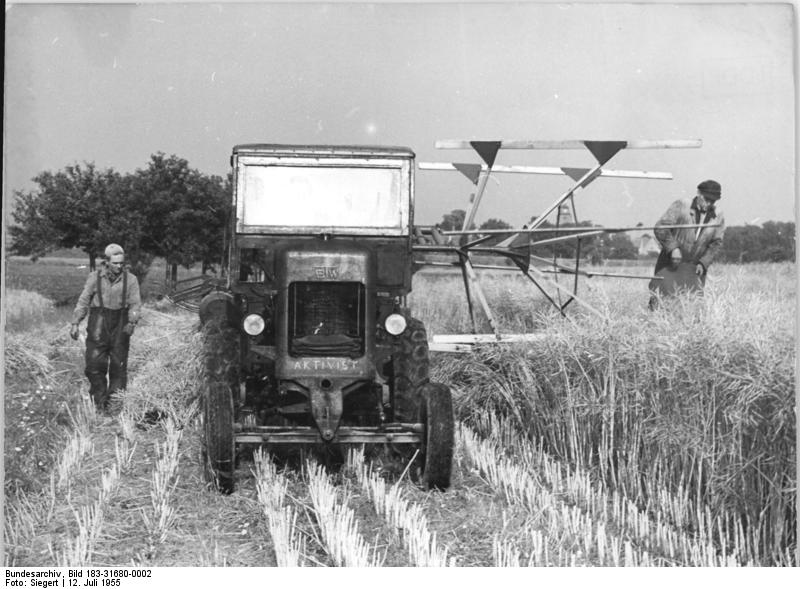
Agriculture in Döschnitz, 1955
