= Katzhütte =

- Municipality
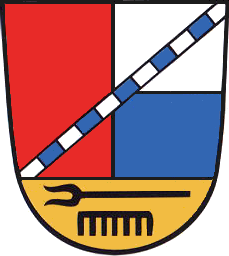
- Coat of arms

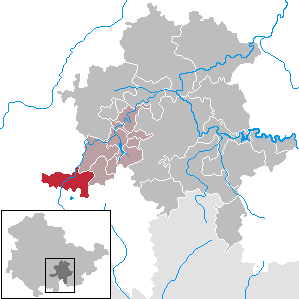
- Location of Katzhütte within Saalfeld-Rudolstadt district
- Interactive map of Katzhütte
- Location within Germany Location within Thuringia
- Coordinates: 50°33′8″N 11°3′12″E
- Country: Germany
- State: Thuringia
- District: Saalfeld-Rudolstadt
- Municipal assoc.: Schwarzatal
- Subdivisions: 2

Government
  - Mayor (2022–28): Ramona Geyer

Area
  - Total: 28.69 km^{2} (11.08 sq mi)
- Elevation: 420 m (1,380 ft)

Population (2025-12-31)
  - Total: 1,170
  - Density: 40.8/km^{2} (106/sq mi)
- Time zone: UTC+01:00 (CET)
  - Summer (DST): UTC+02:00 (CEST)
- Postal codes: 98746
- Dialling codes: 036781
- Vehicle registration: SLF
- Website: www.katzhuette-thueringen.de

Katzhütte is a municipality in the district Saalfeld-Rudolstadt, in Thuringia, Germany.

== Geography ==
The municipality Katzhütte is the centre of the upper Schwarza valley.

== History ==
The borders of the present day town were formed in 1950 by the consolidation of Katzhütte and Oelze into a single large municipality. At its founding there were about 3800 inhabitants, but following consolidation the number of inhabitants has dramatically decreased. By 2020 there were only 1,291 citizens remaining.

The town is well known as the home of the porcelain manufacturer Porzellanfabrik Hertwig & Co., founded by Christoph Hertwig and Benjamin Beyermann in 1864.
