= Cursdorf =

- Municipality
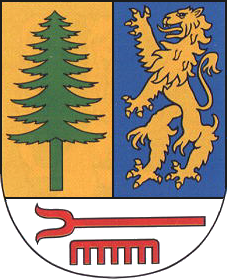
- Coat of arms

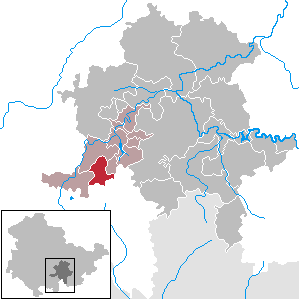
- Location of Cursdorf within Saalfeld-Rudolstadt district
- Interactive map of Cursdorf
- Location within Germany Location within Thuringia
- Coordinates: 50°34′N 11°8′E
- Country: Germany
- State: Thuringia
- District: Saalfeld-Rudolstadt
- Municipal assoc.: Schwarzatal

Government
  - Mayor (2022–28): Frank Eilhauer

Area
  - Total: 13.95 km^{2} (5.39 sq mi)
- Elevation: 690 m (2,260 ft)

Population (2025-12-31)
  - Total: 590
  - Density: 42/km^{2} (110/sq mi)
- Time zone: UTC+01:00 (CET)
  - Summer (DST): UTC+02:00 (CEST)
- Postal codes: 98744
- Dialling codes: 036705
- Vehicle registration: SLF
- Website: www.cursdorf.com

Cursdorf is a municipality in the district Saalfeld-Rudolstadt, in Thuringia, Germany.
