= Saalfeld-Rudolstadt =

Coordinates: 50°40′N 11°20′E

- District
- Flag Coat of arms
- Country: Germany
- State: Thuringia
- Capital: Saalfeld

Government
  - District admin.: Marko Wolfram (SPD)

Area
  - Total: 1,008.81 km^{2} (389.50 sq mi)

Population (31 December 2022)
  - Total: 101,494
  - Density: 100/km^{2} (260/sq mi)
- Time zone: UTC+01:00 (CET)
  - Summer (DST): UTC+02:00 (CEST)
- Vehicle registration: SLF, RU
- Website: www.kreis-slf.de

Saalfeld-Rudolstadt is a Kreis (district) in the south of Thuringia, Germany. Neighboring districts are (from the north clockwise) the districts Weimarer Land, Saale-Holzland, Saale-Orla, the district Kronach in Bavaria, and the districts Sonneberg, Hildburghausen and Ilm-Kreis.

== History ==
The district dates back to the Landratsamt Saalfeld, which was created in 1868, and in 1922 it was converted into the Landkreis. Also in 1922 the district Rudolstadt was created, the second historical root of the district as of today. Both districts were merged in the communal reform of 1994.

== Geography ==
The main river in the district is the Saale. The highest elevation is 827 m above sea level near Piesau, and the lowest, at 169 m, is in the Saale river valley near Niederkrossen.

== Coat of arms ==
As Saalfeld was the capital of the Duchy of Saxe-Coburg-Saalfeld, the Saxon coat of arms is displayed in the top-right and bottom-left quarter of the coat of arms. The other two quarters show the coat of arms of the Princes of Schwarzburg-Rudolstadt. The double-headed imperial eagle is the symbol for the title as imperial prince, the comb in bottom symbolizes the title of Imperial Stable Master held by the princes.

== Towns, municipalities and municipal associations ==
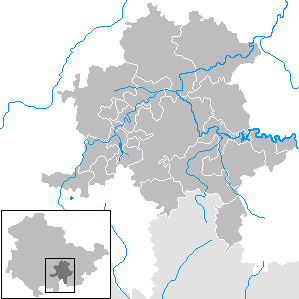
Clickable map of towns and municipalities in the district

Towns (of its own) and municipalities
1. Bad Blankenburg
2. Königsee
3. Leutenberg
4. Rudolstadt
5. Saalfeld
1. Allendorf
2. Altenbeuthen
3. Bechstedt
4. Drognitz
5. Hohenwarte
6. Kaulsdorf
7. Uhlstädt-Kirchhasel
8. Unterwellenborn

Municipal associations (de. Verwaltungsgemeinschaften)
1. Schiefergebirge; 1. Gräfenthal^{2}; 2. Lehesten^{2}; 3. Probstzella^{1}	2. Schwarzatal; 1. Cursdorf; 2. Deesbach; 3. Döschnitz; 4. Katzhütte; 5. Meura; 6. Rohrbach; 7. Schwarzatal^{1, 2}; 8. Schwarzburg; 9. Sitzendorf; 10. Unterweißbach
^{1}municipal association's residence^{2}town
