= List of consorts of Schwarzburg =

== Schwarzburg ==
=== Countess of Schwarzburg (Incomplete), 1197–1552 ===
Picture	Name	Father	Birth	Marriage	Became Countess	Ceased to be Countess	Death	Spouse
-	-	()	-	-		-	-	George William

== Schwarzburg-Sondershausen ==
=== Countess of Schwarzburg-Sondershausen, 1552–1697 ===
Picture	Name	Father	Birth	Marriage	Became Countess	Ceased to be Princess	Death	Spouse
	Anna of Oldenburg	Anthony I, Count of Oldenburg (Oldenburg)	3 April 1539	16 February 1566		25 August 1579		Johann Günther I
	Anna Sybilla of Schwarzburg-Rudolstadt	Albrecht VII, Count of Schwarzburg-Rudolstadt (Schwarzburg)	14 March 1584	15 November 1612		22 August 1623		Christian Günther I
	Maria Magdalena of the Palatinate-Zweibrücken-Birkenfeld	George William, Count Palatine of Zweibrücken-Birkenfeld (Wittelsbach)	8 August 1622	29 October 1644		19 August 1666 husband's death	27 October 1689	Anton Günther I
	Antonie Sybille of Barby-Mühlingen	Friderich I, Count of Barby-Mühlingen (Barby-Mühlingen)	7 April 1641	29 October 1644		2 May 1684		Christian William I
	Wilhelmine Christiane of Saxe-Weimar	Johann Ernst II, Duke of Saxe-Weimar (Saxe-Weimar)	26 January 1658	25 September 1684		3 September 1697; Raised to Princess	30 June 1712	Christian William I
	Augusta Dorothea of Brunswick-Wolfenbüttel	Anthony Ulrich, Duke of Brunswick-Wolfenbüttel (Welf)	16 December 1666	6 August 1684		3 September 1697; Raised to Princess	11 July 1751	Anton Günther II

=== Princess of Schwarzburg-Sondershausen, 1697–1918 ===
Picture	Name	Father	Birth	Marriage	Became Princess	Ceased to be Princess	Death	Spouse
	Wilhelmine Christiane of Saxe-Weimar	Johann Ernst II, Duke of Saxe-Weimar (Saxe-Weimar)	26 January 1658	25 September 1684	3 September 1697; Raised from Countess	30 June 1712		Christian William I
	Augusta Dorothea of Brunswick-Wolfenbüttel	Anthony Ulrich, Duke of Brunswick-Wolfenbüttel (Welf)	16 December 1666	6 August 1684	3 September 1697; Raised from Countess	20 July 1716 husband's death	11 July 1751	Anton Günther II
	Elisabeth Albertine of Anhalt-Bernburg	Karl Frederick, Prince of Anhalt-Bernburg (Ascania)	31 March 1693	2 October 1712	10 May 1721 husband's accession	28 November 1740 husband's death	7 July 1774	Günther XLIII
	Charlotte Wilhelmine of Anhalt-Bernburg	Victor Frederick, Prince of Anhalt-Bernburg (Ascania)	25 August 1737	4 February 1760		26 April 1777		Christian Günther III
	Marie of Schwarzburg-Rudolstadt	Prince Karl Günther of Schwarzburg-Rudolstadt (Schwarzburg)	21 January 1774	23 June 1799		19 August 1835 husband's abdication	11 January 1854	Günther Friedrich Karl I
	Mathilde of Hohenlohe-Öhringen	August, Prince of Hohenlohe-Öhringen (Hohenlohe-Öhringen)	3 July 1814	29 May 1834	19 August 1835 husband's accession	5 May 1852 divorce	3 June 1888	Günther Friedrich Karl II
	Marie Gasparine of Saxe-Altenburg	Prince Eduard of Saxe-Altenburg (Saxe-Altenburg)	28 June 1845	12 June 1869	15 September 1889 husband's accession	28 March 1909 husband's death	5 July 1930	Karl Günther I
	Anna Louise of Schönburg-Waldenburg	Georg, Prince of Schönburg-Waldenburg (Schönburg-Waldenburg)	19 February 1871	9 December 1891	28 March 1909 husband's death	22 November 1918 husband's abdication	7 November 1951	Günther Victor

== Schwarzburg-Rudolstadt ==
=== Countess of Schwarzburg-Rudolstadt, 1552–1711 ===
Picture	Name	Father	Birth	Marriage	Became Countess	Ceased to be Princess	Death	Spouse
	Juliane of Nassau-Dillenburg	William I, Count of Nassau-Siegen (Nassau-Dillenburg)	10 August 1546	14 June 1575	23 May 1583 husband's accession	31 August 1588		Albrecht VII
	Albertine Elisabeth of Leiningen-Westerburg	Reinhard II, Count of Leiningen-Westerburg (Leiningen)	1568	2 March 1591		10 April 1605 husband's death	1617	Albrecht VII
	Anna Sophie of Anhalt	Joachim Ernest, Prince of Anhalt (Ascania)	15 June 1584	13 June 1613		24 September 1630 husband's death	9 June 1652	Karl Günther
	Emilie of Oldenburg	Anthony II, Count of Delmenhorst (Oldenburg)	15 June 1614	4 February 1638		4 November 1646 husband's death	4 December 1670	Louis Günther I
	Æmilie Juliane of Barby-Mühlingen	Albrecht Friedrich I, Count of Barby-Mühlingen (Barby-Mühlingen)	19 August 1637	7 June 1665		3 December 1706		Albert Anton II
	Anna Sophie of Saxe-Gotha-Altenburg	Frederick I, Duke of Saxe-Gotha-Altenburg (Saxe-Gotha-Altenburg)	22 December 1670	15 October 1691	15 December 1710 husband's accession	1711 elevate to Princess	28 December 1728	Louis Frederick I

=== Princess of Schwarzburg-Rudolstadt, 1711–1918 ===
Picture	Name	Father	Birth	Marriage	Became Princess	Ceased to be Princess	Death	Spouse
	Anna Sophie of Saxe-Gotha-Altenburg	Frederick I, Duke of Saxe-Gotha-Altenburg (Saxe-Gotha-Altenburg)	22 December 1670	15 October 1691	1711 elevate from Countess	24 June 1718 husband's death	28 December 1728	Louis Frederick I
	Sophia Wilhelmina of Saxe-Coburg-Saalfeld	John Ernest IV, Duke of Saxe-Coburg-Saalfeld (Saxe-Coburg-Saalfeld)	9 August 1693	8 February 1720		4 December 1727		Frederick Anton
	Christina Sophie of East Frisia	Christian Eberhard, Prince of East Frisia (Cirksena)	16 March 1688	31 December 1729		1 September 1744 husband's death	31 March 1750	Frederick Anton
	Bernhardine of Saxe-Weimar-Eisenach	Ernest Augustus I, Duke of Saxe-Weimar-Eisenach (Saxe-Weimar-Eisenach)	5 May 1724	19 November 1744		5 June 1757		John Frederick I
	Sophie Henriette Reuss of Untergreiz	Heinrich XIII, Count Reuss of Untergreiz (Reuss)	19 September 1711	22 October 1733	10 July 1767 husband's accession	22 January 1771		Louis Günther II
	Auguste of Saxe-Gotha-Altenburg	Prince John August of Saxe-Gotha-Altenburg (Saxe-Gotha-Altenburg)	30 November 1752	28 November 1780	29 August 1790 husband's accession	13 April 1793 husband's death	28 May 1805	Frederick Charles
	Caroline of Hesse-Homburg	Frederick V, Landgrave of Hesse-Homburg (Hesse-Homburg)	26 August 1771	28 November 1780	13 April 1793 husband's accession	28 April 1807 husband's death	20 June 1854	Louis Frederick II
	Auguste of Anhalt-Dessau	Frederick, Hereditary Prince of Anhalt-Dessau (Ascania)	18 August 1793	15 April 1816		12 June 1854		Friedrich Günther
	Anna Louise of Schönburg-Waldenburg	George, Prince of Schönburg-Waldenburg (Schönburg-Waldenburg)	19 February 1871	9 December 1891		22 November 1918 husband's abdication	7 November 1951	Günther Victor
