= Henry Louis, Prince of Nassau-Saarbrücken =

Titular Prince of Nassau-Saarbrücken (1768–1797)

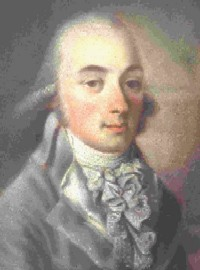
- Born: 9 March 1768; Saarbrücken
- Died: 27 April 1797 (aged 29); Cadolzburg
- Noble family: House of Nassau
- Spouse: Marie Francisca Maximilia of Montbarrey (m. 1785)
- Father: Louis, Prince of Nassau-Saarbrücken
- Mother: Princess Wilhelmina of Schwarzburg-Rudolstadt

Henry Louis Charles Albert, Prince of Nassau-Saarbrücken (9 March 1768 in Saarbrücken – 27 April 1797 near Cadolzburg), was a titular prince of Nassau-Saarbrücken. He never actually reigned, because the country was occupied by French revolutionary troops from 1793 until after his death.

== Life ==
He was the son of Louis, Prince of Nassau-Saarbrücken and his first wife, Princess Wilhelmina of Schwarzburg-Rudolstadt (1751–1780). His parents' marriage was unhappy, so that Wihelmine retreated to Hallberg Castle, where she raised her son.

He studied physics, first in Strasbourg and from 1782 to 1785 in Göttingen. Then he went on his Grand Tour. In 1786, he was in Berlin and in the spring of 1787 in Italy.

On 14 May 1793 he had to flee when French troop attacked Schloss Jägersberg in Neunkirchen. He entered Prussian military service. He had to watch when his ancestral castle went up in flames in October 1793. On 14 November 1793, he was promoted to colonel in the Prussian cavalry.

In 1794 his father died and he inherited the title of Prince. However, Nassau-Saarbrücken was still occupied by French revolutionary troops and he could not rule his principality.

In 1797 he died after a fall from a horse. Since he had no descendants, Nassau-Saarbrücken fell to his first cousin once removed, Prince Charles William of Nassau-Usingen (his father's first cousin). His half brother Adolph came of age in 1805 and resumed the title Prince of Nassau-Saarbrücken.

== Marriage ==
He married on 6 October 1785 to Princess Marie Françoise Maximilienne of Saint Mauris-Montbarrey (2 November 1761 – 2 February 1838), the daughter of Prince Alexandre Marie Léonor de Saint-Mauris de Montbarrey. They left no issue.

== Ancestors ==
Ancestors of Henry Louis, Prince of Nassau-Saarbrücken

16. Walrad, Prince of Nassau-Usingen
8. William Henry, Prince of Nassau-Usingen
17. Catherine Françoise de Croÿ-Roeulx
4. William Henry, Prince of Nassau-Saarbrücken
18. Henry, Prince of Nassau-Dillenburg
9. Charlotte Amalia of Nassau-Dillenburg
19. Dorothea Elisabeth of Brieg
2. Louis, Prince of Nassau-Saarbrücken
20. George Albert II of Erbach-Fürstenau
10. George William of Erbach
21. Anna Dorothea Christina of Hohenlohe-Waldenburg
5. Sophie of Erbach-Erbach
22. John Caspar of Bothmer
11. Sophia Charlotte of Bothmer
23. Gisela Erdmuthe of Hoym
1. Henry Louis, Prince of Nassau-Saarbrücken
24. Louis Frederick I, Prince of Schwarzburg-Rudolstadt
12. Frederick Anton, Prince of Schwarzburg-Rudolstadt
25. Anna Sophie of Saxe-Gotha-Altenburg
6. John Frederick, Prince of Schwarzburg-Rudolstadt
26. John Ernest IV, Duke of Saxe-Coburg-Saalfeld
13. Sophia Wilhelmina of Saxe-Coburg-Saalfeld
27. Charlotte Johanna of Waldeck-Wildungen
3. Wilhelmine of Schwarzburg-Rudolstadt
28. Johann Ernst III, Duke of Saxe-Weimar
14. Ernest Augustus I, Duke of Saxe-Weimar-Eisenach
29. Sophie Auguste of Anhalt-Zerbst
7. Bernardina Christina Sophia of Saxe-Weimar-Eisenach
30. Emmanuel Lebrecht, Prince of Anhalt-Köthen
15. Eleonore Wilhelmine of Anhalt-Köthen
31. Gisela Agnes of Rath

== Footnotes ==
Henry Louis, Prince of Nassau-Saarbrücken House of Nassau Born: 9 March 1768 Died: 27 April 1797
Preceded by Louis	Prince of Nassau-Saarbrücken; 1794-1797	Succeeded by Charles William
