= Princess Charlotte Sophie of Saxe-Coburg-Saalfeld =

Princess Charlotte Sophie
- Hereditary Princess of Mecklenburg-Schwerin
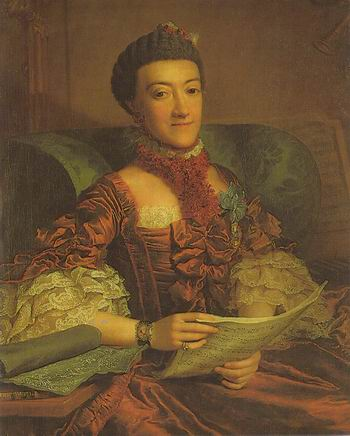
- Portrait by Georg David Matthieu
- Born: 24 September 1731; Coburg
- Died: 2 August 1810 (aged 78); Schwerin
- Spouse: Ludwig, Hereditary Prince of Mecklenburg-Schwerin (m. 1755; died 1778)
- Issue: Frederick Francis I, Grand Duke of Mecklenburg-Schwerin; Sophia Frederica, Hereditary Princess of Denmark and Norway
- House: Wettin
- Father: Francis Josias, Duke of Saxe-Coburg-Saalfeld
- Mother: Princess Anna Sophie of Schwarzburg-Rudolstadt

Princess Charlotte Sophie of Saxe-Coburg-Saalfeld, Duchess in Saxony (24 September 1731 – 2 August 1810) was a German duchess. She was the daughter of Franz Josias, Duke of Saxe-Coburg-Saalfeld and Princess Anna Sophie of Schwarzburg-Rudolstadt.

== Marriage and issue ==
Charlotte Sophie married Louis, Hereditary Prince of Mecklenburg-Schwerin (6 August 1725 – 12 September 1778), younger son of Christian Ludwig II, Duke of Mecklenburg-Schwerin. They had two children:

| Name | Birth | Death | Marriage/notes |
|---|---|---|---|
| Friedrich Franz | 10 December 1756 | 1 February 1837 | Princess Louise of Saxe-Gotha-Altenburg m. 1 June 1775 at Gotha; had issue |
| Sophia Frederica | 24 August 1758 | 29 November 1794 | Hereditary Prince Frederick of Denmark and Norway m. 21 October 1774 at Copenhagen; had issue (including Christian VIII of Denmark) |

== Ancestry ==
Ancestors of Princess Charlotte Sophie of Saxe-Coburg-Saalfeld

8. Ernest I, Duke of Saxe-Gotha
4. John Ernest IV, Duke of Saxe-Coburg-Saalfeld
9. Elisabeth Sophie of Saxe-Altenburg
2. Francis Josias, Duke of Saxe-Coburg-Saalfeld
10. Josias II, Count of Waldeck-Wildungen
5. Countess Charlotte Johanna of Waldeck-Wildungen
11. Wilhelmine Christine of Nassau-Siegen
1. Charlotte Sophie of Saxe-Coburg-Saalfeld
12. Albert Anton, Prince of Schwarzburg-Rudolstadt
6. Louis Frederick I, Prince of Schwarzburg-Rudolstadt
13. Emilie Juliane of Barby-Mühlingen
3. Anna Sophie of Schwarzburg-Rudolstadt
14. Frederick I, Duke of Saxe-Gotha-Altenburg
7. Anna Sophie of Saxe-Gotha-Altenburg
15. Magdalena Sibylla of Saxe-Weissenfels
