= Ernest Frederick, Duke of Saxe-Coburg-Saalfeld =

Ernest Frederick
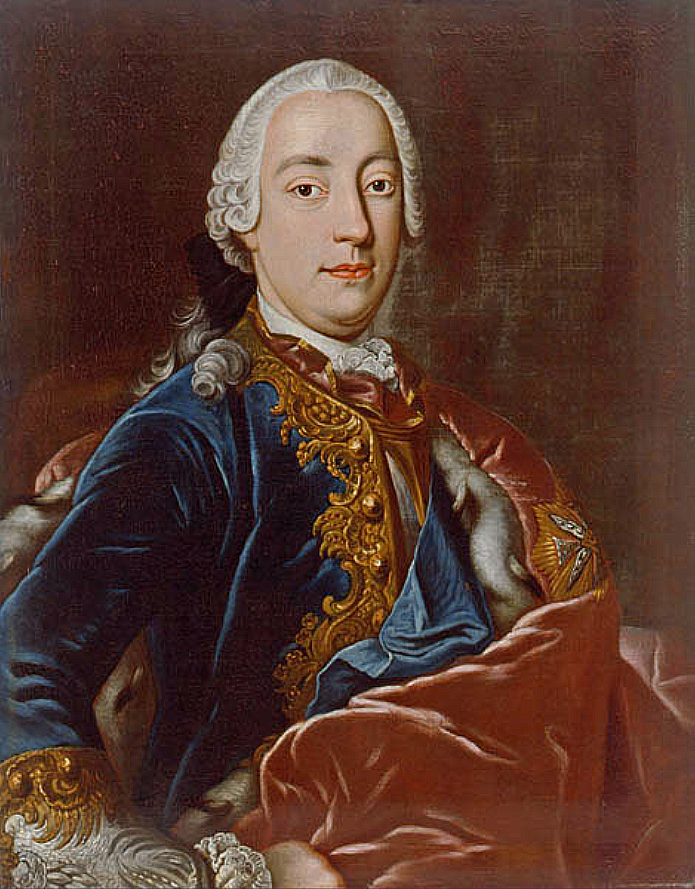

Duke of Saxe-Coburg-Saalfeld
- Reign: 16 September 1764 – 8 September 1800
- Predecessor: Francis Josias
- Successor: Francis
- Born: 8 March 1724; Saalfeld, Saxe-Coburg-Saalfeld, Holy Roman Empire
- Died: 8 September 1800 (aged 76); Coburg, Saxe-Coburg-Saalfeld, Holy Roman Empire
- Spouse: Sophia Antonia of Brunswick-Wolfenbüttel (m. 1749)
- Issue: Francis; Prince Karl Wilhelm; Princess Fredericka; Princess Caroline; Prince Ludwig Karl; Prince Ferdinand August; Prince Frederick
- House: Saxe-Coburg-Saalfeld
- Father: Francis Josias, Duke of Saxe-Coburg-Saalfeld
- Mother: Anna Sophie of Schwarzburg-Rudolstadt
- Religion: Lutheranism

Ernest Frederick, Duke of Saxe-Coburg-Saalfeld (German: Ernst Friedrich, Herzog von Sachsen-Coburg-Saalfeld; 8 March 1724 – 8 September 1800), was a Duke of Saxe-Coburg-Saalfeld.

== Biography ==
He was the eldest son of Francis Josias, Duke of Saxe-Coburg-Saalfeld and his wife, Anna Sophie of Schwarzburg-Rudolstadt.

Ernest Frederick succeeded his father in the Duchy of Saxe-Coburg-Saalfeld when he died in 1764 and established his definitive residence shifted in Coburg.

Because of the high indebtedness of the duchy he was compelled by Emperor Joseph II in 1773 to work with a Debit commission—an obligatory administration of debts assigned by the emperor—for over thirty years.

== Marriage and issue ==
In Wolfenbüttel on 23 April 1749, Ernest Frederick married with Sophia Antonia of Brunswick-Wolfenbüttel, member of the House of Welf, the daughter and the eight of thirteen children of Ferdinand Albert II, Duke of Brunswick-Wolfenbüttel and Princess Antoinette of Brunswick-Wolfenbüttel, younger sister of Empress Elisabeth Christine, mother of Empress Maria Theresa.

They had seven children:

1. Franz Frederick Anton, Duke of Saxe-Coburg-Saalfeld (b. Coburg, 15 July 1750 – d. Coburg, 9 December 1806), father of Leopold I of Belgium and grandfather of Leopold II, Empress Carlota of Mexico, Queen Victoria of the United Kingdom, and her husband Prince Albert.
2. Karl Wilhelm Ferdinand (b. Coburg, 21 November 1751 – d. Coburg, 16 February 1757).
3. Fredericka Juliane (b. Coburg, 14 September 1752 – d. Coburg, 24 September 1752).
4. Caroline Ulrike Amalie (b. Coburg, 19 October 1753 – d. Coburg, 1 October 1829), a nun at Gandersheim.
5. Ludwig Karl Frederick (b. Coburg, 2 January 1755 – d. Coburg, 4 May 1806); he had an illegitimate son with Mademoiselle Brutel de la Rivière: Ludwig Frederick Emil von Coburg (b. Hildburghausen, 1779 – d. Coburg, 1827). In turn, the five children of Ludwig Frederick were created Freiherren von Coburg. His descendants are still alive.
6. Ferdinand August Heinrich (b. Coburg, 12 April 1756 – d. Coburg, 8 July 1758).
7. Frederick (b. Coburg, 4 March 1758 – d. Coburg, 26 June 1758).

== Death ==
Duke Erenst Frederick died on 8 September 1800 in Coburg, Saxe-Coburg-Saalfeld, Holy Roman Empire, aged 76.

His body was interred, alongside his wife Duchess Sophia Antonia, in the Morizkirche, Coburg, Germany.

== Ancestry ==
Ancestors of Ernest Frederick, Duke of Saxe-Coburg-Saalfeld

8. Ernest I, Duke of Saxe-Gotha
4. John Ernest IV, Duke of Saxe-Coburg-Saalfeld
9. Elisabeth Sophie of Saxe-Altenburg
2. Francis Josias, Duke of Saxe-Coburg-Saalfeld
10. Josias II, Count of Waldeck-Wildungen
5. Charlotte Johanna of Waldeck-Wildungen
11. Wilhelmine Christine of Nassau-Siegen
1. Ernest Frederick, Duke of Saxe-Coburg-Saalfeld
12. Albert Anton, Prince of Schwarzburg-Rudolstadt
6. Louis Frederick I, Prince of Schwarzburg-Rudolstadt
13. Countess Emilie Juliane of Barby-Mühlingen
3. Anna Sophie of Schwarzburg-Rudolstadt
14. Frederick I, Duke of Saxe-Gotha-Altenburg
7. Anna Sophie of Saxe-Gotha-Altenburg
15. Magdalena Sibylle of Saxe-Weissenfels

Ernest Frederick, Duke of Saxe-Coburg-Saalfeld House of Wettin Born: 8 March 1724 Died: 8 September 1800
Regnal titles
Preceded by Francis Josias	Duke of Saxe-Coburg-Saalfeld; 1764–1800	Succeeded by Francis Frederick
