= John Frederick, Prince of Schwarzburg-Rudolstadt =

Prince of Schwarzburg-Rudolstadt

John Frederick
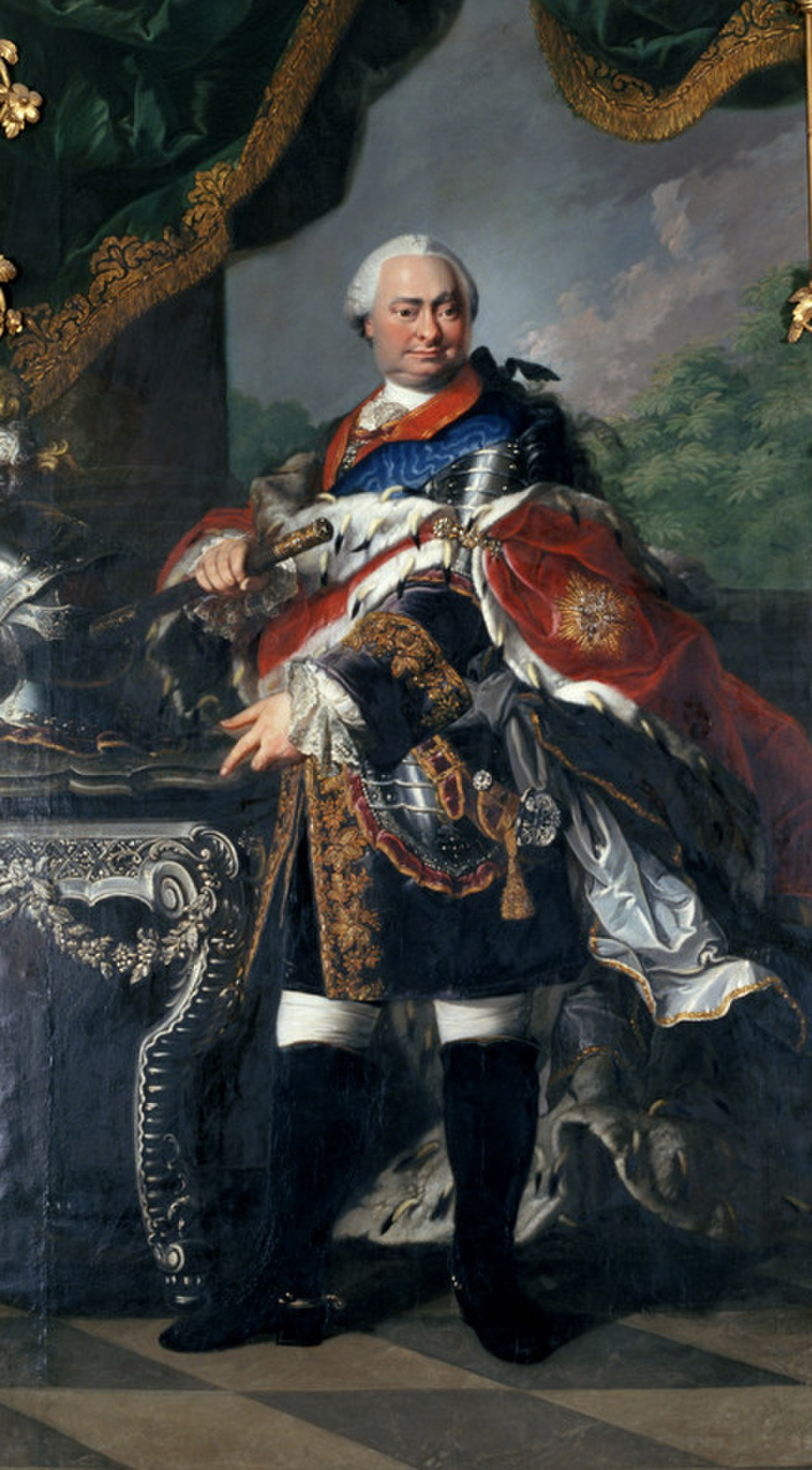
- Portrait c. 1765–1766

Prince of Schwarzburg-Rudolstadt
- Reign: 1 September 1744 – 10 July 1767
- Predecessor: Frederick Anton
- Successor: Louis Günther II
- Born: 8 January 1721; Rudolstadt, Schwarzburg-Rudolstadt (present-day Thuringia, Germany)
- Died: 10 July 1767 (aged 46); Rudolstadt
- Spouse: Bernardina Christina Sophia of Saxe-Weimar-Eisenach
- Issue: Wilhelmina, Princess of Nassau-Saarbrücken
- House: House of Schwarzburg
- Father: Frederick Anton, Prince of Schwarzburg-Rudolstadt
- Mother: Sophia Wilhelmina of Saxe-Coburg-Saalfeld

Johann Friedrich, Prince of Schwarzburg-Rudolstadt (8 January 1721 in Rudolstadt – 10 July 1767 in ibid) was the ruling Prince of Schwarzburg-Rudolstadt from 1744 to 1767.

== Life ==
John Frederick von Schwarzburg-Rudolstadt was the only son of Frederick Anton, Prince of Schwarzburg-Rudolstadt and his first wife, Princess Sophia Wilhelmina of Saxe-Coburg-Saalfeld.

John Frederick mastered the French language. Between 1738 and 1742, John Frederick made a Grand Tour. He attended lectures on theology at the University of Strasbourg and lectures on mathematics and physics at the University of Utrecht. During his Grand Tour, he came into contact with the ideas of the Age of Enlightenment. He later tried to reconcile these ideas with his faith.

In 1742, John Frederick represented his father at the coronation of Emperor Charles. The ceremony in Frankfurt Cathedral lasted several hours and John Frederick found it very impressive.

In 1744, at the age of 23, he inherited the Principality of Schwarzburg-Rudolstadt. He continued the Heidecksburg construction project his father had begun. His father had built the exterior of the castle, John Frederick took up decorating the interior. He commissioned frescoed ceilings and overdoor ornaments. In 1750, the ballroom was completed by Gottfried Heinrich Krohne. It is considered a prime example of Rococo interior design in Germany.

The princely collection of sheet music had been lost in a fire in 1735. John Frederick started a new collection to replace it. Georg Gebel composed at least nine opera libretti and about a hundred symphonies, partitas and concerts. In 1746, John Frederick rewarded him with the title of Concertmeister and in 1750 with the title of Kapellmeister. In 1754, Christian Gotthelf Scheinpflug succeeded gebel as Kapellmeister. He composed music for all kinds of courtly occasions.

In 1746, he founded a theological seminary and supported the founding of an extensive public library. He added his private library to the existing collection and from 1751 onwards, he allowed the general public to access it once a week. He considerably extended the collection of the "Princely public library Rudolstadt", founded in 1748, be purchasing scientific literature and numerous valuable books, incunables and oriental manuscripts. The collection is currently split between the Historischen Bibliothek der Stadt Rudolstadt, and the Schlossbibliothek Heidecksburg.

On 4 October 1760, John Frederick granted a license to operate a porcelain factory to Georg Heinrich Macheleid. John Frederick himself acted as a director for this company, which still exists under the name of Aelteste Volkstedter Porzellanmanufaktur.

On 20 January 1764, the local gymnasium celebrated its centenary. On this occasion, John Frederick officially named the building Gymnasium Friedericianum and added a position teaching mathematics and physics. The ceremony was attended by the Prince and the entire princely household.

John Frederick died on 10 July 1767. As he had no male heir, he was succeeded by his uncle Louis Günther II. In 1763, Louis Günther II's eldest son, the new Hereditary Prince Frederick Charles, had married John Frederick's eldest daughter, Frederike.

== Marriage and issue ==
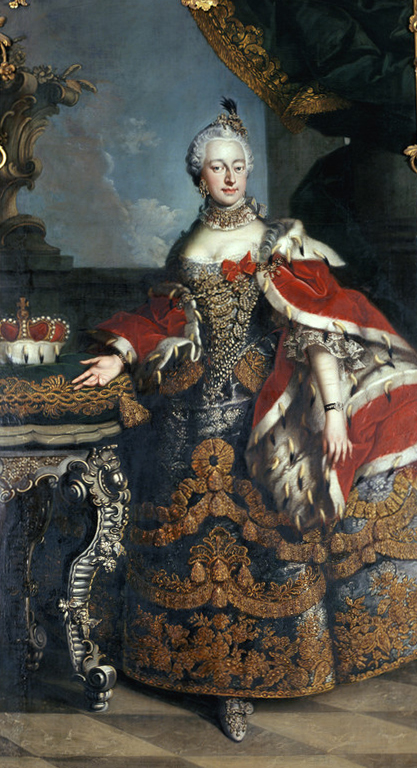
Bernardine of Saxe-Weimar-Eisenach, painted by Heinsius

John Frederick married on 19 November 1744 in Eisenach to Princess Bernardina Christina Sophia of Saxe-Weimar-Eisenach. They had the following children:

- Princess Frederike of Schwarzburg-Rudolstadt (1745–1778); married on 1763 Frederick Charles, Prince of Schwarzburg-Rudolstadt (1736-1793)
- Daughter (1746-1746)
- Son (1747-1747)
- Princess Sophie Ernestine of Schwarzburg-Rudolstadt (1749–1754)
- Princess Wilhelmina of Schwarzburg-Rudolstadt (1751–1780); married in 1766 Louis, Prince of Nassau-Saarbrücken (1745-1794).
- Princess Henrietta Charlotte of Schwarzburg-Rudolstadt (1752–1756)

== Ancestry ==
Ancestors of John Frederick, Prince of Schwarzburg-Rudolstadt

16. Louis Günther I, Count of Schwarzburg-Rudolstadt
8. Albert Anton, Prince of Schwarzburg-Rudolstadt
17. Emilie of Oldenburg-Delmenhorst
4. Louis Frederick I, Prince of Schwarzburg-Rudolstadt
18. Albert Frederick I of Barby-Mühlingen
9. Countess Emilie Juliane of Barby-Mühlingen
19. Sophia Ursula of Oldenburg-Delmenhorst
2. Frederick Anton, Prince of Schwarzburg-Rudolstadt
20. Ernest I, Duke of Saxe-Gotha
10. Frederick I, Duke of Saxe-Gotha-Altenburg
21. Princess Elisabeth Sophie of Saxe-Altenburg
5. Anna Sophie of Saxe-Gotha-Altenburg
22. Augustus, Duke of Saxe-Weissenfels
11. Magdalena Sibylle of Saxe-Weissenfels
23. Anna Maria of Mecklenburg-Schwerin
1. John Frederick, Prince of Schwarzburg-Rudolstadt
24. John II, Duke of Saxe-Weimar
12. Ernest I, Duke of Saxe-Gotha
25. Dorothea Maria of Anhalt
6. John Ernest IV, Duke of Saxe-Coburg-Saalfeld
26. Johann Philipp, Duke of Saxe-Altenburg
13. Elisabeth Sophie of Saxe-Altenburg
27. Elisabeth of Brünswick-Wolfenbüttel
3. Sophia Wilhelmina of Saxe-Coburg-Saalfeld
28. Philip VII, Count of Waldeck-Wildungen
14. Josias II, Count of Waldeck-Wildungen
29. Anna Catherine of Sayn-Wittgenstein
7. Charlotte Johanna of Waldeck-Wildungen
30. William, Count of Nassau-Siegen
15. Wilhelmine Christine of Nassau-Siegen
31. Christiane of Erbach

== Footnotes ==
John Frederick, Prince of Schwarzburg-Rudolstadt House of Schwarzburg Born: 8 January 1721 Died: 10 July 1767
| Preceded by Frederick Anton | Prince of Schwarzburg-Rudolstadt; 1744-1767 | Succeeded by Louis Günther II |
