= Princess Wilhelmina of Schwarzburg-Rudolstadt =

Wilhelmina of Schwarzburg-Rudolstadt
- Princess of Nassau-Saarbrücken
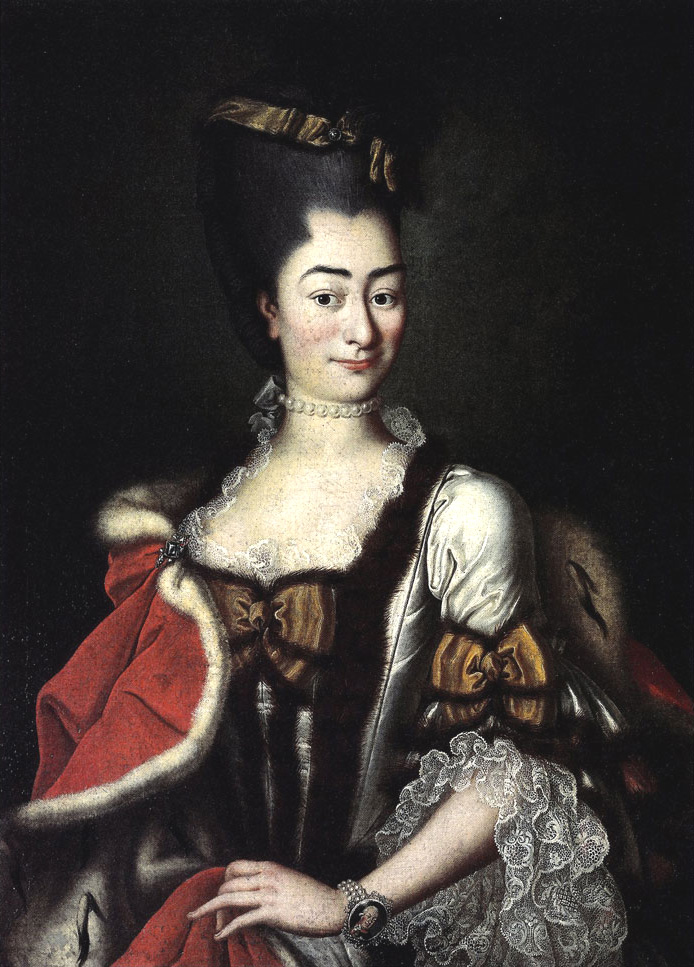
- Born: 22 January 1751; Rudolstadt
- Died: 17 July 1780 (aged 29); Saarbrücken
- Spouse: Louis, Prince of Nassau-Saarbrücken (m. 1766)
- Issue: Henry Louis, Prince of Nassau-Saarbrücken
- House: House of Schwarzburg
- Father: John Frederick, Prince of Schwarzburg-Rudolstadt
- Mother: Princess Bernardina of Saxe-Weimar-Eisenach

Princess Wilhelmina of Schwarzburg-Rudolstadt (22 January 1751 – 17 July 1780) was the consort of Louis, Prince of Nassau-Saarbrücken and was a daughter of John Frederick, Prince of Schwarzburg-Rudolstadt.

== Early life ==
Wilhelmina was born on January 22, 1751 in Rudolstadt. She was the third child and third daughter in the family of Prince Johann Friedrich of Schwarzburg-Rudolstadt and his wife Princess Bernardina Christina Sophia of Saxe-Weimar-Eisenach. She had two older sisters, Frederika Sophia Schwartzburg-Rudolstadt and Sophia Ernestina. The family lived in the Heidecksburg Palace.

She lost her mother at the age of 6. Her father never married again.

== Personal life ==
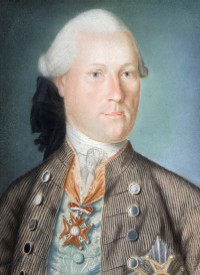
Portrait of her husband Louis, by unknown

At the age of 15, Wilhelmina was given to the 21-year-old Crown Prince Ludwig of Nassau-Saarbrücken in marriage. The wedding took place on October 30, 1766 in Schwarzburg Castle. She was unhappy in her marriage and Wihelmina retreated to Halberg Castle, where she raised their son:

- Heinrich Ludwig (1768–1797), who married Maria Francisca von Montbarey during the occupation of the country by the French. They had no children.

The married life of the ruling couple turned out to be unhappy, and Wilhelmina and her son settled in the Montplaisir palace on the Halberg mountain.

The princess died young on June 17, 1780 at the age of 29. After her death, in a morganaticly married Katharina Kest, a commoner who Louis created Countess of Ottweiler. In 1787, the Emperor legitimized their marriage. In 1789, Louis XVI of France conferred upon Katharina the title Duchess of Dillange. Following the death of Louis in March 1794, her son became reigning Prince of Nassau-Saarbrücken from 1794 until his death in 1797. A typical representative of enlightened absolutism, he carried out contemporary reforms. Embodying the policy of austerity, however, he allocated money for construction.

== Ancestry ==
Ancestors of Princess Wilhelmina of Schwarzburg-Rudolstadt

8. Louis Frederick I, Prince of Schwarzburg-Rudolstadt
4. Frederick Anton, Prince of Schwarzburg-Rudolstadt
9. Princess Anna Sophie of Saxe-Gotha-Altenburg
2. John Frederick, Prince of Schwarzburg-Rudolstadt
10. John Ernest IV, Duke of Saxe-Coburg-Saalfeld
5. Princess Sophia Wilhelmina of Saxe-Coburg-Saalfeld
11. Countess Charlotte Johanna of Waldeck-Wildungen
1. Princess Wilhelmina of Schwarzburg-Rudolstadt
12. Johann Ernst III, Duke of Saxe-Weimar
6. Ernest Augustus I, Duke of Saxe-Weimar-Eisenach
13. Princess Sophie Auguste of Anhalt-Zerbst
3. Princess Bernardina of Saxe-Weimar-Eisenach
14. Emmanuel Lebrecht, Prince of Anhalt-Köthen
7. Eleonore Wilhelmine of Anhalt-Köthen
15. Gisela Agnes of Rath
