= Princess Frederica Caroline of Saxe-Coburg-Saalfeld =

German princess

Princess Frederica Caroline
- Margravine of Brandenburg-Ansbach
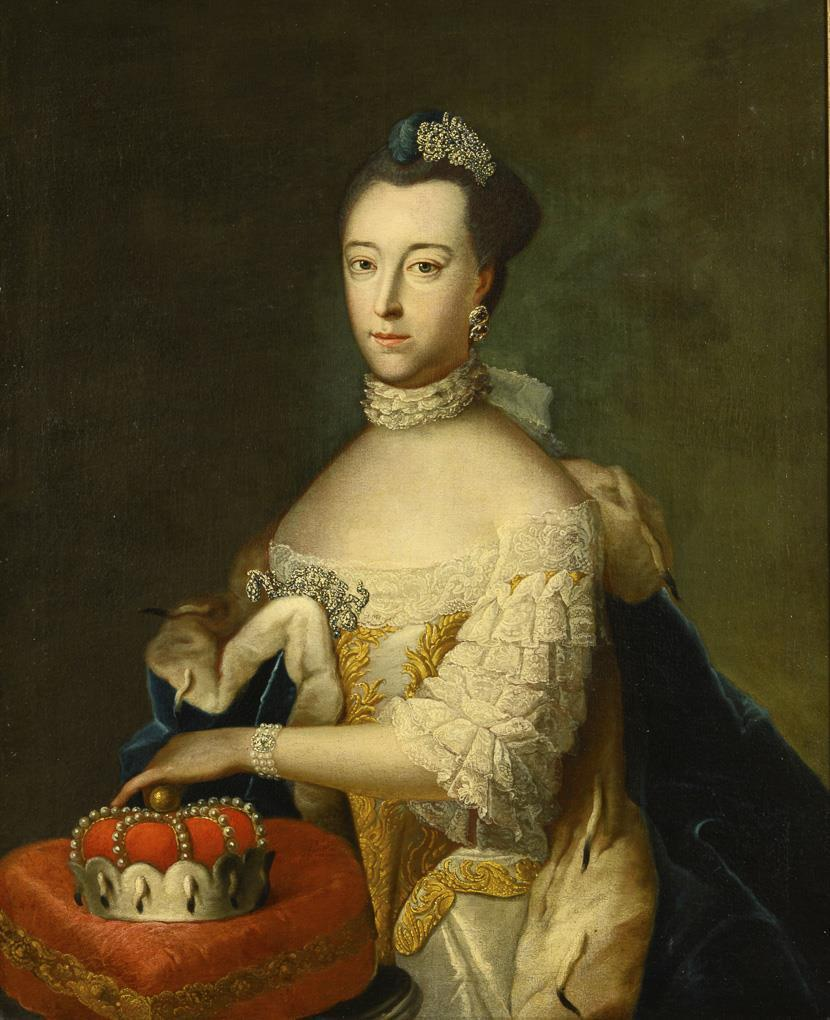
- Born: 24 June 1735; Coburg
- Died: 18 February 1791 (aged 55); Unterschwaningen
- Spouse: Charles Alexander, Margrave of Brandenburg-Ansbach (m. 1754)
- House: Wettin
- Father: Francis Josias, Duke of Saxe-Coburg-Saalfeld
- Mother: Princess Anna Sophie of Schwarzburg-Rudolstadt

Princess Frederica Caroline of Saxe-Coburg-Saalfeld (24 June 1735 – 18 February 1791) was a princess of Saxe-Coburg-Saalfeld by birth and, through marriage, the last Margravine of Brandenburg-Ansbach and Bayreuth.

== Biography ==
Frederica Caroline was the fifth child and youngest daughter of Franz Josias, Duke of Saxe-Coburg-Saalfeld and Princess Anna Sophie of Schwarzburg-Rudolstadt (1700–1780), daughter of Louis Frederick I, Prince of Schwarzburg-Rudolstadt.

=== Marriage ===
On 22 November 1754 in Coburg, Frederica Caroline married Margrave Karl Alexander of Brandenburg-Ansbach and Bayreuth (1736-1806). The marriage was concluded for dynastic reasons. Although Frederica Caroline was considered virtuous, gentle, charitable and devout, her husband found her ugly, ignorant and boring. Their marriage was childless. Frederica Caroline moved to Schwaningen Castle in Unterschwaningen, and her husband moved to live with his mistress Elizabeth Craven, Baroness Craven of Hamstead Marshall.

Frederica Caroline's brother, Prince Josias of Saxe-Coburg-Saalfeld, owed his sister admission to the regiment as a captain.

=== Death ===
After Frederica Caroline's death in 1791, her husband abdicated as Margrave and sold the Margravate to Prussia,. Frederica Caroline is buried in the Gumbertuskirche in Ansbach, Bavaria, Germany.

== Ancestry ==
Ancestors of Princess Frederica Caroline of Saxe-Coburg-Saalfeld

16. John II, Duke of Saxe-Weimar
8. Ernest I, Duke of Saxe-Gotha
17. Dorothea Maria of Anhalt
4. John Ernest IV, Duke of Saxe-Coburg-Saalfeld
18. Johann Philipp, Duke of Saxe-Altenburg
9. Elisabeth Sophie of Saxe-Altenburg
19. Elisabeth of Brünswick-Wolfenbüttel
2. Francis Josias, Duke of Saxe-Coburg-Saalfeld
20. Philipp VII, Count of Waldeck-Wildungen
10. Josias II, Count of Waldeck and Pyrmont
21. Anna of Sayn-Wittgenstein
5. Charlotte Johanne of Waldeck-Pyrmont
22. Wilhelm, Count of Nassau-Siegen
11. Wilhelmine Christine of Nassau-Siegen
23. Christina, Countess of Erbach
1. Frederica Caroline of Saxe-Coburg-Saalfeld
24. Louis Guenther I, Count of Schwarzburg
12. Albrecht Anton, Count of Schwarzburg-Rudolstadt
25. Emilie von Oldenburg-Delmenhorst
6. Louis Frederick I, Prince of Schwarzburg-Rudolstadt
26. Albert Frederick of Barby-Mühlingen
13. Emilie Juliana von Barby-Mühlingen
27. Sophie Ursula of Oldenburg-Delmenhorst
3. Anna Sophie of Schwarzburg-Rudolstadt
28. Ernest I, Duke of Saxe-Gotha (= 8)
14. Frederick I, Duke of Saxe-Gotha-Altenburg
29. Elisabeth Sophie of Saxe-Altenburg (= 9)
7. Anna Sophie of Saxe-Gotha-Altenburg
30. August, Duke of Saxe-Weissenfels
15. Magdalena Sibylle of Saxe-Weissenfels
31. Anna Maria of Mecklenburg-Schwerin

Princess Frederica Caroline of Saxe-Coburg-Saalfeld House of Wettin Born: 24 June 1735 Died: 18 February 1791
German nobility
Vacant Title last held by Princess Friederike Luise of Prussia	Margravine of Brandenburg-Ansbach; 3 August 1757 – 18 February 1791	Vacant Title next held by None
