= Princess Anna Sophia of Schwarzburg-Rudolstadt =

Princess Anna Sophie
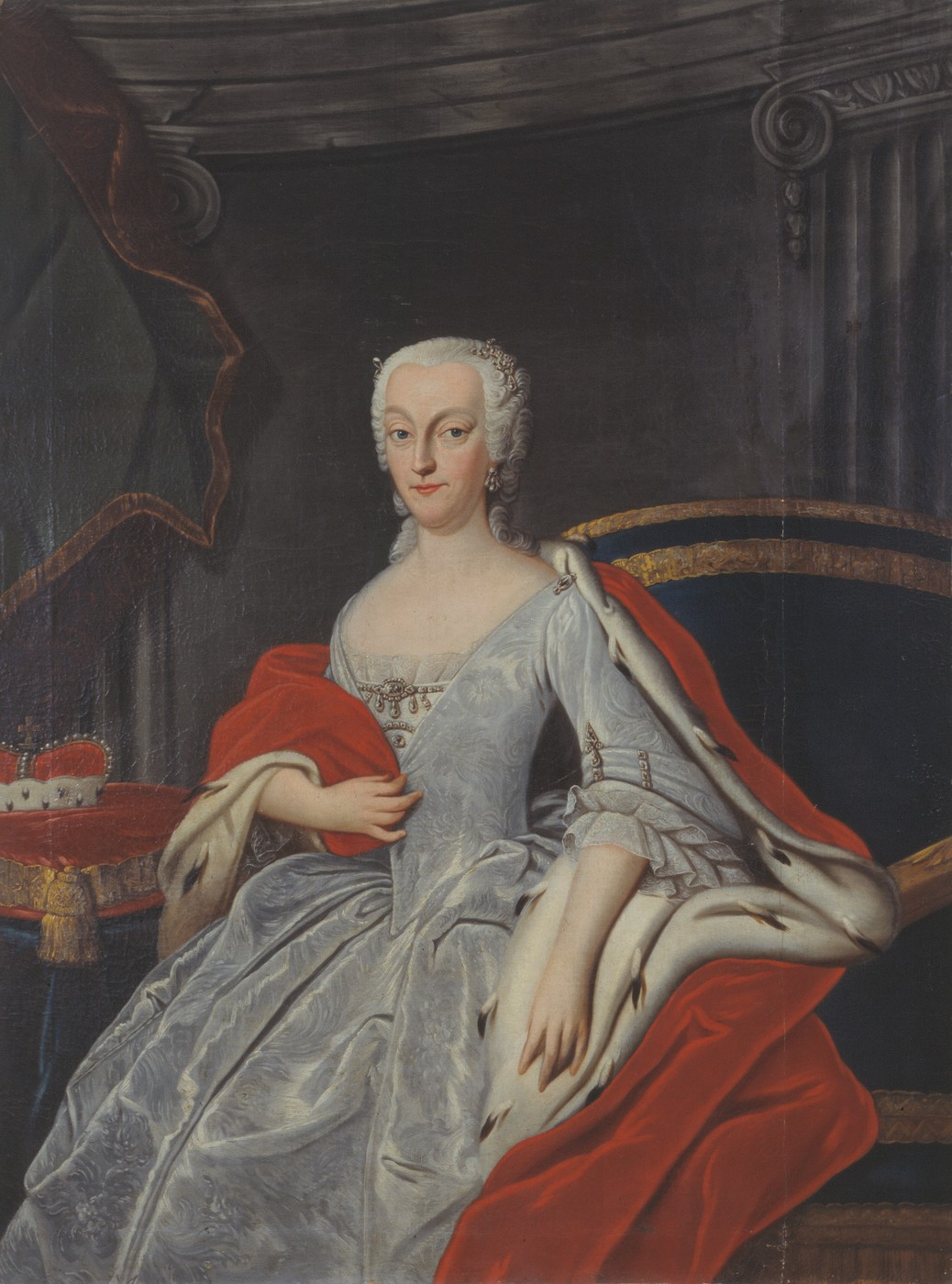

Duchess consort of Saxe-Coburg-Saalfeld
- Tenure: 4 September 1745 – 16 September 1764
- Born: 9 September 1700; Rudolstadt
- Died: 11 December 1780 (aged 80); Römhild
- Spouse: Francis Josias, Duke of Saxe-Coburg-Saalfeld (m. 1723; died 1764)
- Issue: Ernest Frederick, Duke of Saxe-Coburg-Saalfeld; Prince Johann Wilhelm; Prince Christian Franz; Charlotte Sophie, Duchess Louis of Mecklenburg-Schwerin; Fredericka Caroline, Margravine of Brandenburg-Ansbach; Prince Josias
- House: Schwarzburg
- Father: Louis Frederick I, Prince of Schwarzburg-Rudolstadt
- Mother: Anna Sophie of Saxe-Gotha-Altenburg

Princess Anna Sophie of Schwarzburg-Rudolstadt (9 September 1700 – 11 December 1780) was a Princess of Schwarzburg-Rudolstadt.

She was the daughter of Louis Frederick I, Prince of Schwarzburg-Rudolstadt (15 October 1667 – 24 June 1718) and Anna Sophie of Saxe-Gotha-Altenburg (1670–1728).

== Family ==
On 2 January 1723 in Rudolstadt, she married Franz Josias, Duke of Saxe-Coburg-Saalfeld. They had eight children:

- Ernest Frederick, Duke of Saxe-Coburg-Saalfeld (Saalfeld, 8 March 1724 – Coburg, 8 September 1800); great-grandfather of King Leopold II of Belgium, Empress Charlotte of Mexico, Queen Victoria, and Prince Albert.
- Prince Johann Wilhelm of Saxe-Coburg-Saalfeld (Coburg, 11 May 1726 – Hohenfriedberg, 4 June 1745); killed in battle.
- Princess Anna Sophia of Saxe-Coburg-Saalfeld (Coburg, 3 September 1727 – Coburg, 10 November 1728)
- Prince Christian Franz of Saxe-Coburg-Saalfeld (Coburg, 25 January 1730 – Coburg, 18 September 1797)
- Princess Charlotte Sophie of Saxe-Coburg-Saalfeld (Coburg, 24 September 1731 – Schwerin, 2 August 1810); married on 13 May 1755 Duke Ludwig of Mecklenburg-Schwerin.
- Princess Friederike Magdalene of Saxe-Coburg-Saalfeld (Coburg, 21 August 1733 – Coburg, 29 March 1734)
- Princess Friederike Caroline of Saxe-Coburg-Saalfeld (Coburg, 24 June 1735 – Schloß Schwaningen, 18 February 1791), married on 22 November 1754 Karl Alexander, Margrave of Brandenburg-Ansbach.
- Prince Friedrich Josias of Saxe-Coburg-Saalfeld (Ehrenburg Palace, Coburg, 26 December 1737 – Coburg, 26 February 1815)

== Ancestry ==
Ancestors of Princess Anna Sophia of Schwarzburg-Rudolstadt

8. Louis Günther I, Count of Schwarzburg-Rudolstadt
4. Albert Anton, Prince of Schwarzburg-Rudolstadt
9. Emilie of Oldenburg-Delmenhorst
2. Louis Frederick I, Prince of Schwarzburg-Rudolstadt
10. Albert Frederick of Barby-Mühlingen
5. Emilie Juliana of Barby-Mühlingen
11. Sophie Ursula of Oldenburg-Delmenhorst
1. Anna Sophie of Schwarzburg-Rudolstadt
12. Ernest I, Duke of Saxe-Gotha
6. Frederick I, Duke of Saxe-Gotha-Altenburg
13. Princess Elisabeth Sophie of Saxe-Altenburg
3. Anna Sophie of Saxe-Gotha-Altenburg
14. August, Duke of Saxe-Weissenfels
7. Magdalena Sibylle of Saxe-Weissenfels
15. Anna Maria of Mecklenburg-Schwerin

Princess Anna Sophia of Schwarzburg-Rudolstadt House of Schwarzburg-Rudolstadt Cadet branch of the House of Schwarzburg Born: 9 September 1700 Died: 11 December 1780
German royalty
Title created	Duchess consort of Saxe-Coburg-Saalfeld; 4 September 1745 – 16 September 1764	Succeeded by Sophia Antonia of Brunswick-Wolfenbüttel
