= Frederick Charles, Prince of Schwarzburg-Rudolstadt =

Prince of Schwarzburg-Rudolstadt

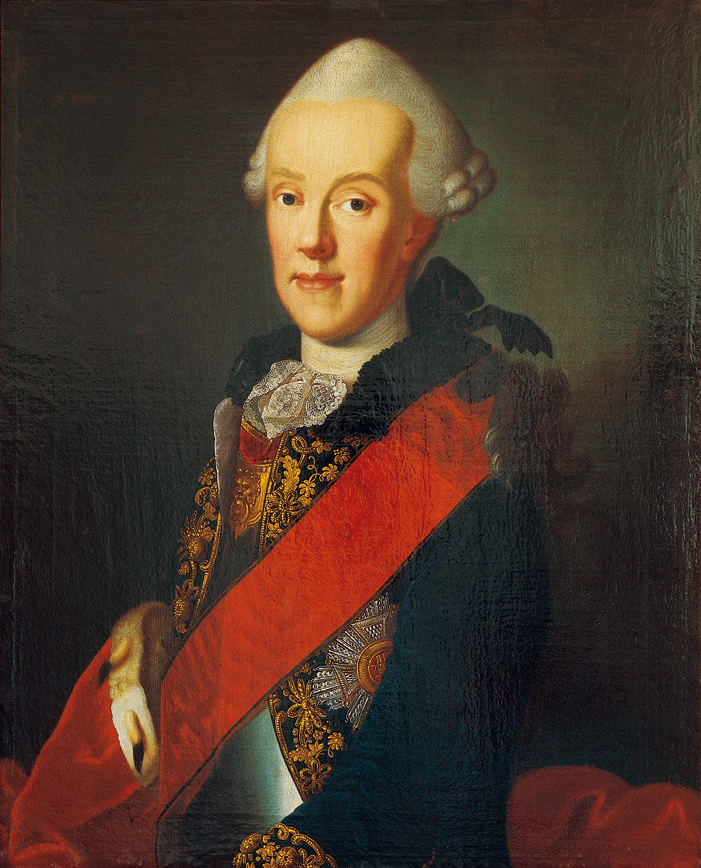

Prince of Schwarzburg-Rudolstadt
- Reign: 29 August 1790 – 13 April 1793
- Predecessor: Louis Günther II
- Successor: Louis Frederick II
- Born: 7 June 1736; Rudolstadt
- Died: 13 April 1793 (aged 56); Rudolstadt
- Spouse: Princess Friederike of Schwarzburg-Rudolstadt; Princess Auguste of Saxe-Gotha-Altenburg
- Issue: Louis Frederick II, Prince of Schwarzburg-Rudolstadt
- House: House of Schwarzburg
- Father: Louis Günther II, Prince of Schwarzburg-Rudolstadt
- Mother: Sophie Henriette of Reuss-Untergreiz

Prince Frederick Charles of Schwarzburg-Rudolstadt (7 June 1736 – 13 April 1793) was a German natural history collector, and from 1790 until his death the reigning Prince of Schwarzburg-Rudolstadt.

== Life ==
Frederick Charles of Schwarzburg-Rudolstadt was born in Rudolstadt, the son of Prince Louis Günther II of Schwarzburg-Rudolstadt and his wife Sophie Henriette, born Countess Reuss of Untergreiz. As a child, he began his natural history collection, which later went to the Natural History Museum of Rudolstadt. In 1757, he created the Princely Natural History Collection at the Ludwigsburg Castle in Rudolstadt. The collection was later enlarged, and in the 19th century, it occupied seven rooms in the castle. One of the first supervisors of the collection was Christoph Ludwig Kämmerer. In 1919, the collection was moved to Heidecksburg Castle.

Frederick Charles of Schwarzburg-Rudolstadt corresponded with Johann Heinrich Merck, among others, and let him have some rhinoceros bones and other pieces from his collection for research. Frederick Charles also corresponded with Johann August Ephraim Goeze, with the physician Friedrich Martini, with the vicar Johann Samuel Schröter and with Johann Ernst Immanuel Walch. He had personal and scientific relationships with his correspondents and kept their writings in the library of his Cabinet. Some of these writings were dedicated to him, for example the third volume of Martini's conchology text, published in 1777, was dedicated to His Princely Highness, the Crown Prince Frederick Charles of Schwarzburg-Rudolstadt, dedicated by his humble subject, the author. The second edition of Jacob Theodor Klein's Naturalis Dispositio; Echinodermatum was edited and revised by Nathaniel Gottfried Leske and was also dedicated to Frederick Charles.

In 1792, Frederick Charles built a theatre on the green in Rudolstadt. It was inaugurated a few weeks after his death. Johann Wolfgang von Goethe was its director from 1793 to 1803. It later evolved to form the Thuringia State Theatre in Rudolstadt.

== Marriage and issue ==
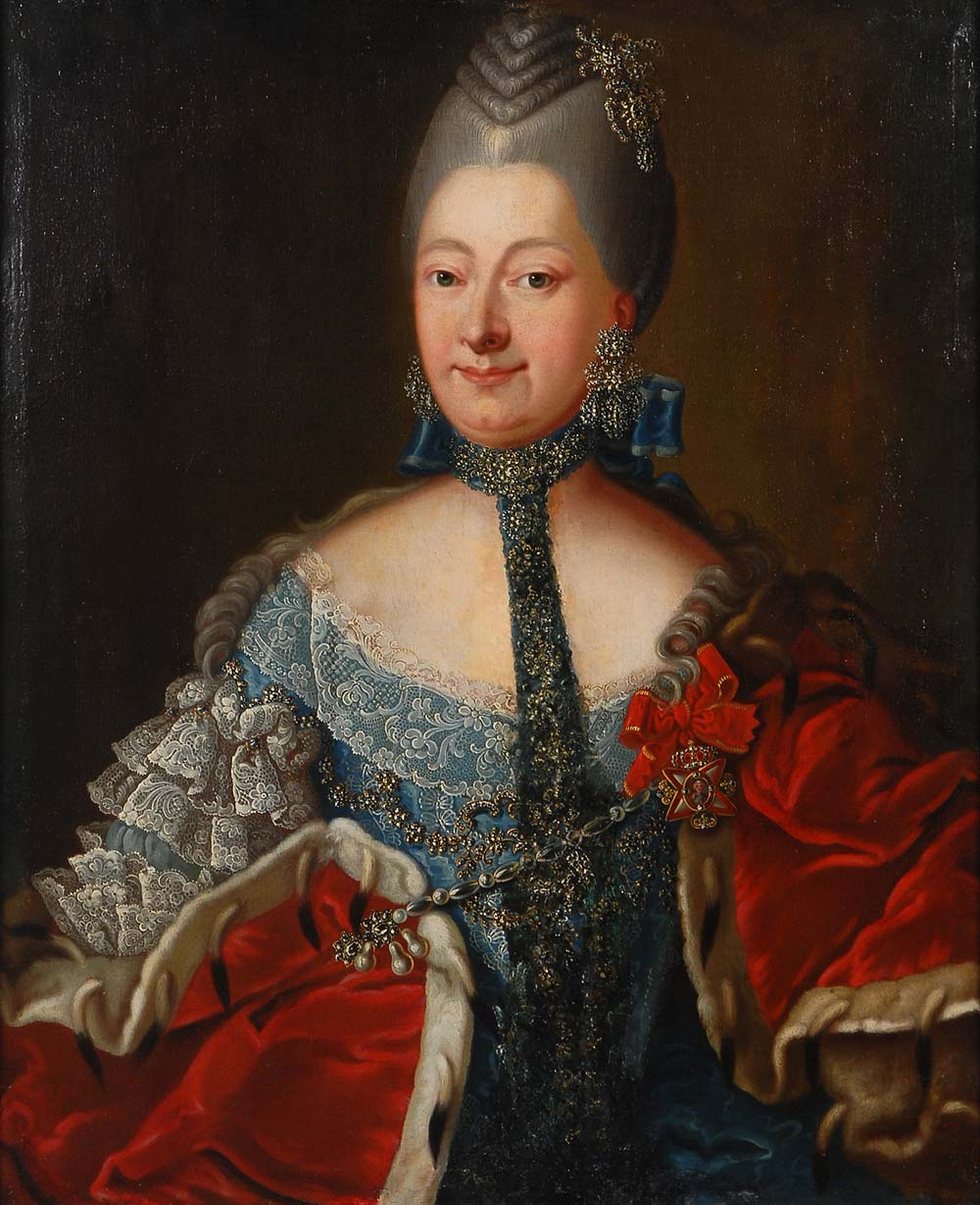
Friederike Sophie Auguste of Schwarzburg-Rudolstadt; portrait by Johann Ernst Heinsius

Frederick Charles married his first wife, Princess Friederike Sophie Auguste of Schwarzburg-Rudolstadt (1745–1778), in 1763. They had six children:

- Frederika (1765–1767)
- Louis Frederick II (1767–1807), Prince of Schwarzburg-Rudolstadt
- Henrietta (1770–1783)
- Charles Günther (1771–1825), married Louise Ulrike of Hesse-Homburg, daughter of Landgrave Frederick V; their daughter Karoline married Prince George Bernhard of Anhalt-Dessau
  - Prince Adolph of Schwarzburg-Rudolstadt
    - Günther Victor, Prince of Schwarzburg
- Caroline (1774–1854), married Prince Günther Frederick Charles I of Schwarzburg-Sondershausen
- Louise (1775–1808), married Landgrave Ernest Constantine of Hesse-Philippsthal

In 1780, Frederick Charles married his second wife, Princess Louise Friederike Auguste (1752–1805), the daughter of Prince John August of Saxe-Gotha-Altenburg. This marriage was childless.

== Ancestry ==
Ancestors of Frederick Charles, Prince of Schwarzburg-Rudolstadt

16. Louis Günther I, Count of Schwarzburg-Rudolstadt
8. Albert Anton, Prince of Schwarzburg-Rudolstadt
17. Emilie of Oldenburg-Delmenhorst
4. Louis Frederick I, Prince of Schwarzburg-Rudolstadt
18. Albert Frederick I of Barby-Mühlingen
9. Countess Emilie Juliane of Barby-Mühlingen
19. Sophia Ursula of Oldenburg-Delmenhorst
2. Louis Günther II, Prince of Schwarzburg-Rudolstadt
20. Ernest I, Duke of Saxe-Gotha
10. Frederick I, Duke of Saxe-Gotha-Altenburg
21. Princess Elisabeth Sophie of Saxe-Altenburg
5. Anna Sophie of Saxe-Gotha-Altenburg
22. Augustus, Duke of Saxe-Weissenfels
11. Magdalena Sibylle of Saxe-Weissenfels
23. Anna Maria of Mecklenburg-Schwerin
1. Frederick Charles, Prince of Schwarzburg-Rudolstadt
24. Henry V, Lord Reuss of Untergreiz
12. Henry IV, Count Reuss of Untergreiz
25. Anna Marie of Salm-Neufville
6. Henry XIII, Count Reuss of Untergreiz
26. Wilhelm von Ruppa
13. Anna Dorothea von Ruppa
27. Anna Catherine von Ruppa
3. Countess Sophie Henriette Reuss of Untergreiz
28. Henry Ernest, Count of Stolberg
14. Ernest, Count of Stolberg-Ilsenburg
29. Countess Anna Elisabeth of Stolberg
7. Sophie Elizabeth of Stolberg-Wernigerode
30. Christian Günther II, Count of Schwarzburg-Sondershausen-Arnstadt
15. Sophia Dorothea of Schwarzburg-Arnstadt
31. Sophia Dorothea of Mörsperg and Beffort

== Footnotes ==
Frederick Charles, Prince of Schwarzburg-Rudolstadt House of Schwarzburg Born: (7 June 1736 Died: 13 April 1793
Preceded by Louis Günther II	Prince of Schwarzburg-Rudolstadt; 1790-1793	Succeeded by Louis Frederick II
