= Christine of Baden-Durlach =

German noblewoman

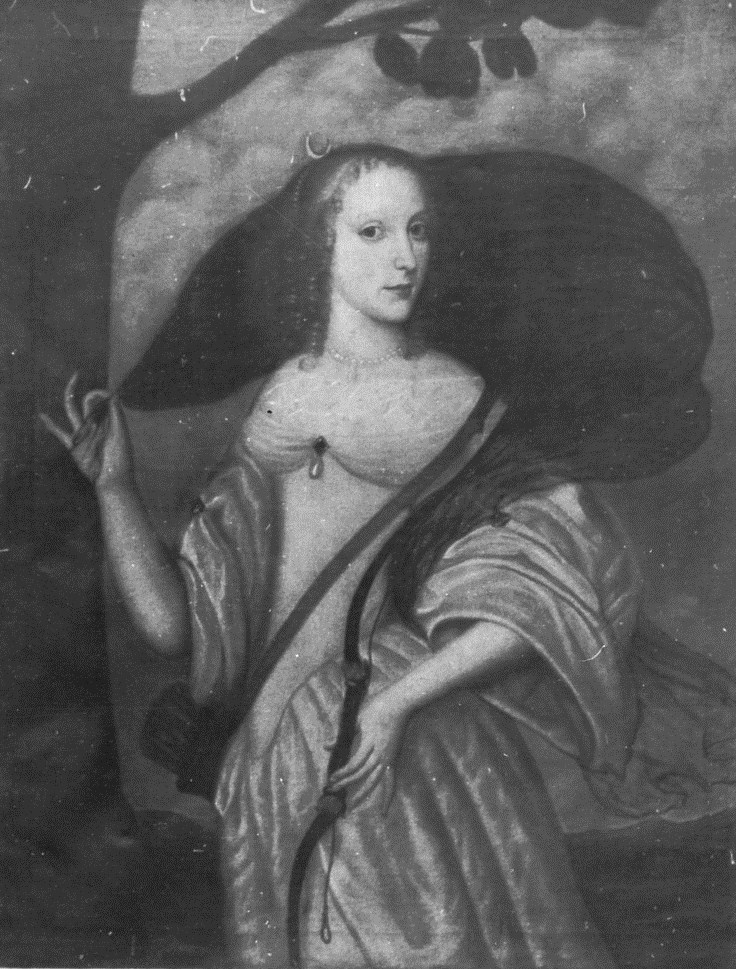

Christine of Baden-Durlach (22 April 1645 – 21 December 1705) was a German noblewoman.

She was a daughter of Frederick VI, Margrave of Baden-Durlach and his wife Christina Magdalena of the Palatinate-Zweibrücken. Her first marriage was to Albert II, Margrave of Brandenburg-Ansbach. He died in 1667, and in 1681 she married for the second time to Frederick I, Duke of Saxe-Gotha-Altenburg, widowed earlier that year. She had no children by either marriage.

Christine of Baden-Durlach House of Baden Born: 22 April 1645 Died: 21 December 1705
German nobility
Vacant Title last held by Sophie Margarete of Oettingen-Oettingen	Margravine of Brandenburg-Ansbach; 6 August 1665 – 22 October 1667	Vacant Title next held by Johanna Elisabeth of Baden-Durlach
Vacant Title last held by Magdalena Sibylle of Saxe-Weissenfels	Duchess consort of Saxe-Gotha-Altenburg; 14 August 1681 – 2 August 1691	Succeeded by Magdalena Augusta of Anhalt-Zerbst
