= Princess Sophia Wilhelmina of Saxe-Coburg-Saalfeld =

Princess Sophia Wilhelmina
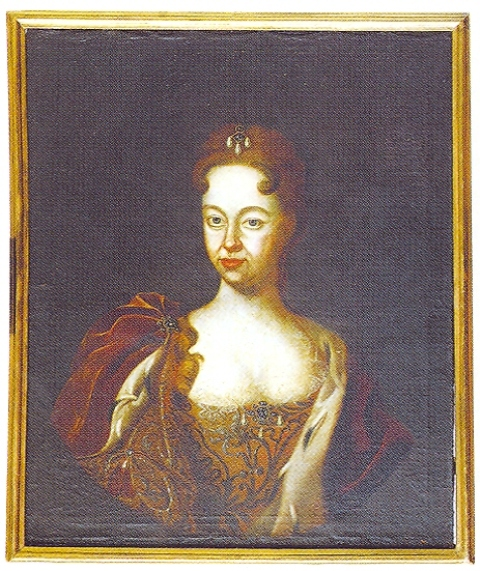
- Sophia Wilhelmina of Saxe-Coburg-Saalfeld, Duchess of Schwarzburg-Rudolstadt

Princess consort of Schwarzburg-Rudolstadt
- Tenure: 8 February 1720 - 4 December 1727
- Born: 9 August 1693; Saalfeld
- Died: 4 December 1727 (aged 34); Rudolstadt
- Spouse: Frederick Anton, Prince of Schwarzburg-Rudolstadt
- Issue: John Frederick, Prince of Schwarzburg-Rudolstadt
- House: Saxe-Coburg-Saalfeld
- Father: John Ernest IV, Duke of Saxe-Coburg-Saalfeld
- Mother: Charlotte Johanna of Waldeck-Wildungen

Princess Sophia Wilhelmina of Saxe-Coburg-Saalfeld (9 August 1693, in Saalfeld – 4 December 1727, in Rudolstadt) was a Princess of Saxe-Coburg-Saalfeld by birth, and Princess of Schwarzburg-Rudolstadt by marriage.

== Life ==
Sophia Wilhelmina was the eldest daughter of John Ernest IV, Duke of Saxe-Coburg-Saalfeld (1658–1729), from his second marriage to Charlotte Johanna of Waldeck-Wildungen (1644–1699), daughter of Josias II, Count of Waldeck-Wildungen. The bond between the two families was further strengthened three years later, when her brother, Francis Josias, married her husband's sister, Anna Sophia. The close bond with the very pious court at Rudolstadt also meant that pietism gained a foothold in Saxe-Coburg-Saalfeld. Sophia Wilhelmina's half-brother, Christian Ernest II, supported this development.

== Marriage and issue ==
On 8 February 1720 in Saalfeld, Sophie Wilhelmine married Frederick Anton, Prince of Schwarzburg-Rudolstadt. The couple had the following children:

- John Frederick, Prince of Schwarzburg-Rudolstadt (1721–1767); married in 1744 Princess Bernardina Christina Sophia of Saxe-Weimar-Eisenach (1724–1757)
- Princess Sophia Wilhelmina of Schwarzburg-Rudolstadt (1723)
- Princess Sophia Albertina of Schwarzburg-Rudolstadt (1724–1799)
