= Louis Günther II of Schwarzburg-Rudolstadt =

Prince of Schwarzburg-Rudolstadt

Louis Günther II, Prince of Schwarzburg-Rudolstadt
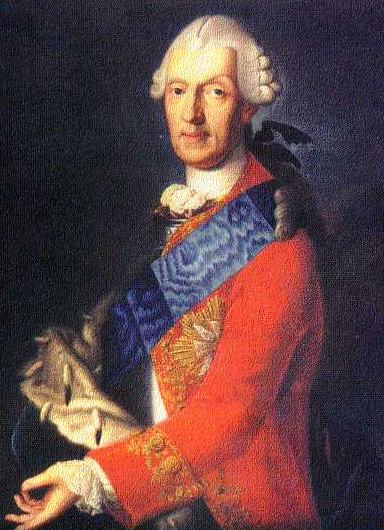
- 18th-century portrait

Prince of Schwarzburg-Rudolstadt
- Reign: 10 July 1767 – 29 August 1790
- Predecessor: John Frederick
- Successor: Frederick Charles
- Born: 22 October 1708; Rudolstadt
- Died: 29 August 1790 (aged 81); Rudolstadt
- Spouse: Sophie Henrietta Reuss-Untergreiz
- Issue: Frederick Charles, Prince of Schwarzburg-Rudolstadt
- House: House of Schwarzburg
- Father: Louis Frederick I, Prince of Schwarzburg-Rudolstadt
- Mother: Anna Sophie of Saxe-Gotha-Altenburg

Louis Günther II of Schwarzburg-Rudolstadt (also known as Louis Günther IV), (22 October 1708 in Rudolstadt – 29 August 1790, Rudolstadt) was the ruling prince of Schwarzburg-Rudolstadt from 1767 until his death.

== Life ==
Louis Günther II of Schwarzburg-Rudolstadt was the youngest son of Prince Louis Frederick I of Schwarzburg-Rudolstadt and his wife Anna Sophie of Saxe-Gotha-Altenburg. Prince Louis Günther grew up as the thirteenth and youngest child, among seven sisters and three brothers in Rudolstadt (two sisters had already died before he was born).

In his youth, Louis Günther traveled to Italy. In this way, the Prince could marvel at the artistic heritage of Italy. He also took a job as a colonel in Milan from 1726 to 1731 as a Colonel Agent in Milan. Between 1722 and 1731, he visited Rudolstadt only twice. His military career was ended by problems with his ear.

In 1767, Louis Günther inherited the principality of Schwarzburg-Rudolstadt at the age of 59. Most government business was transacted by his Chancellor, Christian Ulrich von Ketelholdt, with whom he had a good working relationship. One might say that the Chancellor was de facto regent. The prince had various occupations; among other things, he was very enthusiastic about horses.

In 1784, Louis Günther granted a trade concession to three Jewish families from Dessau, thus creating the bases for the Jewish community in Rudolstadt.

When he was born, Louis Günther II was fourth in the line of succession. By 1726, two of his elder brothers had died and he had moved up to the second place. Between 1734 and 1741, a Baroque palace named Ludwigsburg Castle was built for him below Heidecksburg Castle.

After his nephew, Prince John Frederick died in 1767, he moved from Ludwigsburg Castle to Heidecksburg Castle. After he left, Ludwigburg palace served as a princely art school and it housed the natural history collection owned by Hereditary Prince Frederick Charles and Louis Günther's collection of coins, which he had started in 1738. His mother, who owned a collection of rarities herself, had aroused his passion for collecting. He had been shown the coin collection of his uncle, Duke Frederick II of Saxe-Gotha-Altenburg during a visit to Gotha. This collection, which had been extended in 1712 by purchasing the collection of Prince Anton Günther II was among the most important coin collections in the 18th century and included a separate collection of over 600 medieval bracteates. Louis Günther moved his coin collection to the Heidecksburg Castle and further extended it by purchases. In 1776, he archived his collection. However, his successors had little interest in the collection and sold off some of it. By 1919, 1,710 pieces were left; they are now part of a collection of 5,000 coins still housed in Heidecksburg Castle.

In 1778, Louis Günther II established a court library in the west wing of Heidecksburg Castle, thereby laying the foundation for the Palace Library which today contains approximately 7,000 volumes. In addition to folios Louis Günther II had brought with him from Italy, he also purchased works of art by renowned artists. The scholar Friedrich Karl Gottlob Hirsching points out in his Descriptions of German Libraries worth seeing" of 1786 that The Prince has enriched his library with a tasteful collection of several thousands of engravings, among them some by William Hogarth.

Louis Günther II died on 29 August 1790 and was succeeded as ruling Prince by his son Frederick Charles.

== Marriage and issue ==
Louis Günther II married on 22 October 1733 in Greiz to Countess Sophie Henrietta of Reuss-Untergreiz (1711-1771), daughter of Count Heinrich XIII Reuss zu Untergreiz (1672-1733) and his wife, Countess Sophie Elisabeth of Stolberg-Ilsenburg (1676-1729). They had four children:

- Friederike Sophie (1734-1734)
- Christiane Friederike (1735-1738)
- Frederick Charles (1736-1793), his successor
- Christian Ernst (1739-1739)

== Footnotes ==
Louis Günther II of Schwarzburg-Rudolstadt House of Schwarzburg Born: 22 October 1708 Died: 29 August 1790
Preceded by John Frederick	Prince of Schwarzburg-Rudolstadt; 1767-1790	Succeeded by Frederick Charles
