= Francis Josias, Duke of Saxe-Coburg-Saalfeld =

Francis Josias
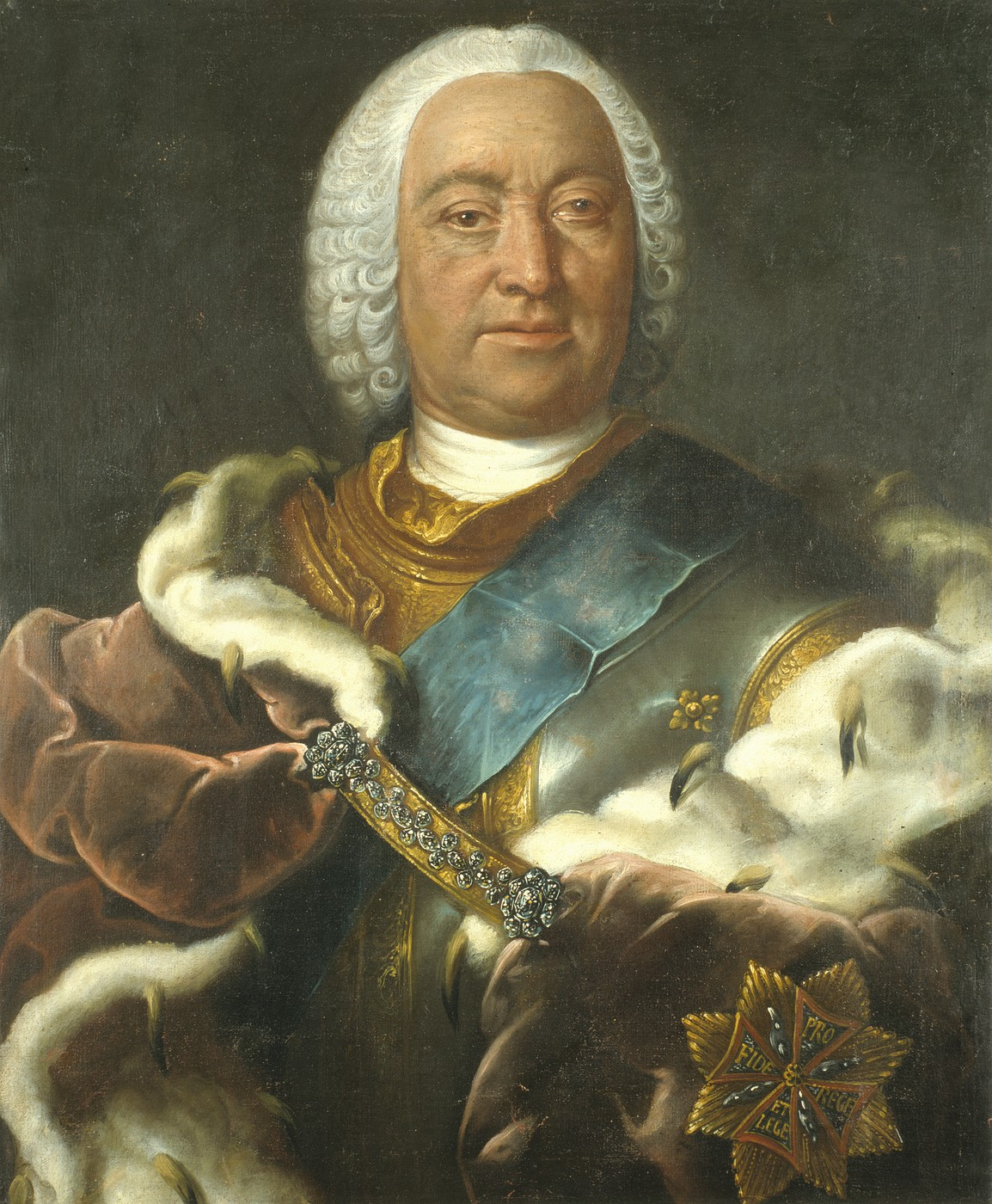
- Portrait of Francis Josias wearing the Polish Order of the White Eagle

Duke of Saxe-Coburg-Saalfeld
- Reign: 4 September 1745 – 16 September 1764
- Predecessor: Christian Ernest II
- Successor: Ernest Frederick
- Born: 25 September 1697; Saalfeld, Saxe-Saalfeld, Holy Roman Empire
- Died: 16 September 1764 (aged 66); Rodach, Saxe-Coburg-Saalfeld, Holy Roman Empire
- Spouse: Anna Sophie of Schwarzburg-Rudolstadt (m. 1723)
- Issue: Ernest Frederick, Duke of Saxe-Coburg-Saalfeld; Prince Johann Wilhelm; Prince Christian Franz; Charlotte Sophie, Duchess Louis of Mecklenburg-Schwerin; Fredericka Caroline, Margravine of Brandenburg-Ansbach; Prince Josias
- House: Saxe-Coburg-Saalfeld
- Father: John Ernest IV, Duke of Saxe-Coburg-Saalfeld
- Mother: Charlotte Johanna of Waldeck-Wildungen
- Religion: Lutheranism

Francis Josias, Duke of Saxe-Coburg-Saalfeld (German: Franz Josias; 25 September 1697 – 16 September 1764) was a duke of Saxe-Coburg-Saalfeld.

== Biography ==
He was the fourth living son of Johann Ernest IV, Duke of Saxe-Coburg-Saalfeld, the third born by his father's second wife Charlotte Johanna of Waldeck-Wildungen.

During his youth, Francis Josias served in the Imperial Army.

The death of his two older brothers Wilhelm Frederick (d. 28 July 1720) and Charles Ernest (d. 30 December 1720) made him the second in line in the succession of the duchy of Saxe-Coburg-Saalfeld, preceded only by his older half-brother, Christian Ernest.

When Christian Ernest married unequally in 1724, Francis Josias claimed the sole inheritance of the duchy. His father's will (1729), however, compelled him to rule jointly with his brother. In 1735, the support of the line of Saxe-Meiningen allowed him to effectively rule over Coburg on his own right, and Christian Ernest's death in 1745 made him the sole Duke. Already in 1733 he proclaimed primogeniture in the duchy, which, however, was confirmed by the Emperor only in 1747. From 1750 to 1755, he was regent of the Duchy of Saxe-Weimar on behalf of Ernest Augustus II Konstantin.

== Issue ==
In Rudolstadt on 2 January 1723 Franz Josias married Princess Anna Sophie of Schwarzburg-Rudolstadt, member of Schwarzburg-Rudolstadt line of the House of Schwarzburg.

Together, they had eight children:

1. Ernest Frederick (b. Saalfeld, 8 March 1724 – d. Coburg, 8 September 1800)
2. Johann Wilhelm (b. Coburg, 11 May 1726 – killed in battle, Hohenfriedberg, 4 June 1745) died aged 19 unmarried with no issue.
3. Anna Sophie (b. Coburg, 3 September 1727 – d. Coburg, 10 November 1728) died in infancy.
4. Christian Franz (b. Coburg, 25 January 1730 – d. Coburg, 18 September 1797) died unmarried and without issue.
5. Charlotte Sophie (b. Coburg, 24 September 1731 – d. Schwerin, 2 August 1810), married on 13 May 1755 to Ludwig of Mecklenburg-Schwerin
6. Fredericka Magdalene (b. Coburg, 21 August 1733 – d. Coburg, 29 March 1734) died in infancy.
7. Frederica Caroline (b. Coburg, 24 June 1735 – d. Schloß Schwaningen, 18 February 1791), married on 22 November 1754 to Karl Alexander, Margrave of Brandenburg-Ansbach
8. Frederick Josias (b. Ehrenburg Palace, Coburg, 26 December 1737 – d. Coburg, 26 February 1815)

== Death ==
Duke Francis Josias died on 16 September 1764 in Bad Rodach, Saxe-Coburg-Saalfeld, Holy Roman Empire. His body was interred, alongside his wife Duchess Anna Sophie, in the Church St Maurice, Coburg, Germany.

== Ancestry ==
Ancestors of Francis Josias, Duke of Saxe-Coburg-Saalfeld

8. Johann II, Duke of Saxe-Weimar
4. Ernest I, Duke of Saxe-Gotha and Altenburg
9. Dorothea Maria of Anhalt
2. John Ernest IV, Duke of Saxe-Coburg-Saalfeld
10. Johann Philipp, Duke of Saxe-Altenburg
5. Elisabeth Sophie of Saxe-Altenburg
11. Elisabeth of Brünswick-Wolfenbüttel
1. Francis Josias, Duke of Saxe-Coburg-Saalfeld
12. Philip VII, Count of Waldeck-Wildungen
6. Josias II, Count of Waldeck-Wildungen
13. Anna Catherine of Sayn-Wittgenstein
3. Charlotte Johanna of Waldeck-Wildungen
14. William, Count of Nassau-Siegen
7. Wilhelmine Christine of Nassau-Siegen
15. Christiane of Erbach

Francis Josias, Duke of Saxe-Coburg-Saalfeld House of Wettin Born: 25 September 1697 Died: 16 September 1764
Regnal titles
Preceded by Christian Ernest	Duke of Saxe-Coburg-Saalfeld; 1745–1764	Succeeded by Ernest Frederick
