= Princess Bernardina Christina Sophia of Saxe-Weimar-Eisenach =

Bernardina Christina Sophia
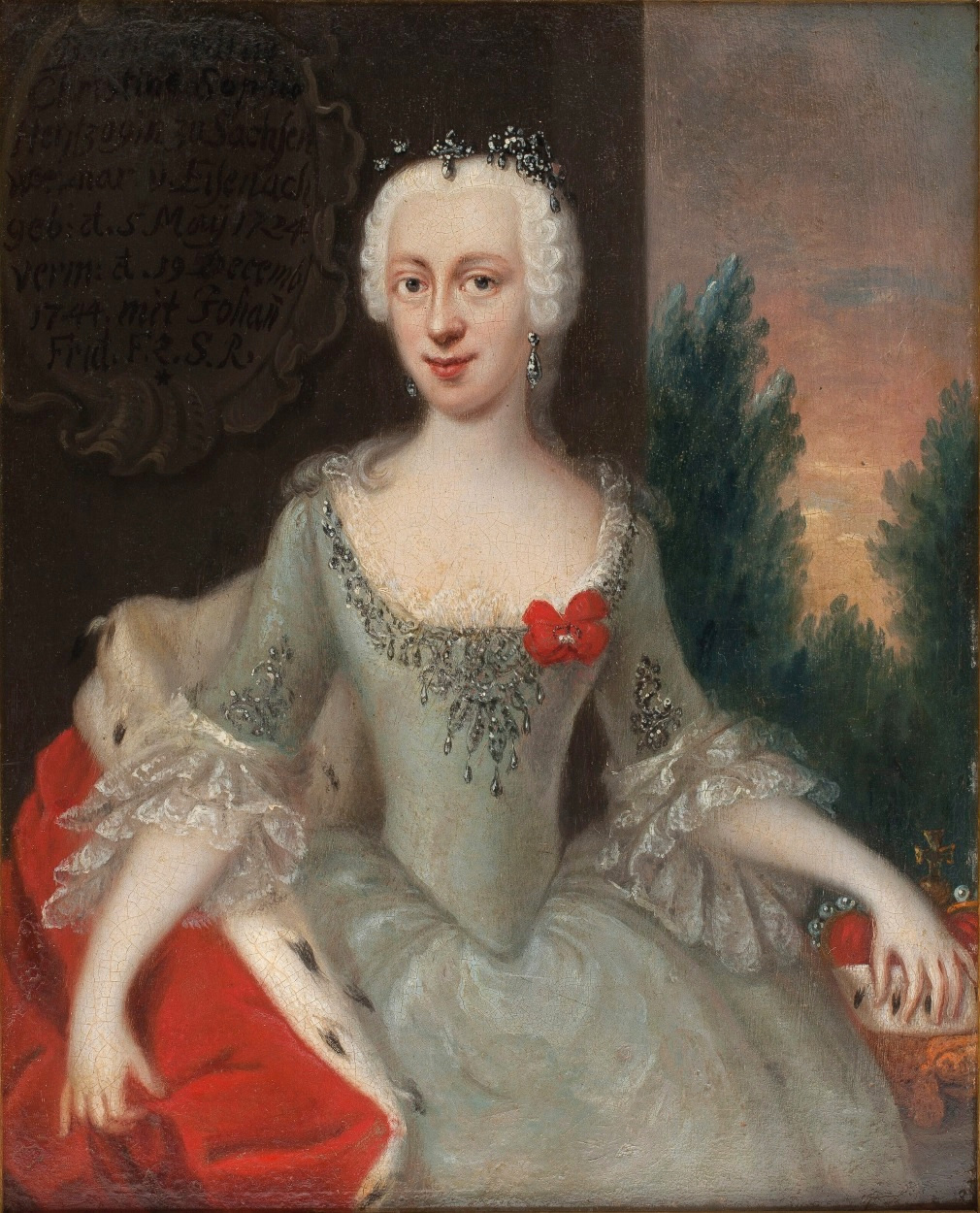

Princess consort of Schwarzburg-Rudolstadt
- Tenure: 19 November 1744 - 5 June 1757
- Born: 5 May 1724; Weimar
- Died: 5 June 1757 (aged 33); Rudolstadt
- Spouse: John Frederick, Prince of Schwarzburg-Rudolstadt (m. 1744)
- Issue: Wilhelmina, Princess of Nassau-Saarbrücken
- House: Wettin
- Father: Ernest Augustus I, Duke of Saxe-Weimar-Eisenach
- Mother: Eleonore Wilhelmine of Anhalt-Köthen

Princess Bernhardina Christiana Sophia of Saxe-Weimar-Eisenach (5 May 1724 in Weimar – 5 June 1757 in Rudolstadt), was a Princess of Saxe-Weimar-Eisenach by birth and Princess of Schwarzburg-Rudolstadt by marriage.

== Life ==
She was a daughter of Ernest Augustus I, Duke of Saxe-Weimar-Eisenach from his first marriage with Princess Eleonore Wilhelmine of Anhalt-Köthen, the daughter of Emmanuel Lebrecht, Prince of Anhalt-Köthen. She married on 19 November 1744 in Eisenach to John Frederick, Prince of Schwarzburg-Rudolstadt.

The princess, who was described as particularly benevolent, acquired the Handwerkerhof in Rudolstadt in 1756 and founded the Bernardina Abbey for noblewomen in this building. Her coat of arms at the entrance to the building are a reminder of her. The building was extended to house six noblewomen. To this end, Bernhardine purchased a neighbouring building and incorporated it into the abbey. She personally wrote the constitution of the abbey.

She did not live to see the inauguration of the abbey in 1757, because she died at age 33. She was deeply mourned by her husband, who never remarried.

Paintings of Berhardina and her husband by Johann Ernst Heinsius are on display in the green room of Heidecksburg Castle.

== Issue ==
From her marriage Bernhardina Christiana Sophia had the following children:

- Princess Frederika of Schwarzburg-Rudolstadt (1745-1778); married in 1763 Frederick Charles, Prince of Schwarzburg-Rudolstadt (1736-1793)
- Daughter (1746)
- Son (1747)
- Princess Sophia Ernestina of Schwarzburg-Rudolstadt (1749-1754)
- Princess Wilhelmina of Schwarzburg-Rudolstadt (1751-1780); married in 1766 Louis, Prince of Nassau-Saarbrücken (1745-1794)
- Princess Henrietta Charlotte of Schwarzburg-Rudolstadt (1752-1756)
