= Frederick Anton, Prince of Schwarzburg-Rudolstadt =

Prince of Schwarzburg-Rudolstadt

Frederick Anton
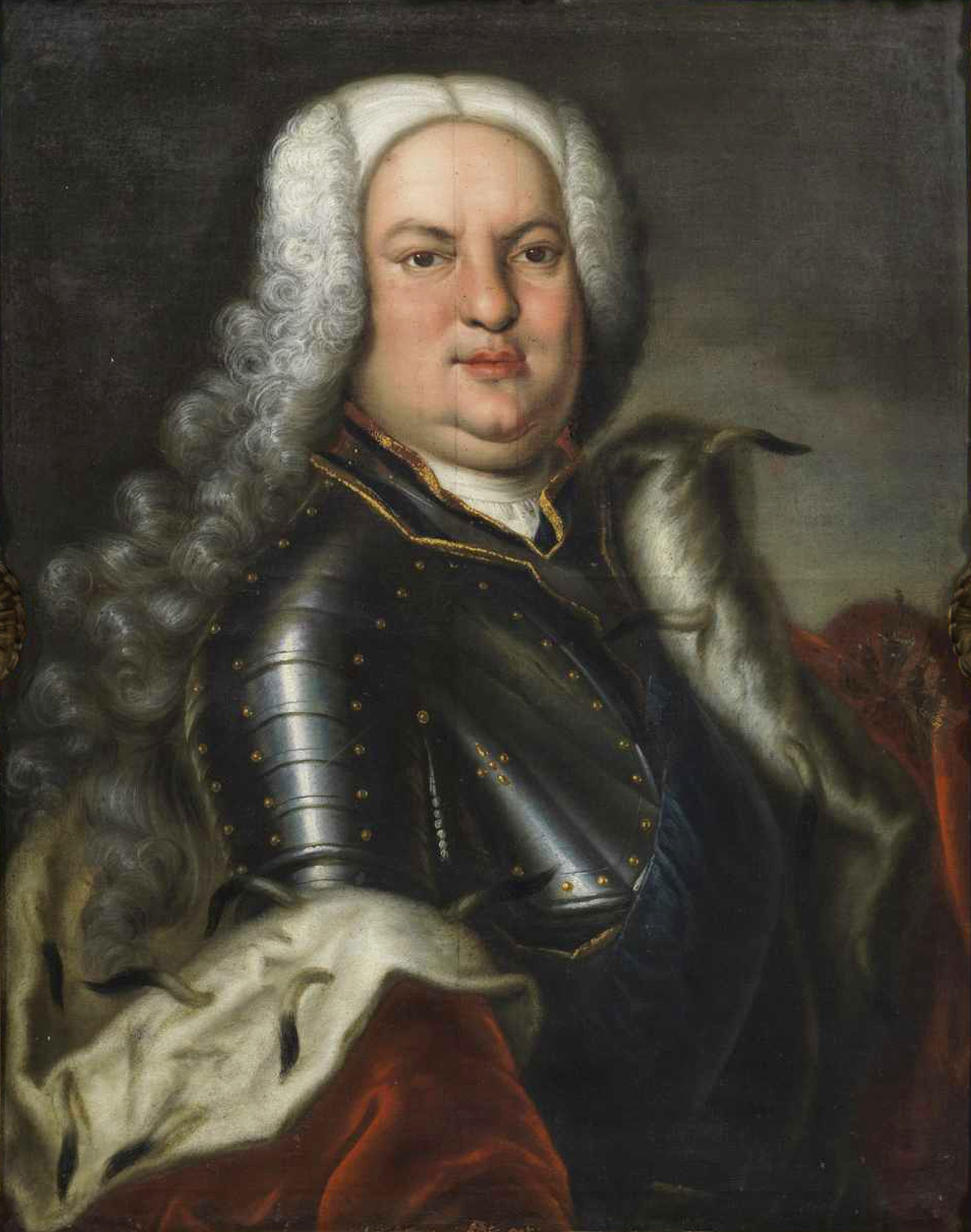
- Portrait, c. 1740

Prince of Schwarzburg-Rudolstadt
- Reign: 24 June 1718 – 1 September 1744
- Predecessor: Louis Frederick I
- Successor: John Frederick
- Born: 14 August 1692; Rudolstadt
- Died: 1 September 1744 (aged 52); Rudolstadt
- Spouse: Sophia Wilhelmina of Saxe-Coburg-Saalfeld; Sophia Christina of East Frisia
- Issue: John Frederick, Prince of Schwarzburg-Rudolstadt
- House: House of Schwarzburg
- Father: Louis Frederick I, Prince of Schwarzburg-Rudolstadt
- Mother: Anna Sophie of Saxe-Gotha-Altenburg

Frederick Anton of Schwarzburg-Rudolstadt (14 August 1692 in Rudolstadt – 1 September 1744 in Rudolstadt) was the ruling Prince of Schwarzburg-Rudolstadt from 1718 until his death.

== Life ==
He was the eldest son of Prince Louis Frederick I of Schwarzburg-Rudolstadt and his wife Anna Sophie of Saxe-Gotha-Altenburg. He had three brothers, along with nine sisters, but in 1713 primogeniture was introduced in the principalities of Schwarzburg, and therefore he became the sole ruling Prince of Rudolstadt in 1718.

His education was organized primarily by his grandparents. Frederick Anton was encouraged to study religion and various sciences. He was particularly interested in poetry and wrote some poems himself.

Between 1716 and 1731, the country was in the grips of the Balisius Unrest, named after the lawyer Johann Georg Balisius. The government tried to increase the tax burden, leading to unrest in 1716. The people tried every legal means available to fight the increase and demanded a reduction instead. In the end, the government prevailed, however, the risk of insurgency remained.

The Prince hardly dealt with the business of government. Instead his Chancellor, Georg Ulrich of Beulwitz was solely responsible for government policy. This was well known to his subjects, who considered him unfit to rule.

In 1727, he granted two Jewish families permission to settle in Immenrode (today part of Sondershausen). Between 1727 and 1737, nine more Jewish families were granted the same privilege. These families developed into the largest Jewish community in the Principality of Schwarzburg-Rudolstadt in the 18th and 19th centuries.

In 1732, some 2000 refugees from Salzburg arrived in Rudolstadt. They were Protestants and had been expelled from Salzburg when Salzburg began enforcing Catholicism in 1731. They were welcomed with ringing of church bells and a church service in the St. Andreas church in Rudolstadt. Most of them settled in Uhlstedt. Frederick Anton accepted these refugees in response to a written request from King Frederick William I of Prussia who had invited the Protestants from Salzburg to Prussia with "emirgration patent" of 1731 and his "invitation patent" of 1732. When many Protestants arrived in Prussia, Frederick William wrote to the princes of neighbouring principalities, asking them to house and feed some of the refugees. One gets a better idea of the scale of this influx if one realises that the refugees arrived in groups of 1000 at a time when Rudolstadt had only around 540 inhabitants.

Frederick Anton had to cope with a number of financial setbacks, which he found hard to do. His brother William Louis was always in debt, and Frederick Anton had to bail him out more than once. In 1726, fire broke out in the ancestral Schwarzburg Castle. In 1735, Heidecksburg Castle burned down to the ground. In 1737, Frederick Anton began construction of a new Great Hall on the site of Heidecksburg Castle. In 1741, a bust of the prince was installed over the main gate of the courtyard. Construction was completed in November 1744.

Frederick Anton died on 1 September 1744, two months before the reconstruction of the Heidecksburg was completed.

== Marriage and issue ==
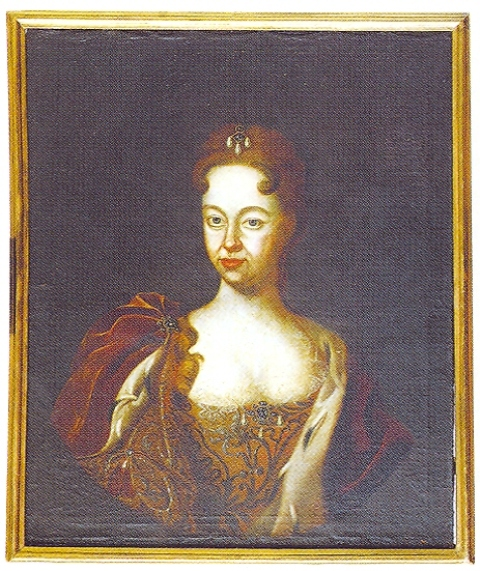
Sophia Wilhelmina of Saxe-Coburg-Saalfeld

On 8 February 1720 in Saalfeld, Frederick Anton married Princess Sophia Wilhelmina of Saxe-Coburg-Saalfeld (1690–1727). They had three children:

- John Frederick, Prince of Schwarzburg-Rudolstadt (1721–1767); his successor, married in 1744 Princess Bernardina Christina Sophia of Saxe-Weimar-Eisenach (1724–1757)
- Princess Sophia Wilhelmina of Schwarzburg-Rudolstadt (1723–1723)
- Princess Sophia Albertina of Schwarzburg-Rudolstadt (1724–1799)

On 6 January 1729, Frederick Anton remarried to Princess Sophia Christina (1688–1750), a daughter of Prince Christian Eberhard of East Frisia. This marriage remained childless.

== See also ==
- House of Schwarzburg
- Schwarzburg-Rudolstadt

== Footnotes ==
Frederick Anton, Prince of Schwarzburg-Rudolstadt House of Schwarzburg Born: 14 August 1692 Died: 1 September 1744
Preceded by Louis Frederick I	Prince of Schwarzburg-Rudolstadt; 1718-1744	Succeeded by John Frederick
