= Countess Charlotte Johanna of Waldeck-Wildungen =

Charlotte Johanna of Waldeck-Wildungen
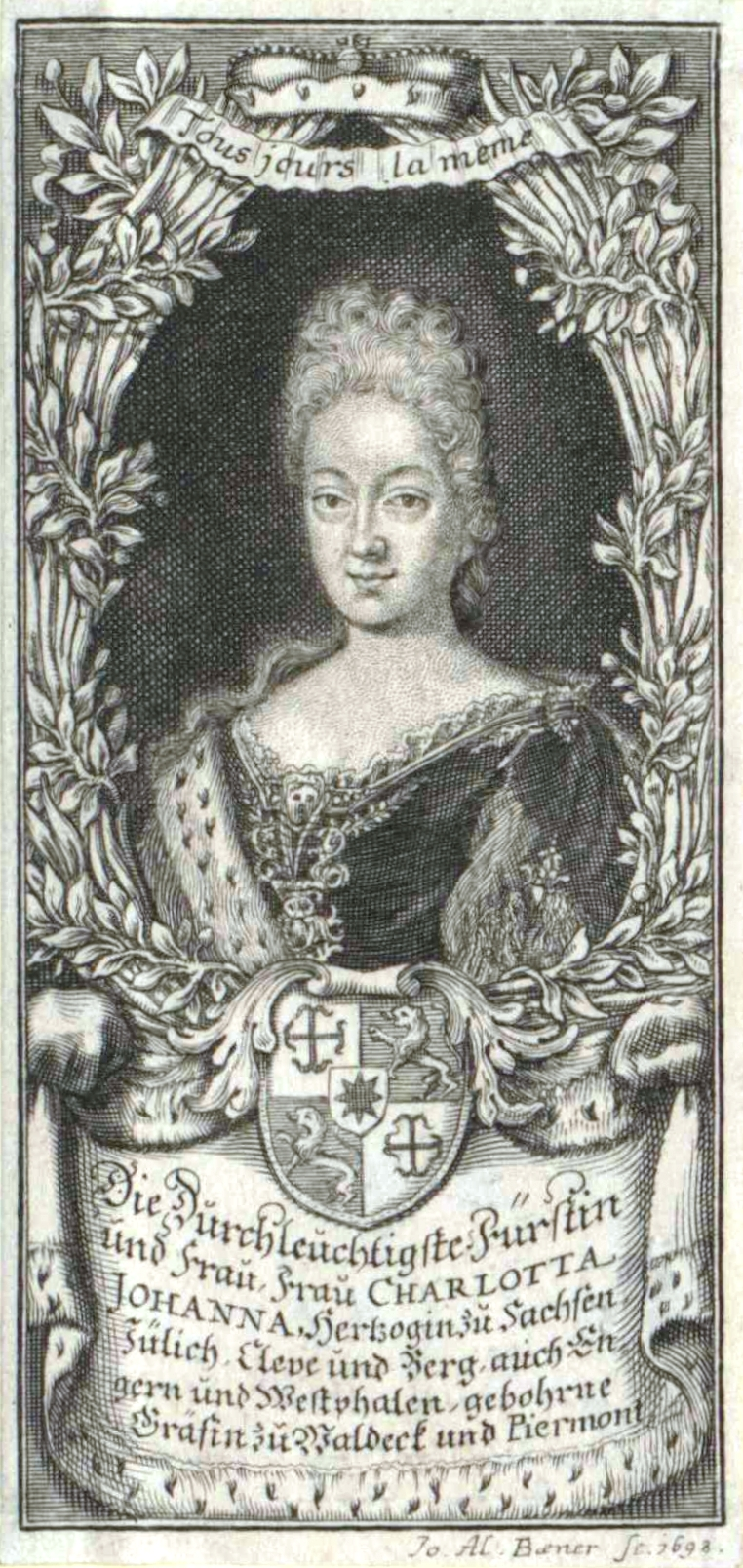

Duchess of Saxe-Coburg-Saalfeld
- Tenure: 2 December 1690 – 1 February 1699
- Born: 13 December 1664; Arolsen
- Died: 1 February 1699 (aged 34); Hildburghausen
- Spouse: John Ernest IV, Duke of Saxe-Coburg-Saalfeld
- Issue: Sophia Wilhelmina, Princess of Schwarzburg-Rudolstadt; Francis Josias, Duke of Saxe-Coburg-Saalfeld
- House: Waldeck
- Father: Josias II, Count of Waldeck-Wildungen
- Mother: Wilhelmine Christine of Nassau-Siegen

Charlotte Johanna of Waldeck-Wildungen (13 December 1664 in Arolsen – 1 February 1699 in Hildburghausen) was a daughter of Count Josias II of Waldeck-Wildungen and his wife, Wilhelmine Christine, a daughter of William of Nassau-Siegen.

== Marriage and issue ==
She married on 2 December 1690 in Maastricht to John Ernest IV, Duke of Saxe-Coburg-Saalfeld, the son of Ernst I, Duke of Saxe-Coburg-Altenburg. She was his second wife. She had eight children:

1. William Frederick (16 August 1691 in Arolsen – 28 July 1720 in Saalfeld)
2. Charles Ernest (12 September 1692 in Saalfeld – 30 December 1720 in Cremona)
3. Sophia Wilhelmina (9 August 1693 in Saalefld – 4 December 1727 in Rudolstadt), married on 8 February 1720 to Frederick Anton, Prince of Schwarzburg-Rudolstadt
4. Henriette Albertine (8 July 1694 in Saalfeld – 1 April 1695 in Saalfeld)
5. Louise Emilie (24 August 1695 in Saalfeld – 21 August 1713 in Coburg)
6. Charlotte (30 October 1696 in Saalfeld – 2 November 1696 in Saalfeld)
7. Francis Josias, Duke of Saxe-Coburg-Saalfeld (25 September 1697 in Saalefeld – 16 September 1764 in Rodach)
8. Henriette Albertine (20 November 1698 in Saalfeld – 5 February 1728 in Coburg)

She died in 1699 at the home of her brother-in-law Ernest, Duke of Saxe-Hildburghausen.
