= Magdalena Sibylla of Saxe-Weissenfels =

German noblewoman

Magdalena Sibylle
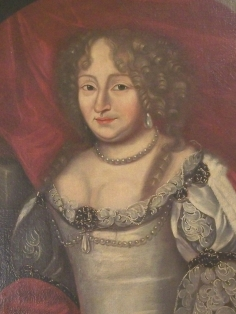

Duchess consort of Saxe-Gotha-Altenburg
- Tenure: 26 March 1675 – 7 January 1681
- Born: 2 September 1648
- Died: 7 January 1681 (aged 32)
- Spouse: Friedrich I, Duke of Saxe-Gotha-Altenburg (m. 1669)
- Issue: Anna Sophie, Princess of Schwarzburg-Rudolstadt; Princess Magdalene Sibylle; Dorothea Marie, Duchess of Saxe-Meiningen; Fredericka, Princess of Anhalt-Zerbst; Frederick II; Prince Johann Wilhelm; Princess Elisabeth; Johanna, Duchess of Mecklenburg-Strelitz
- House: House of Saxe-Weissenfels; House of Saxe-Gotha-Altenburg
- Father: August, Duke of Saxe-Weissenfels
- Mother: Anna Maria of Mecklenburg-Schwerin

Magdalena Sibylle, Duchess of Saxe-Weissenfels (2 September 1648 – 7 January 1681) was a German noblewoman.

She was a daughter of August, Duke of Saxe-Weissenfels, and Anna Maria of Mecklenburg-Schwerin. Her paternal grandparents were John George I, Elector of Saxony, and Magdalene Sibylle of Prussia.

On 14 November 1669, she married Duke Friedrich I of Saxe-Gotha-Altenburg. They had eight children:

1. Anna Sophie (b. Gotha, 22 December 1670 – d. Rudolstadt, 28 December 1728), married on 15 October 1691 to Louis Frederick I, Prince of Schwarzburg-Rudolstadt.
2. Magdalene Sibylle (b. Gotha, 30 September 1671 – d. Altenburg, 2 March 1673).
3. Dorothea Marie (b. Gotha, 22 January 1674 – d. Meiningen, 18 April 1713), married on 19 September 1704 to Ernst Ludwig I, Duke of Saxe-Meiningen.
4. Fredericka (b. Gotha, 24 March 1675 – d. Karlsbad, 28 May 1709), married on 25 May 1702 to Johann August, Prince of Anhalt-Zerbst.
5. Frederick II, Duke of Saxe-Gotha-Altenburg (b. Gotha, 28 July 1676 – d. Altenburg, 23 March 1732).
6. Johann Wilhelm (b. Gotha, 4 October 1677 – killed in battle, Toulon, 15 August 1707), General Imperial.
7. Elisabeth (b. Gotha, 7 February 1679 – d. of smallpox, Gotha, 22 June 1680).
8. Johanna (b. Gotha, 1 October 1680 – d. Strelitz, 9 July 1704), married on 20 June 1702 to Adolf Frederick II, Duke of Mecklenburg-Strelitz.

Magdalena Sibylla of Saxe-Weissenfels House of Saxe-Weissenfels Cadet branch of the House of Wettin Born: 2 September 1648 Died: January 1681
German royalty
Preceded by Elisabeth Sophie of Saxe-Altenburg as Duchess of Saxe-Gotha and Altenburg	Duchess consort of Saxe-Gotha-Altenburg; 26 March 1675 – 7 January 1681	Vacant Title next held by Christine of Baden-Durlach
