= Emilie Juliane of Barby-Mühlingen =

German noblewoman and hymn author

Countess Emilie Juliane of Barby-Mühlingen
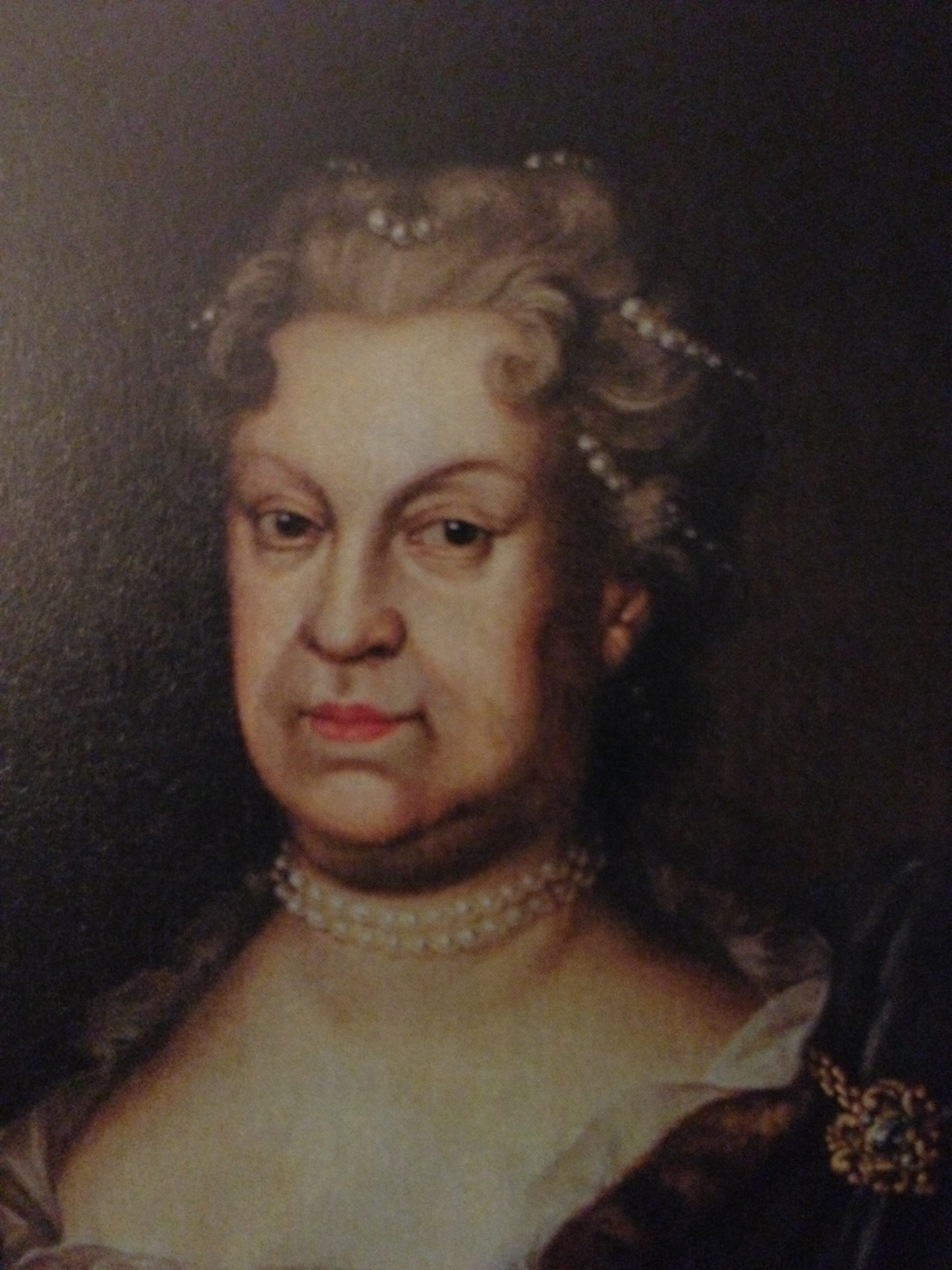
- Emilie Juliane of Barby-Mühlingen
- Born: 19 August 1637; Rudolstadt, Thuringia, Germany
- Died: 3 December 1706 (aged 69); Rudolstadt, Thuringia, Germany
- Noble family: House of Arnstein
- Spouse: Albert Anton, Prince of Schwarzburg-Rudolstadt
- Issue: Louis Frederick I, Prince of Schwarzburg-Rudolstadt
- Father: Albert Frederick I of Barby-Mühlingen
- Mother: Sophia Ursula of Oldenburg-Delmenhorst

Emilie (Ämilie, Aemilie) Juliane (19 August 1637 – 3 December 1706) was a German countess and hymn writer.

== Biography ==
Emilie Juliane was a daughter of Count Albert Frederick I of Barby-Mühlingen and his wife, Countess Sophia Ursula of Oldenburg-Delmenhorst. During the Thirty Years' War, her father and his family were compelled to seek refuge in the castle of Heidecksburg in Rudolstadt after being persecuted for their Lutheran Protestant faith. It belonged to his uncle, Count Louis Günther I of Schwarzburg-Rudolstadt, and Emilie was born there.

After the death of her father (in 1641) and mother (in 1642), she was adopted by her aunt Countess Emilie of Oldenburg, who was also her godmother and had become the wife of Count Louis Günther. Emilie Juliane was educated at Rudolstadt with her cousins under the care of Ahasuerus Fritsch and other teachers. She received a good education in religion, Latin, history, among other sciences. She is regarded as a forerunner of pietism.

On 7 July 1665, she was married to her cousin, Count Albert Anton II of Schwarzburg-Rudolstadt. She was the most productive of German female hymn-writers, almost 600 hymns being attributed to her. Her hymns, such as "Wer weiß, wie nahe mir mein Ende", are full of a deep love for her Saviour. She published Geistliche Lieder, etc., Rudolstadt, 1683; Kuhlwasser in grosser Hitze des Creutzes, Rudolstadt, 1685; Tägliches Morgen- Mittags- und Abendopfer, Rudolstadt, 1685.

Her hymns ""Bis hierher hat mich Gott gebracht (EG 329) and "Wer weiß, wie nahe mir mein Ende" (EG 530) are contained in the Protestant hymnal Evangelisches Gesangbuch.
