= Louis Frederick I of Schwarzburg-Rudolstadt =

Prince of Schwarzburg-Rudolstadt (1667–1718)

Louis Frederick I
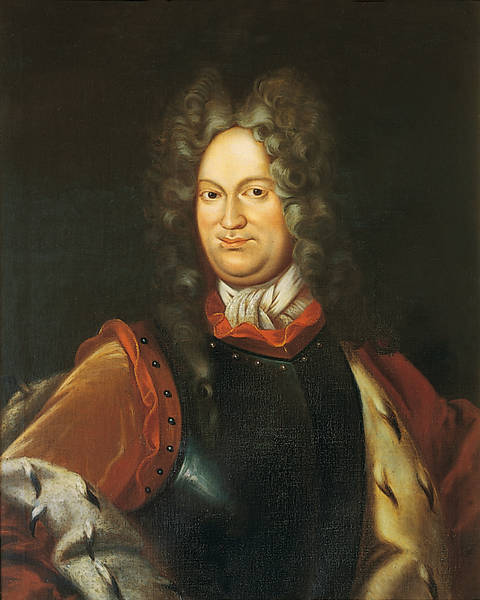
- Early 18th-century portrait

Prince of Schwarzburg-Rudolstadt
- Reign: 15 December 1710 – 24 June 1718
- Predecessor: Albert Anton
- Successor: Frederick Anton
- Born: 25 October 1667; Rudolstadt
- Died: 24 June 1718 (aged 50); Rudolstadt
- Spouse: Anna Sophie of Saxe-Gotha-Altenburg
- Issue: Frederick Anton; Princess Anna Sophie of Schwarzburg-Rudolstadt; Louis Günther II
- House: Schwarzburg
- Father: Albert Anton, Prince of Schwarzburg-Rudolstadt
- Mother: Countess Emilie Juliane of Barby-Mühlingen

Louis Frederick I of Schwarzburg-Rudolstadt (25 October 1667 in Rudolstadt – 24 June 1718, in Rudolstadt) was the ruling prince of Schwarzburg-Rudolstadt, Count of Hohenstein, Lord of Rudolstadt, Blankenburg and Sondershausen from 1710 until his death.

== Life ==
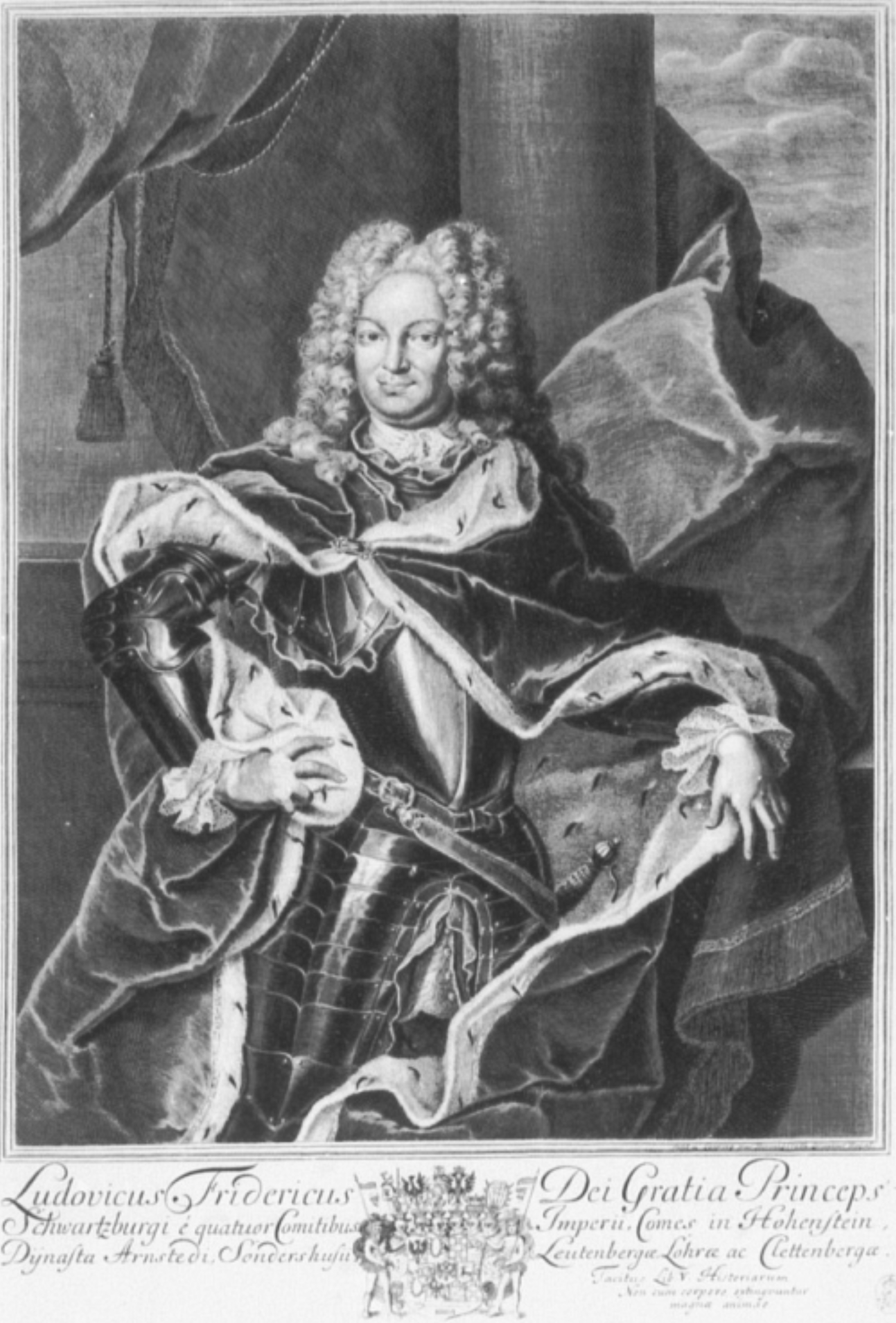
Engraving of Louis Frederick by Martin Bernigeroth, c. 1700–1718

Louis Frederick was the son of Albert Anton of Schwarzburg-Rudolstadt and his wife, the poet and pietist, Countess Emilie Juliane of Barby-Mühlingen.

Between May 1687 and October 1688, he made a Grand Tour, accompanied by his Hofmeister Johann von Asseburg. He was received at the Palace of Versailles by King Louis XIV and in Vienna by Emperor Leopold I. He was also received by Duke Frederick I of Saxe-Gotha-Altenburg, whose daughter Anna Sophie he would marry on 15 October 1691 at Friedenstein Castle in Gotha. The pair would have 15 children.

His father was raised to Imperial Prince in 1697 and again in 1710. In 1710, his father had accepted the elevation, but not made it public. After his father died in 1710, Louis Frederick I inherited Schwarzburg-Rudolstadt and published the promotion. From 15 April 1711, he styled himself Prince of Schwarzburg-Rudolstadt. At the time, the principality had around 45000 inhabitants. The elevation strengthened the position of the House of Schwarzburg against the House of Wettin and ensured its survival into modern times. Between 1697 and 1719, they added an Imperial Hall to the southern side of their Schwarzburg Castle, underlining the importance the princes attached to their elevation.

Louis Frederick I assisted his father in administrating the principality even before 1710. After he inherited the throne, he reformed the administration on an absolutist basis. George Ulrich von Beulwitz was the highest civil servant in the principality. Inspired by the Sun King, Louis Frederick I toyed with the idea to move his residence to Schwarzburg. However, his financial position made this impossible.

Louis Frederick I took his own life on 24 June 1718 and was succeeded by his eldest son, Frederick Anton.

== Marriage and issue ==
On 15 October 1691 at Friedenstein Castle in Gotha, Louis Frederick I married Princess Anna Sophie of Saxe-Gotha-Altenburg, the daughter of Duke Frederick I of Saxe-Gotha-Altenburg. They had 13 children:

- Frederick Anton (1692-1744), Prince of Schwarzburg-Rudolstadt, married:
  1. Princess Sophia Wilhelmina of Saxe-Coburg-Saalfeld (1690-1727)
  2. Princess Christina Sophia of Ostfriesland (1688-1750)
- Amalie Magdalene (1693-1693)
- Sophie Louise (1693-1776)
- Sophie Juliane (1694-1776), a nun at Gandersheim Abbey
- William Louis (1696-1757), married in 1726 morganatically to Caroline Henriette Gebauer (1706-1794), who was made Baroness of Brockenburg in 1727
- Christine Dorothea (1697-1698)
- Albert Anton (1698-1720)
- Emilie Juliane (1699-1774)
- Anna Sophie (1700-1780), married in 1723 to Duke Francis Josias of Saxe-Coburg-Saalfeld (1697-1764)
- Sophia Dorothea (1706-1737)
- Friederike Louise (1706-1787)
- Magdalena Sibylle (1707-1795), a nun at Gandersheim Abbey
- Louis Günther II (1708-1790), Prince of Schwarzburg-Rudolstadt, married in 1733 to Countess Sophie Henriette of Reuss-Untergreiz (1711-1771)

Louis Frederick I of Schwarzburg-Rudolstadt House of Schwarzburg Born: 25 October 1667 Died: 24 June 1718
Preceded by Albert Anton	Prince of Schwarzburg-Rudolstadt; 1710-1718	Succeeded by Frederick Anton
