= Princess Anna Sophie of Saxe-Gotha-Altenburg =

Anna Sophie of Saxe-Gotha-Altenburg
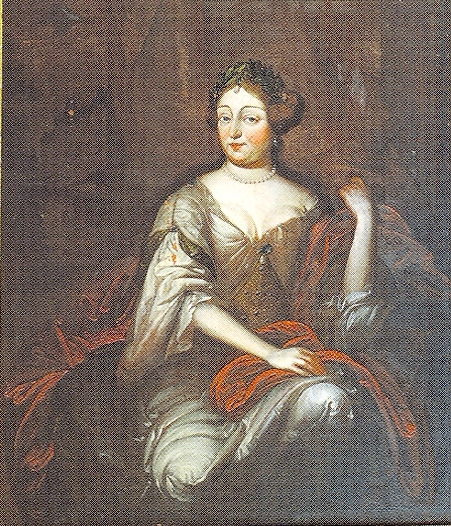

Princess consort of Schwarzburg-Rudolstadt
- Tenure: 15 December 1710 - 24 June 1718
- Born: 22 December 1670
- Died: 28 December 1728 (aged 58)
- Spouse: Louis Frederick I, Prince of Schwarzburg-Rudolstadt
- Issue: Frederick Anton; Princess Amalie Magdalene; Sophie Louise; Sophie Juliane; William Louis; Christiane Dorothea; Albert Anton; Emilie Juliane; Anna Sophie; Dorothea Sofie; Louise Friederike; Magdalene Sibylle; Louis Günther II
- House: Saxe-Gotha-Altenburg
- Father: Frederick I, Duke of Saxe-Gotha-Altenburg
- Mother: Magdalena Sybille of Saxe-Weissenfels

Duchess Anna Sophie of Saxe-Gotha-Altenburg (22 December 1670 – 28 December 1728) was a princess of Saxe-Gotha-Altenburg and Duchess in Saxony by birth, and by marriage a Princess of Schwarzburg-Rudolstadt.

== Ancestry ==
Born on 22 December 1670, she was the daughter of Frederick I, Duke of Saxe-Gotha-Altenburg and Magdalena Sibylle, Duchess of Saxe-Weissenfels.

Her father was a fourth-generation descendant of John Frederick, Elector of Saxony in direct male line. He was also a fourth-generation descendant of his wife Sybille of Cleves who was the daughter of John III, Duke of Cleves, and older sister of both Anne of Cleves and Wilhelm, Duke of Jülich-Cleves-Berg.

The Elector was the father of John William, Duke of Saxe-Weimar. He married Dorothea Susanne of Simmern, daughter of Frederick III, Elector Palatine.

They were the parents of John II, Duke of Saxe-Weimar. He married Dorothea Maria of Anhalt, a granddaughter of Christoph, Duke of Württemberg and great-granddaughter of Ulrich, Duke of Württemberg.

John and Dorothea Maria were the parents of Ernst I, Duke of Saxe-Coburg. He married his cousin Elisabeth Sophie of Saxe-Altenburg. As a result, their son Frederick I inherited both Duchies as the Duke of Saxe-Gotha-Altenburg in 1675.

== Marriage ==
She married Louis Frederick I, Prince of Schwarzburg-Rudolstadt (15 October 1667- 24 June 1718). They had 13 children:

- Frederick Anton
- Amalie Magdalene
- Sophie Louise
- Sophie Juliane
- William Louis
- Christiane Dorothea
- Albert Anton
- Emilie Juliane
- Anna Sophie
- Dorothea Sophie
- Louise Friederike
- Magdalene Sibylle
- Louis Günther II

Via her eponymous daughter, Anna Sophie was an ancestor of both Queen Victoria and Prince Albert and their cousins Carlota of Mexico and Leopold II of Belgium.
