= Frederick I of Saxe-Gotha-Altenburg =

Frederick I
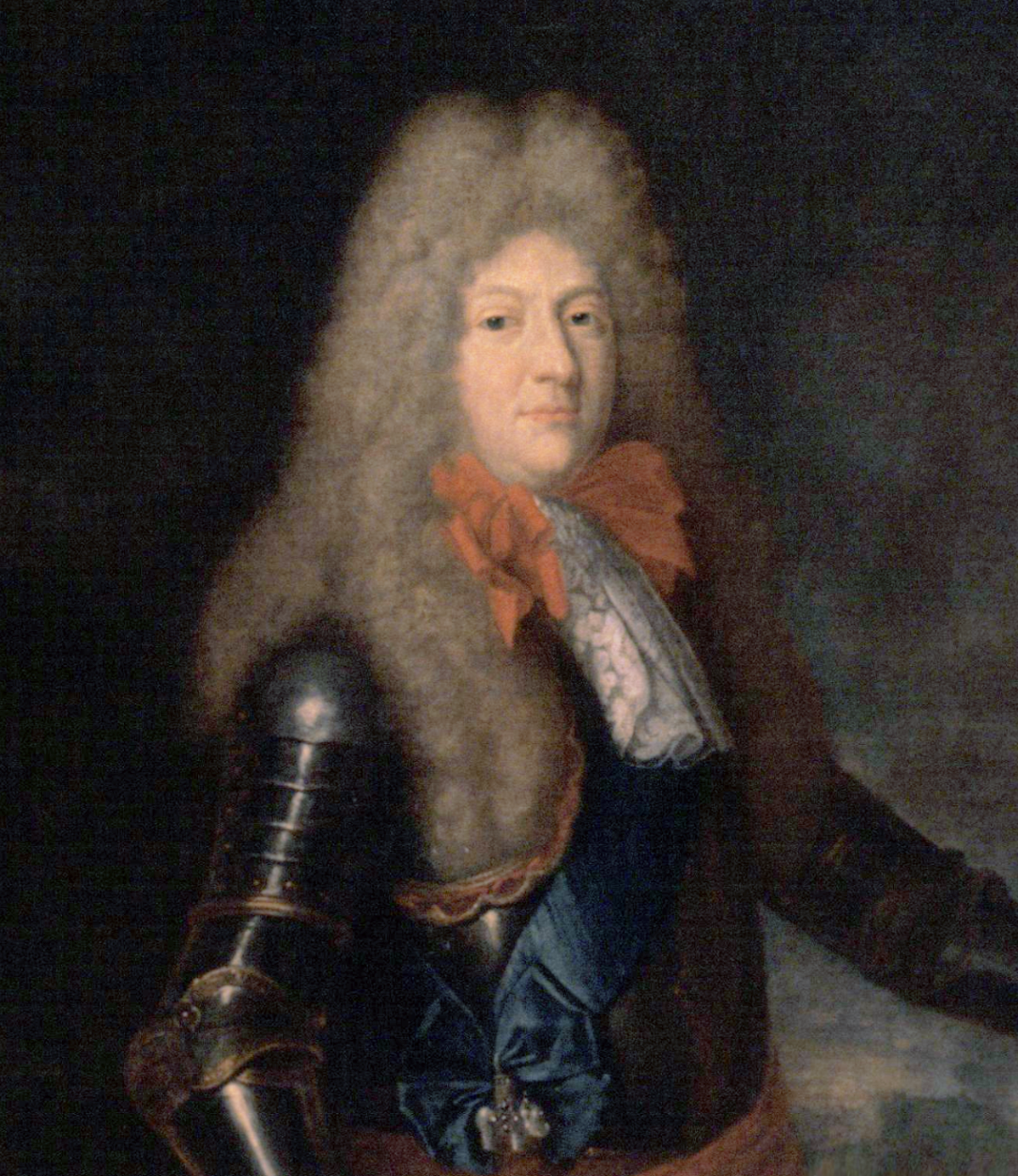

Duke of Saxe-Gotha-Altenburg
- Reign: 26 March 1675 – 2 August 1691
- Predecessor: New creation
- Successor: Frederick II
- Born: 15 July 1646; Gotha, Duchy of Saxe-Gotha
- Died: 2 August 1691 (aged 45); Friedrichswerth
- Spouse: Magdalena Sibylle of Saxe-Weissenfels (m. 1669; died 1681) Christine of Baden-Durlach (m. 1681)
- Issue: Anna Sophie, Princess of Schwarzburg-Rudolstadt; Dorothea Marie, Duchess of Saxe-Meiningen; Frederick II; Johanna, Duchess of Mecklenburg-Strelitz
- House: Saxe-Gotha-Altenburg
- Father: Ernst I, Duke of Saxe-Coburg-Altenburg
- Mother: Elisabeth Sophie of Saxe-Altenburg
- Religion: Lutheran

Frederick I, Duke of Saxe-Gotha-Altenburg (German: Friedrich I. von Sachsen-Gotha-Altenburg; 15 July 1646 – 2 August 1691), was a territorial ruler in Thuringia from the Ernestine branch of the House of Wettin. He continued the line of Saxe-Gotha founded by Ernest I, his father, which, to distinguish it from the older Gotha line, is generally referred to as Saxe-Gotha-Altenburg.

== Life ==
=== Early life and regency ===
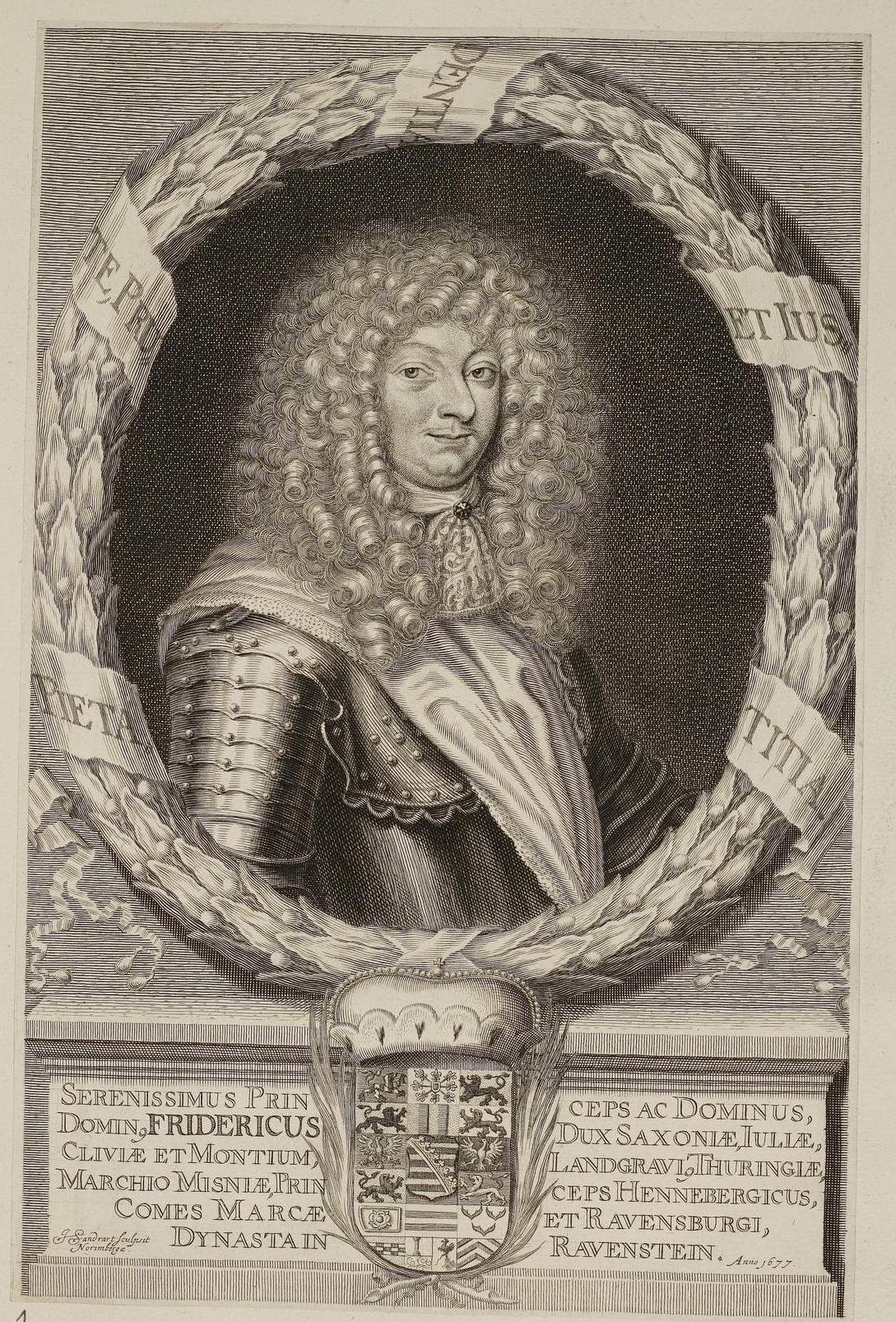
Engraving of Frederick by Jacob von Sandrart, 1677

When Ernst inherited the duchy of Saxe-Altenburg (1672), he made Frederick the regent of that duchy. In 1674 Ernst, who was already ill, made Frederick the regent of his entire lands.

After the death of his father (1675) Frederick assumed the throne of both duchies. However, on the basis of his family's house law, he had to allow his six younger brothers to take part in the government. At first, they agreed to a common household of all seven brothers in the Schloss Friedenstein, though this arrangement endured only until 1676.

=== Territorial division ===
Afterwards, negotiations began for the division of the paternal inheritance. This was finally accomplished on 24 February 1680; Frederick kept Gotha, Tenneberg, Wachsenburg, Ichtershausen, Georgenthal, Schwarzwald, Reinhardsbrunn, Volkenrode, Oberkranichfeld, Orlamünde, Altenburg and Tonna. These towns virtually formed the old duchy of Saxe-Gotha-Altenburg. They consisted of three large and coherent areas around Gotha, Kahla and Altenburg, as well as six smaller enclaves.

=== Government, culture and legacy ===
Frederick continued the work of his father. In order to prevent future disputes between his descendants, he established primogeniture for his house in 1685 (with Imperial assent granted in 1688). Around 1680 he established himself in the Lustschloss Friedrichswerth, near the village of Erffa, approximately 20 km of Gotha, which was renamed in his honour Friedrichswerth. On the occasion of the opening of his new palace, on 19 July 1689 he founded the Order of the German Probity ("Orden der deutschen Redlichkeit"). In 1678 he had been appointed member of the Danish Order of the Elephant.

In 1683 Frederick created the (still in existence today) Theatre of Gotha (Gothaer Schloßtheater). He was also an eager diary writer; these diaries became one of the most important sources of his time. Frederick took part in the Great Turkish War against the Turks, and in the War of the Grand Alliance against France. He ruined the finances of his small duchy, however, using them to maintain a standing army, which by the time of his death counted over 10,000 men.

== Marriage and children ==
Frederick married firstly in Halle on 14 November 1669, Magdalena Sibylle of Saxe-Weissenfels. They had eight children:

1. Anna Sophie (b. Gotha, 22 December 1670 – d. Rudolstadt, 28 December 1728), married on 15 October 1691 to Louis Frederick I, Prince of Schwarzburg-Rudolstadt.
2. Magdalene Sibylle (b. Gotha, 30 September 1671 – d. Altenburg, 2 March 1673) died young.
3. Dorothea Marie (b. Gotha, 22 January 1674 – d. Meiningen, 18 April 1713), married on 19 September 1704 to Ernst Ludwig I, Duke of Saxe-Meiningen.
4. Fredericka (b. Gotha, 24 March 1675 – d. Karlsbad, 28 May 1709), married on 25 May 1702 to Johann August, Prince of Anhalt-Zerbst.
5. Frederick II, Duke of Saxe-Gotha-Altenburg (b. Gotha, 28 July 1676 – d. Altenburg, 23 March 1732).
6. Johann Wilhelm (b. Gotha, 4 October 1677 – killed in battle, Toulon, 15 August 1707), General Imperial, never married or had children.
7. Elisabeth (b. Gotha, 7 February 1679 – d. of smallpox, Gotha, 22 June 1680) died young.
8. Johanna (b. Gotha, 1 October 1680 – d. Strelitz, 9 July 1704), married on 20 June 1702 to Adolf Frederick II, Duke of Mecklenburg-Strelitz.

In Ansbach on 14 August 1681, Frederick married secondly Christine of Baden-Durlach. There were no children from this second marriage. Frederick died in Friedrichswerth, aged 45.

== Ancestry ==
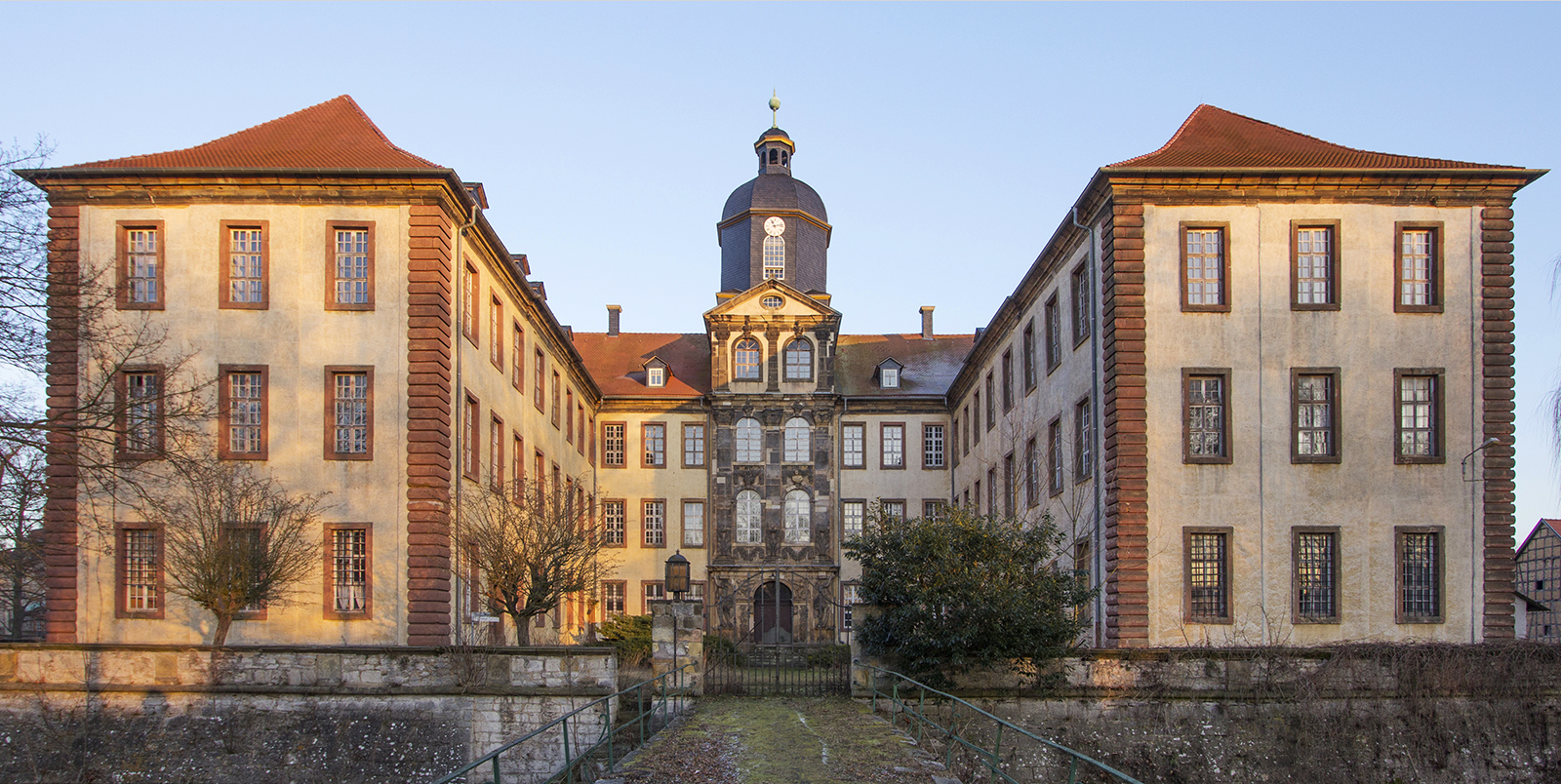
Lustschloss Friedrichswerth

Ancestors of Frederick I of Saxe-Gotha-Altenburg

8. Johann Wilhelm, Duke of Saxe-Weimar
4. John II, Duke of Saxe-Weimar
9. Dorothea Susanne of Simmern
2. Ernest I, Duke of Saxe-Gotha
10. Joachim Ernest, Prince of Anhalt
5. Dorothea Maria of Anhalt
11. Eleonore of Württemberg
1. Frederick I, Duke of Saxe-Gotha-Altenburg
12. Frederick Wilhelm I, Duke of Saxe-Weimar
6. Johann Philipp, Duke of Saxe-Altenburg
13. Anna Maria of the Palatinate-Neuburg
3. Elisabeth Sophie of Saxe-Altenburg
14. Henry Julius, Duke of Brunswick-Lüneburg
7. Elisabeth of Brünswick-Wolfenbüttel
15. Elizabeth of Denmark

Frederick I of Saxe-Gotha-Altenburg House of Wettin Born: 15 July 1646 Died: 2 August 1691
Regnal titles
Preceded by Ernest I (as Duke of Saxe-Gotha and Saxe-Altenburg)	Duke of Saxe-Gotha-Altenburg; 1675–1691	Succeeded by Frederick II
