= Princess Elisabeth of Schwarzburg-Rudolstadt =

Princess consort of Lippe (1833–1896)

Elisabeth of Schwarzburg-Rudolstadt
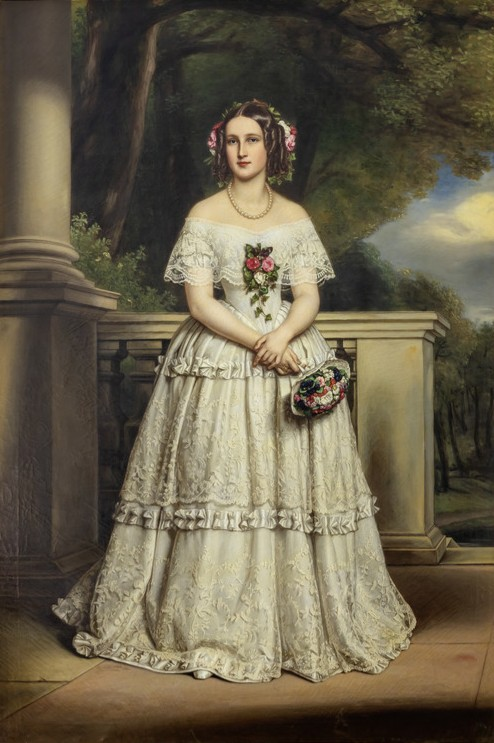
- Elisabeth in the year of her marriage, by Joseph Karl Stieler, c. 1852

Princess consort of Lippe
- Tenure: 17 April 1852 – 8 December 1875
- Born: 1 October 1833; Rudolstadt, Schwarzburg-Rudolstadt
- Died: 27 November 1896 (aged 63); Detmold, Germany
- Burial: 3 December 1896; Princely Crypt, Rudolstadt
- Spouse: Leopold III, Prince of Lippe (m. 1852; died 1875)
- House: Schwarzburg-Rudolstadt
- Father: Albert, Prince of Schwarzburg-Rudolstadt
- Mother: Princess Augusta of Solms-Braunfels

Princess Elisabeth of Schwarzburg-Rudolstadt (1 October 1833 – 27 November 1896) was Princess consort of Lippe as wife of Leopold III, Prince of Lippe from 1852 to 1875 and was the child of the reigning Albert, Prince of Schwarzburg-Rudolstadt.

== Life ==
Elisabeth of Schwarzburg-Rudolstadt was the second child and only daughter of Prince Albert of Schwarzburg-Rudolstadt and his wife Princess Augusta of Solms-Braunfels. The princess was raised “very simply and strictly” by a Swiss governess. Elisabeth received drawing and painting lessons from the later Rudolstadt court painter Richard Schinzel.

On April 17, 1852, she married Leopold III, Prince of Lippe and moved with him to Detmold. Elisabeth remained close to her homeland, and even after her marriage she regularly visited Rudolstadt. The princess was popular with the population, but the couple became increasingly estranged from each other, from which Elisabeth suffered greatly.

Elisabeth was known for her charity and care; she used almost all of the resources at her disposal for charitable purposes. She also published various writings (including a booklet with Bible sayings for every day) and artistically designed Bible and baptismal sayings, but also larger art sheets, all of which were printed in large quantities. The proceeds from these works also benefited charity.

In 1861 the princess founded a children's institution in Blomberg, which was named the Elisabeth Institution after her She also promoted the founding and maintenance of the Augustineum Secondary School in Namibia. Detmold's Elisabethstrasse also bears this name in her honor.

After Leopold's death, the marriage remained childless, Elisabeth moved into her widow's residence in the Neues Palace. From then on she only rarely took on representative tasks, but continued to follow political and social events as well as her social concerns. In 1884 she arranged for Princess Luise (a sister of Woldemar, Prince of Lippe) to hand over her palace to the state pension chamber in order to house the "Princely Public Library" (today Lippe State Library at Detmold). In addition, the widowed princess financed, among other things, the new building of the Hostel to the Homeland with 30,000 marks in 1885. The gymnasium of the Detmold Girls' School also owed its existence to Elisabeth; she was the patron of this school and the patron of the eight Detmold women's clubs.

Since the death of her brother George Albert, to whom she shared a close bond throughout her life, Elisabeth stayed regularly in Niederkrossen. She managed the manor there, which became her property after Georg Albert's death. At her initiative, a handicraft school was also set up in town. During her last stay in the fall of 1896, the Dowager Princess contracted pneumonia, as a result of which she died on November 27 at around 11 p.m. In accordance with her wishes, Elisabeth was not buried in Detmold, but on December 3, 1896, in the princely crypt of the Rudolstadt town church St. Andreas.

== Ancestry ==
Ancestors of Princess Elisabeth of Schwarzburg-Rudolstadt

Frederick Charles, Prince of Schwarzburg-Rudolstadt
Louis Frederick II, Prince of Schwarzburg-Rudolstadt
Princess Friederike of Schwarzburg-Rudolstadt
Albert, Prince of Schwarzburg-Rudolstadt
Frederick V, Landgrave of Hesse-Homburg
Princess Caroline of Hesse-Homburg
Princess Caroline of Hesse-Darmstadt
Princess Elisabeth of Schwarzburg-Rudolstadt
Ferdinand, Prince of Solms-Braunfels
Prince Frederick William of Solms-Braunfels
Countess Sophie Christine Wilhelmine of Solms-Laubach
Princess Augusta of Solms-Braunfels
Charles II, Grand Duke of Mecklenburg-Strelitz
Duchess Frederica of Mecklenburg-Strelitz
Princess Friederike of Hesse-Darmstadt

Princess Elisabeth of Schwarzburg-Rudolstadt House of Schwarzburg Born: 1 October 1833 Died: 27 November 1896
German royalty
Regnal titles
Preceded by Emilie of Schwarzburg-Sondershausen	Princess consort of Lippe; 17 April 1852 – 8 December 1875	Succeeded by Princess Sophie of Baden
