= Princess Anna Louise of Schönburg-Waldenburg =

Princess of Schwarzburg-Rudolstadt and Schwarzburg-Sondershausen (1871–1951)

Princess Anna Louise
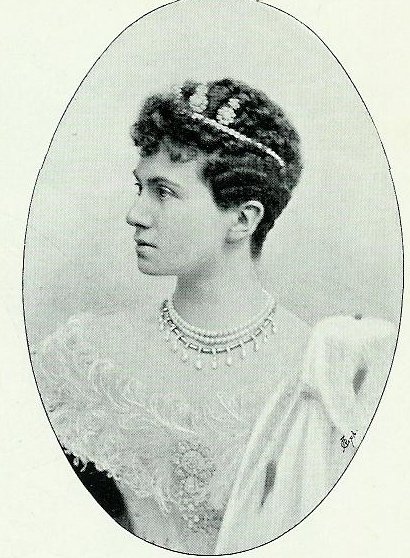
- Anna Louise in 1898

Princess consort of Schwarzburg-Rudolstadt
- Tenure: 9 December 1891 - 22 November 1918

Princess consort of Schwarzburg-Sondershausen
- Tenure: 28 March 1909 – 22 November 1918
- Born: 19 February 1871; Hermsdorf Castle, Hermsdorf, Saxony-Anhalt
- Died: 7 November 1951 (aged 80); Sondershausen Palace, Thuringia, East Germany
- Spouse: Günther Victor, Prince of Schwarzburg (m. 1891; died 1925)
- House: House of Schönburg
- Father: Prince Georg of Schönburg-Waldenburg
- Mother: Princess Luise of Bentheim-Tecklenburg

Princess Anna Louise of Schönburg-Waldenburg (Anna Louise; 19 February 1871 – 7 November 1951) was born a member and princess of the House of Schönburg and was a Princess consort of Schwarzburg-Sondershausen and Princess consort of Schwarzburg-Rudolstadt as the wife Günther Victor, Prince of Schwarzburg, the last sovereign prince of Schwarzburg-Rudolstadt and Schwarzburg-Sondershausen.

She was the grand aunt of Princess Anna Luisa Pignatelli Schoenburg (see Schönburg family).

== Biography ==
=== Childhood and youth ===
On February 19, 1871, Anna Luise was born in Hermsdorf Castle as the only daughter and youngest child of Prince Georg of Schönburg-Waldenburg and Princess Luise, daughter of Prince Adolf of Bentheim -Tecklenburg-Rheda, to the world. Together with her brothers Prince Hermann of Schönburg-Waldenburg and Prince Ulrich, she spent her childhood in Hermsdorf and Schneeberg.

She was only allowed to live in her own room from the age of eight, as she was previously under the strict supervision of a nanny. At the age of six she was taught for the first time together with her brother Ulrich and the children of Captain von Hoffmann and the head forester von Obereigner. One of their teachers was Pastor Arnold Braue, who was later appointed general superintendent in Rudolstadt. Her training also included music and drawing lessons. Anna Luise learned the violin and, from 1879, the piano from her mother. She was taught painting and drawing by the landscape painter Oskar Schütz and the portrait painter Heinrich Schönchen. Because her father bred horses, she learned the art of riding as a child.

In order to acquire the correct appearance and behavior in noble circles, her mother took control of her upbringing so that Anna Luise could prepare herself as best as possible for her future role as a representative of royal society. She accompanied her mother to courtesy calls, tea times, cultural and charitable events.

Her first love was Count Pückler, a college friend of her brother Hermann. But since she, as a prince's daughter, had to marry in accordance with her status, the count was forbidden to her.

=== Princess of Schwarzburg-Rudolstadt ===
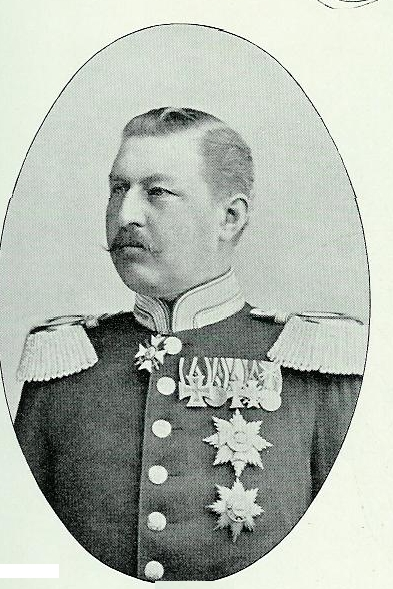
Günther Victor von Schwarzburg-Rudolstadt

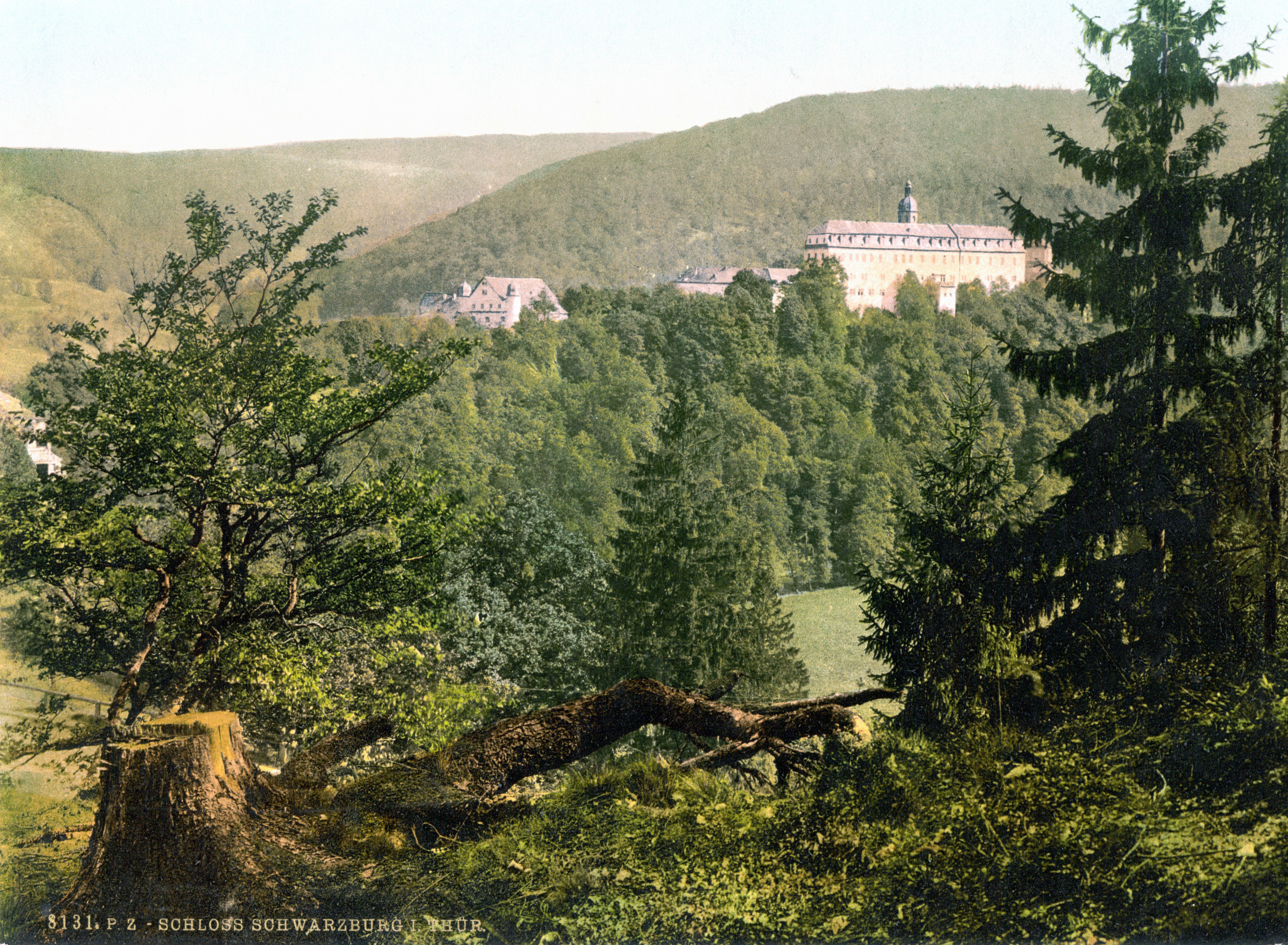
Schloss Schwarzburg before 1900

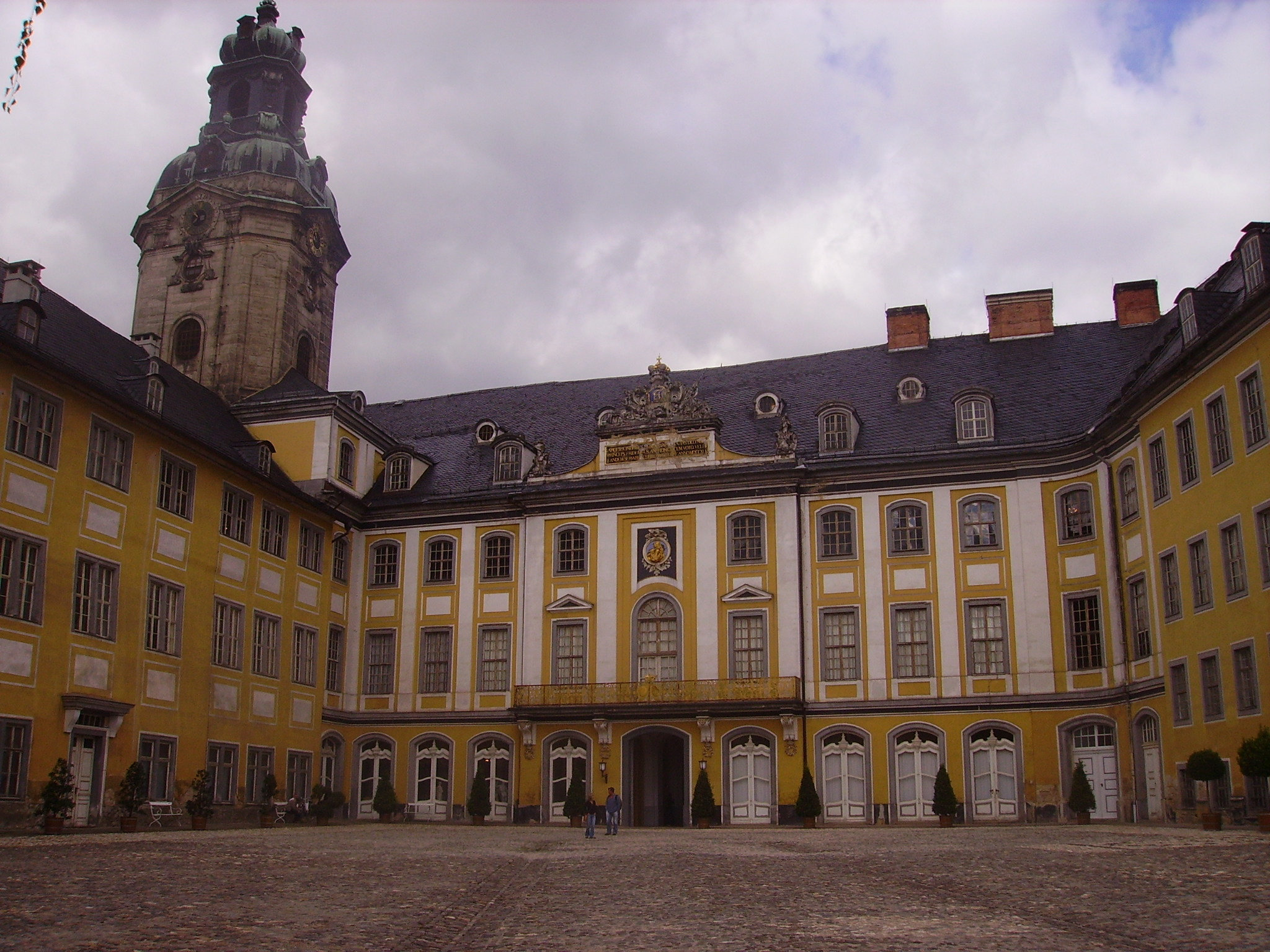
Heidecksburg Castle in Rudolstadt

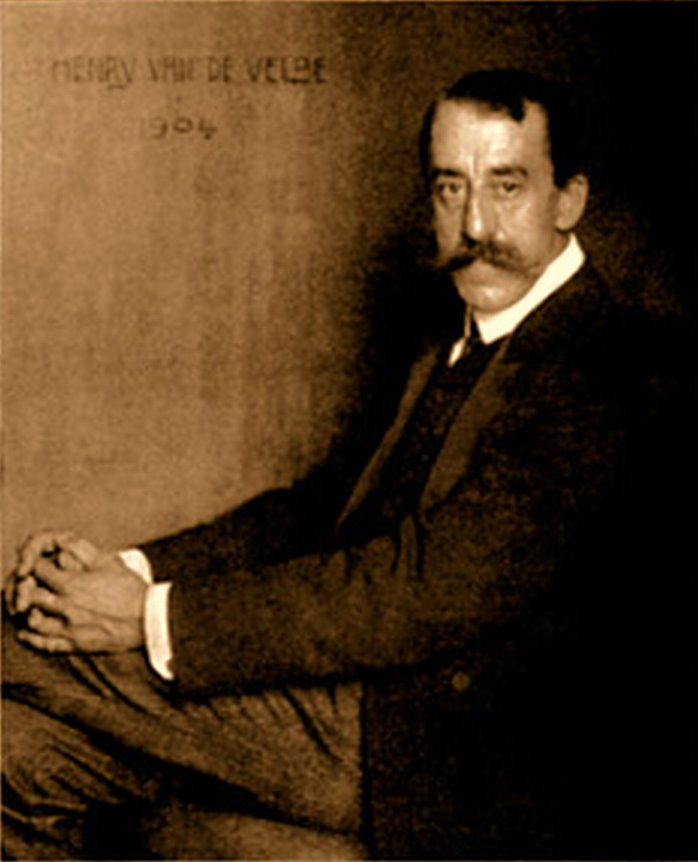
Henry van de Velde 1904 on a photograph by Nicola Perscheid.

On November 8, 1891, Anna Luise became engaged to her cousin Günther Victor, Prince of Schwarzburg-Rudolstadt, who was 19 years older than her, after his engagement to Princess Louise Charlotte of Saxe-Altenburg was mutually broken off. The marriage arranged within the family unit was concluded on December 9, 1891, in Rudolstadt. While the civil wedding took place in the Red Rooms in Heidecksburg Castle, the church wedding then took place in the castle church (today: Porcelain Gallery). 130 guests attended the festivities.

The pregnancy was happily announced six months after the wedding. This seemed to secure the succession to the throne. But complications arose in the 7th month, and on September 1, 1892, a boy was stillborn. He was strong and theoretically viable, but the child had already died in the womb. The princess then fell into puerperal fever, coupled with pleurisy and abdominal inflammation as well as partial cardiac paralysis. Late effects prevented future pregnancies, which represented a dynastic catastrophe for the royal family.

Anna Luise was affected by the miscarriage, which was also reflected in her appearance. Contrary to the fashion of the time, she had her hair cut short, and her clothes often did not correspond to prevailing taste. Harry Graf Kessler described her as "a fabulously inelegant woman in a white blouse and with short-cut hair who looked deceptively similar to Maximilian Harden".

The princess remained politically reserved as much as possible, knowing full well about current political affairs. Only after 1914 would their role change radically.

By marrying Günther Victor, she took on the role of “country mother” as the prince's wife. She was responsible for the patronage of various non-profit institutions and associations. For example, in 1893 she supported the establishment of an old-age and poor welfare service in Quittelsdorf and in 1901 that of the Anna-Luisen-Stift in Bad Blankenburg. She was also present at numerous war club, civic or shooting festivals and inaugurations of public buildings, as well as the Kyffhäuser Monument near Bad Frankenhausen.

In 1906, Anna Luise met Henry van de Velde, the founder of the Kunstgewerbeschule in Weimar, at Schwarzburg Castle, and he had been a welcome guest of the royal family ever since. They even gave him a refuge in the Fasanerie near Schwarzburg, which he furnished according to his own designs. The princess did have one rather conservative taste in art, but she was very open to van de Velde's work. She went to Weimar for the first time in May 1907 to visit this extraordinary artist. At the prince's invitation to his ceremonial assumption of government in the Principality of Schwarzburg-Sondershausen, Henry van de Velde followed the royal couple to the royal residence Sondershausen in 1909.

=== Princess of Schwarzburg-Sondershausen ===
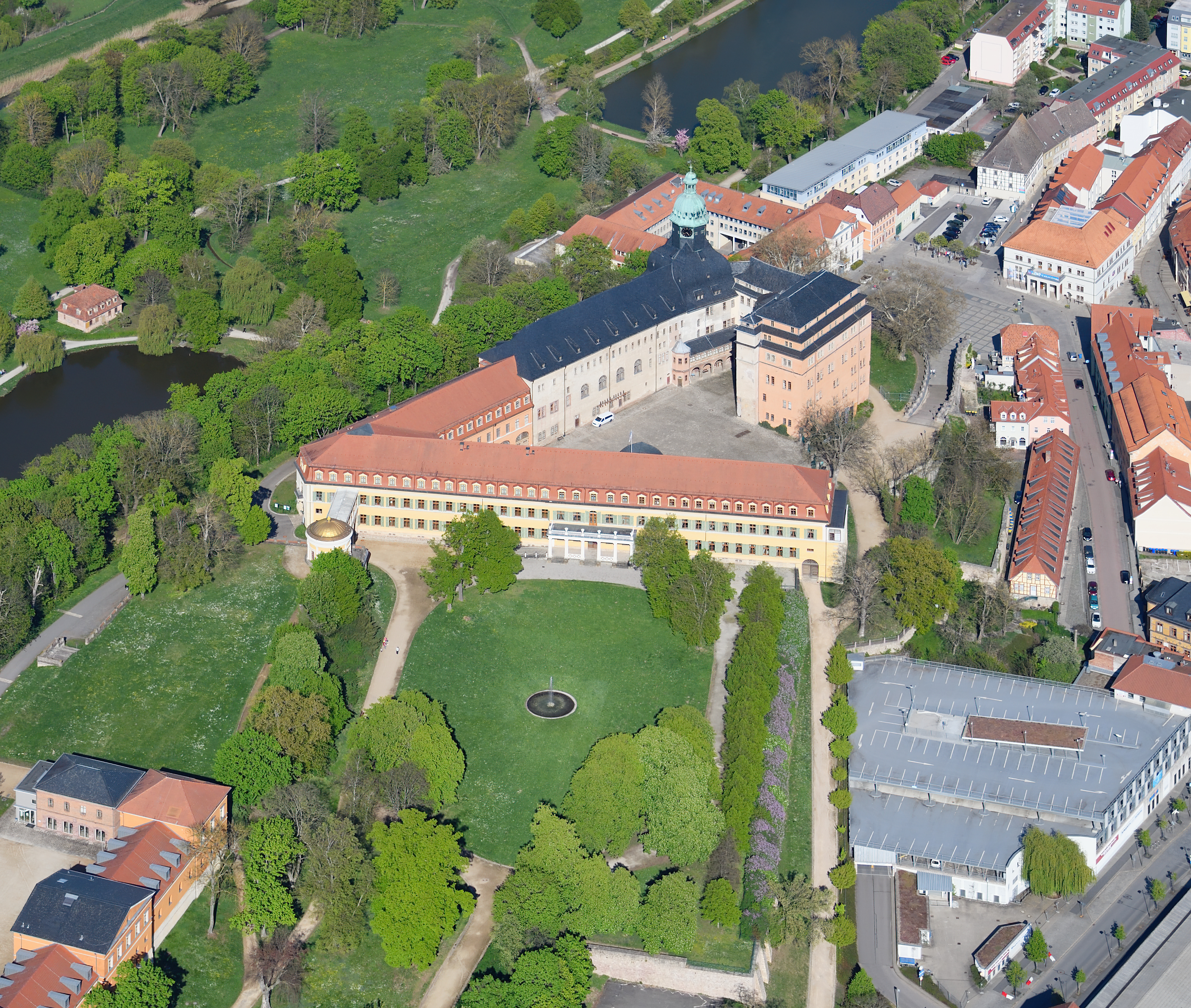
Residential castle in Sondershausen

After the death of Prince Charles Gonthier, Prince of Schwarzburg-Sondershausen and the associated extinction of the Sondershausen partial line in the male line, Günther Victor also took over the government for this principality in personal union in 1909. Anna Luise also received the title of Princess of Schwarzburg-Sondershausen.

From this point on, the royal couple had six different residences, which they had to change regularly about every two months.

In order to ensure the continued existence of the House of Schwarzburg, Sizzo, Prince of Schwarzburg was appointed as successor by law of June 1, 1896 and recognized as a member of the Schwarzburg male line. Since then he has been allowed to call himself “Prince of Schwarzburg”. But over time the relationship between the great cousins Sizzo and Günther Victor deteriorated. Sizzo constantly felt disadvantaged, without any valid reasons. A dispute that even appeared in the press caused the prince to deny Sizzo residence in the castles of Rudolstadt and Schwarzburg, and in 1910 he was only allowed to call himself “Prince of Schwarzburg” by decree. In 1918 the conflict became so severe that they only communicated through lawyers.

Due to her husband's unstable nerves and his circulatory and heart problems, Anna Luise had to adapt her daily routine to her husband's state of health as much as possible. She often traveled with Günther Victor for medically prescribed treatments. In quiet hours, when her husband was at cabinet meetings or hunting, she took the time to write, read and her favorite pastime, photography.

=== The end of the monarchy ===
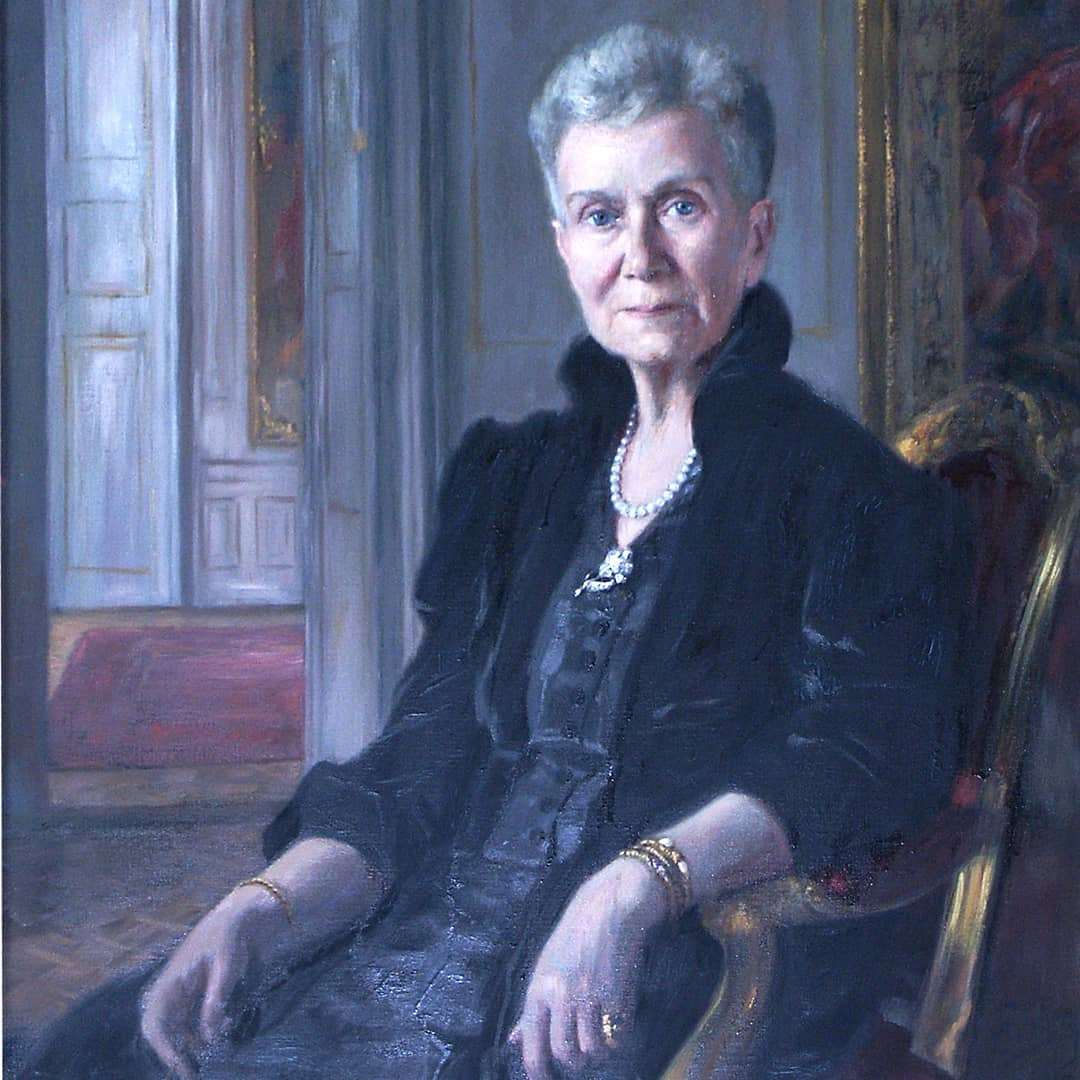
Princess Anna Luise, 1941, portrait of Gottfried Albert Maria Bachem

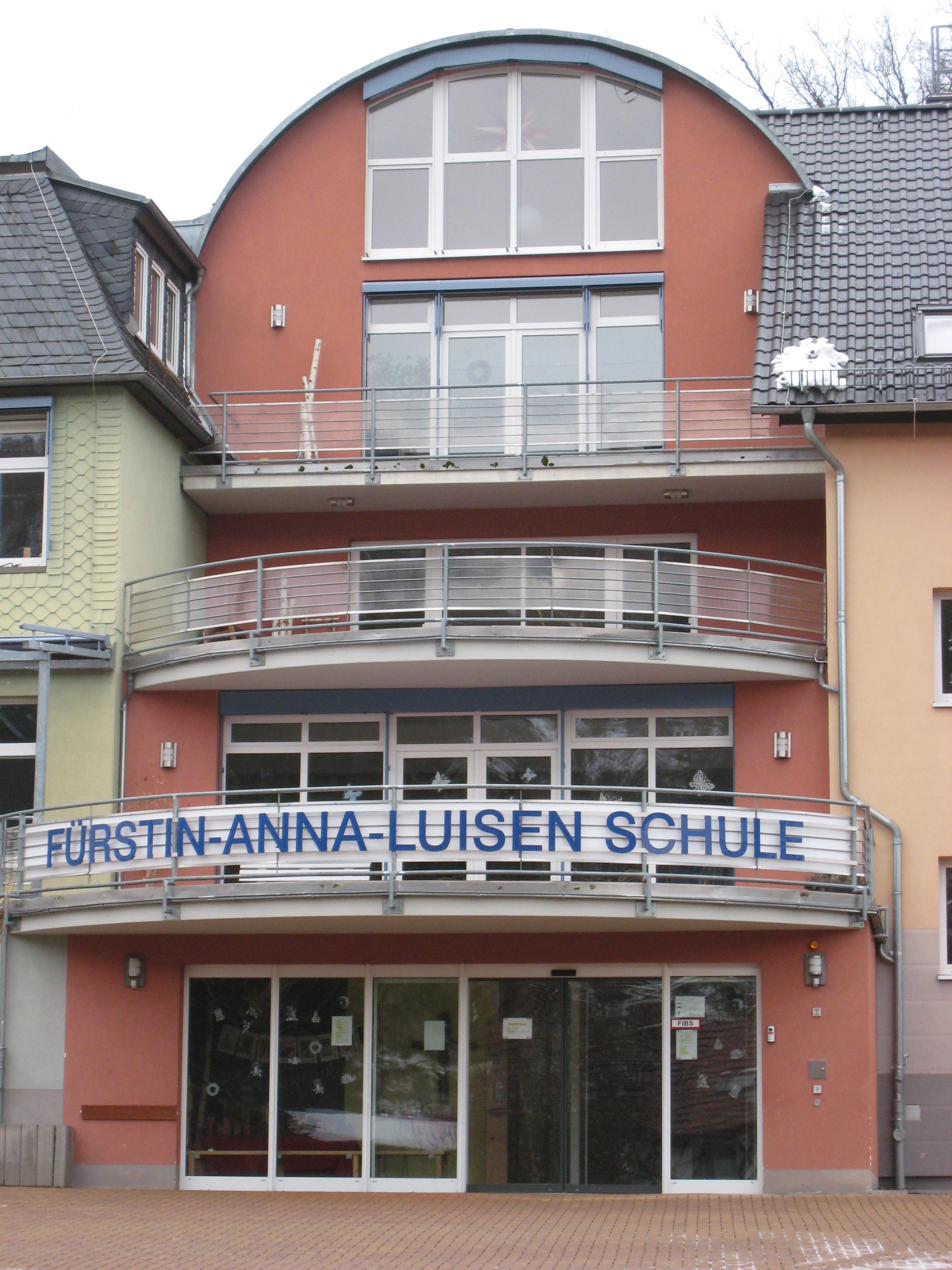
School in Bad Blankenburg, Königseer Straße 42, which bears the name of the princess

As part of the November Revolution in 1918, Günther Victor was the last Federal Prince to abdicate as Prince of Schwarzburg-Rudolstadt on November 23 and as Prince of Schwarzburg-Sondershausen on November 25. Afterwards, the royal couple retained the castles of Schwarzburg and Rathsfeld with the associated lands and residential rights in the residential castles of Heidecksburg and Sondershausen. The state of Thuringia guaranteed them an appropriate annual allowance. A large part of the assets and art assets were transferred to the “Fürst Günther Foundation”, which was founded on November 22, 1918.

It was only after a long time with a heavy heart that Anna Luise was able to accept the forced loss of meaning. According to her, the current rulers probably only wanted to keep them as “historical rarities”. The question of the princely house's severance payment, which the state of Thuringia was supposed to pay, was ultimately never clarified.

On April 16, 1925, Günther Victor died in Sondershausen Castle after a long illness. Her husband had made her sole heir, so she had to continue the legal dispute with Sizzo. Even after his death in 1926, Anna Luise ruled out adopting his only son Prince Friedrich Günther of Schwarzburg because he continued his father's legal battle against her. In 1942, the last Princess of Schwarzburg decided to adopt Prince Wilhelm of Schönburg-Waldenburg, the youngest son of her brother Ulrich.

In 1945, however, it was expropriated and most of the Schwarzburg property was transferred to public ownership. However, she was allowed to stay in the Sondershausen residential palace until her death in 1951. She was one of three members of former ruling houses who became citizens of the GDR in 1949, alongside Ernst II, Duke of Saxe-Altenburg, the only one of the German federal princes who ruled until 1918, and Princess Adelaide of Schaumburg-Lippe.

=== Later life ===
The prince died in 1925. Anna Luise, the last princess of Schwarzburg, had to vacate the castle within a few days on the orders of the imperial government. It was to be converted into Adolf Hitler's Reich guesthouse. After the Second World War, the princess lived under the most difficult living conditions in Sondershausen Castle.

After her death, Anna Louise left behind an almost complete series of diaries spanning sixty years from which her life can be reconstructed.

She died in 1951. With great sympathy from the population, she was buried in the crypt of the Rudolstadt town church.

== Literature ==
- Gerlinde Countess of Westphalen: Anna Luise of Schwarzburg. The last princess. Jenzig Verlag, Jena 2005, 4th updated edition 2015, ISBN 978-3 9101-4172-8.
