= Landtag of Schwarzburg-Rudolstadt =

Unicameral legislature

Landtag of Schwarzburg-Rudolstadt Landtag Schwarzburg-Rudolstadt

Type
- Type: Unicameral

History
- Founded: 1821
- Disbanded: 1923
- Seats: 15 (1821–1848); 19 (1848–1854); 16 (1854–1918); 17 (1918–1921); 10 (1921–1923)

The Landtag of Schwarzburg-Rudolstadt was the unicameral legislature of the Principality of Schwarzburg-Rudolstadt. It existed from 1821 until 1923, five years after the dissolution of the principality.

== History ==
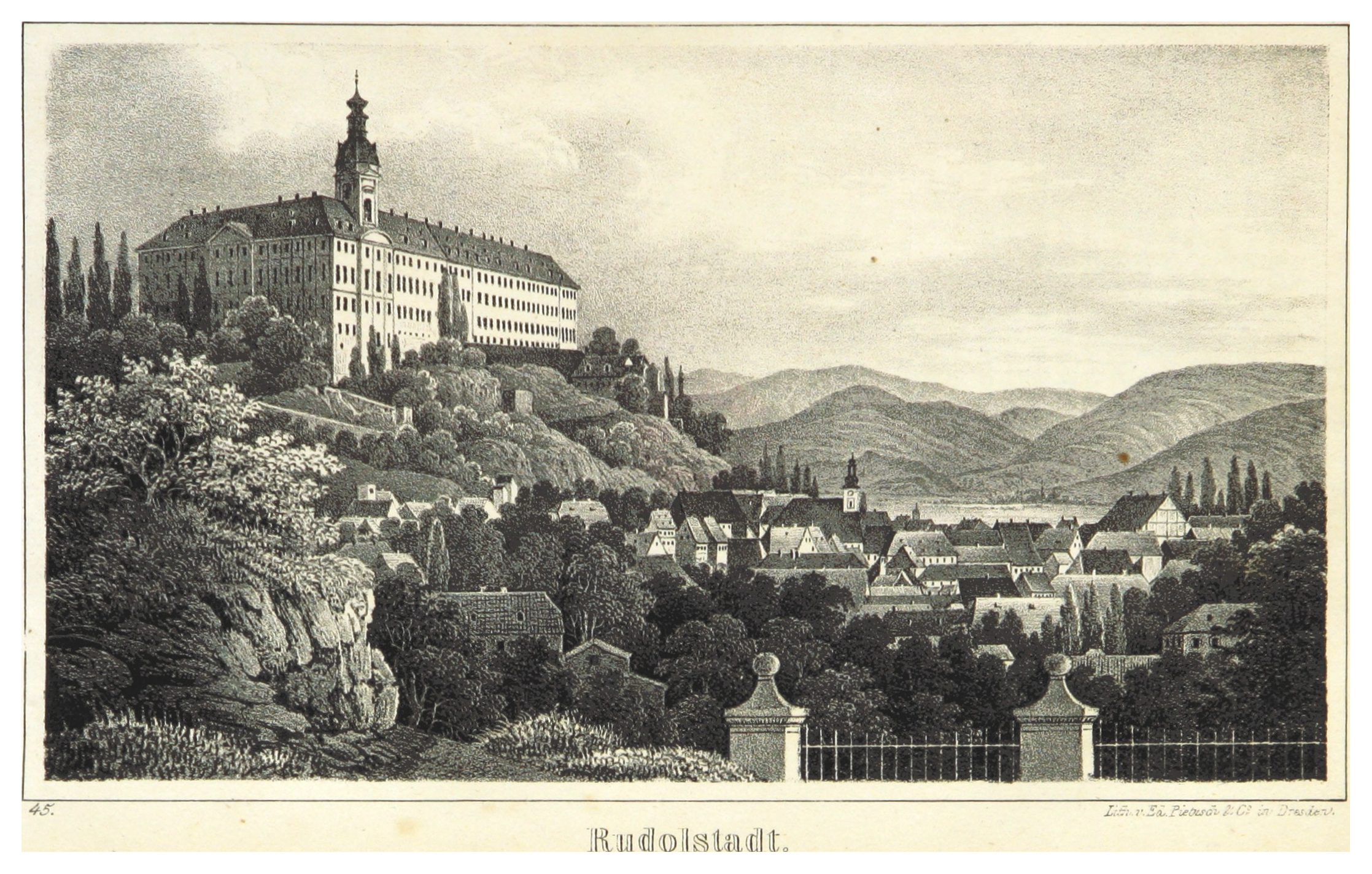
Rudolstadt, seat of the Diet

Article XIII of the 1815 Constitution of the German Confederation compelled member states to adopt constitutions. Friedrich Günther, Prince of Schwarzburg-Rudolstadt led the creation of the principality's constitution and diet in 1816, though the first parliamentary session did not begin until 1821. The initial composition of the parliament consisted of fifteen members representing the manorial lords, city dwellers, and land-owning subjects.

Following the Revolutions of 1848, Schwarzburg-Rudolstadt adopted administrative reforms which affected the diet. The diet was thenceforth composed of nineteen members, elected in equal yet indirect elections. Further administrative reforms took place following the state's entry into the North German Confederation in 1866 and after the dissolution of the Principality and subsequent creation of the short-lived Free State of Schwarzburg-Rudolstadt in 1918. Following the formation of the State of Thuringia on 1 May 1920, the diet continued to exist as a regional representative body within the Thuringian state parliament until 1923.
