= Hans Kiewning =

German painter

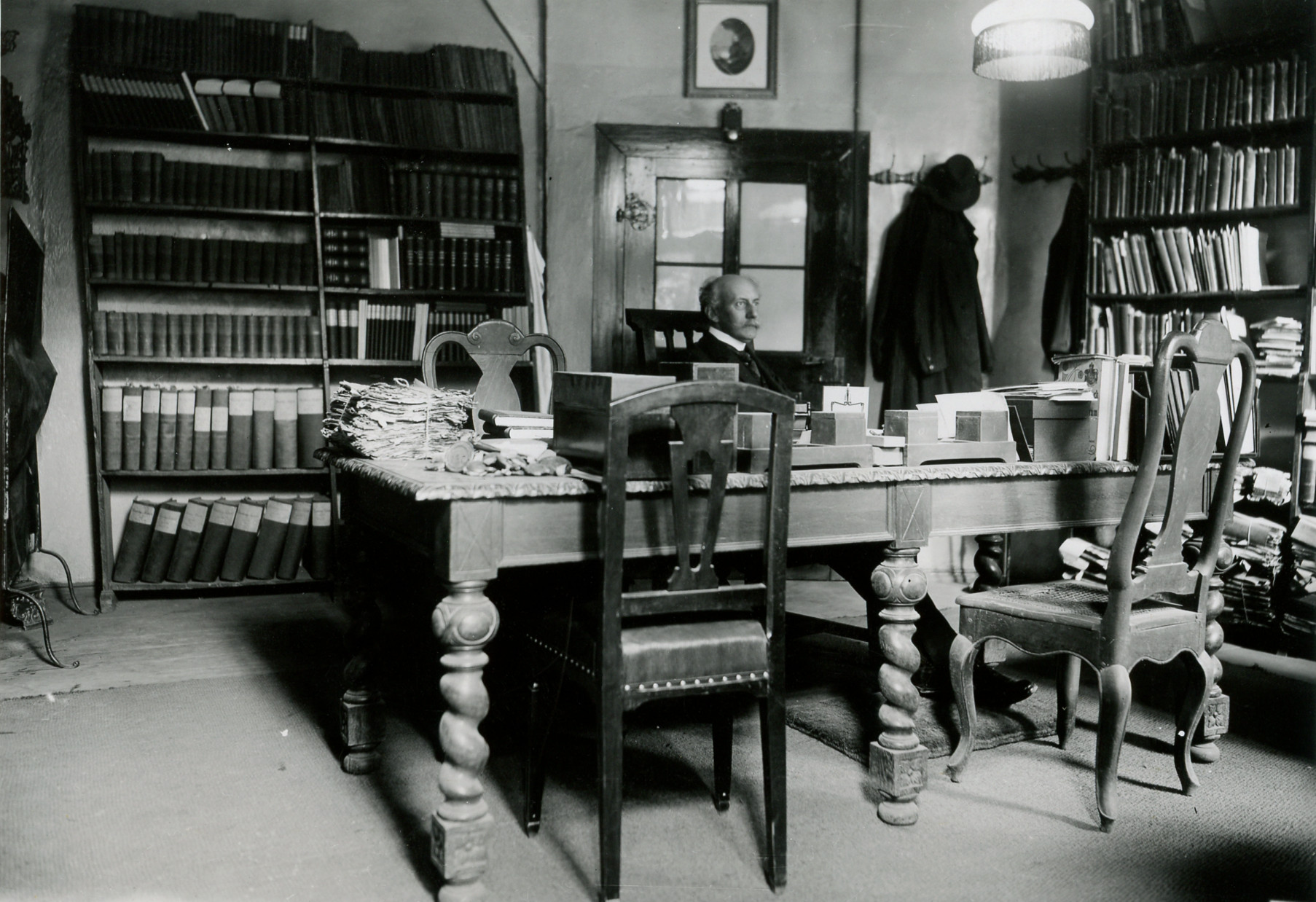
Kiewning in the archives of Detmold Castle.

Hans Johann Karl Kiewning (20 August 1864 – 13 July 1939) was a German archive director, library director, historian, writer and painter.

Kiewning was born in Königsberg. He studied philology at the University of Königsberg, where in 1889 he received his doctorate. From 1891 to 1895 he worked for the Prussian Historical Institute at the Vatican in Rome. From 1917 to 1933 he served as director of the regional archives in Detmold, and in the meantime, gave lectures at the local business academy (1919–24) and was regional director of the Lippe library in Detmold (1924–33). He married Marie Süpply. They had two sons, Bernhard (1900–1918) and Hans Georg (1903–1933).

In 1930 he published a biography of Princess Pauline of Lippe titled Fürstin Pauline zur Lippe, 1769–1820. He was also the author of Lippische Geschichte, a history of Lippe up until the death of Bernhard VIII. He died in Bad Reichenhall.
