= 1919 Schwarzburg-Rudolstadt state election =

German state election

The 1919 Schwarzburg-Rudolstadt state election was held on 9 March 1919 to elect the 17 members of the Landtag of Schwarzburg-Rudolstadt.

== Results ==
Party	Votes	%	Seats
Social Democratic Party of Germany	22,707	54.10	11
German Democratic Party	6,183	14.73	3
Civil List	5,712	13.61	2
German National People's Party and German People's Party	4,512	10.75	1
Independent Social Democratic Party of Germany	2,860	6.81	0
Total	41,974	100.00	17
Registered voters/turnout	59,168	–	
Source: Elections in the Weimar Republic
