= George Albert, Prince of Schwarzburg-Rudolstadt =

George Albert
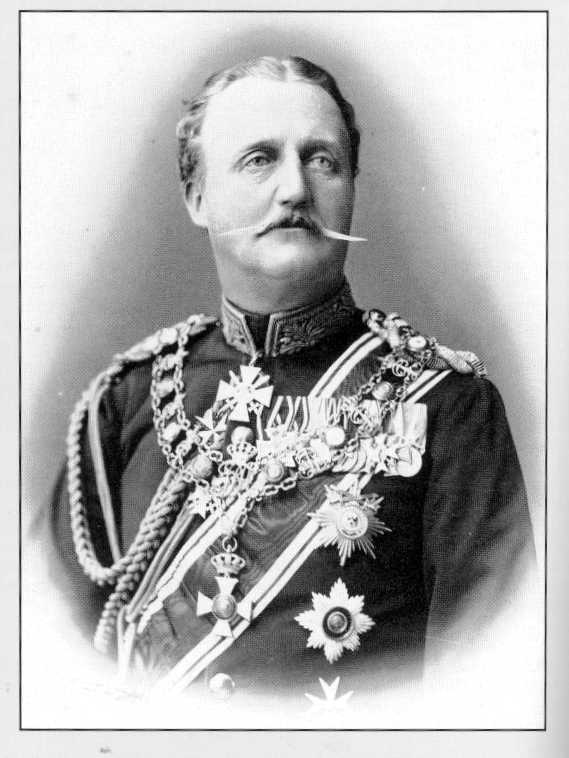
- George Albert c. 1870s–1880s

Prince of Schwarzburg-Rudolstadt
- Reign: 28 November 1869 – 19 January 1890
- Predecessor: Albert
- Successor: Günther Victor
- Born: 23 November 1838; Rudolstadt, Schwarzburg-Rudolstadt
- Died: 19 January 1890 (aged 51); Rudolstadt, Schwarzburg-Rudolstadt
- House: Schwarzburg-Rudolstadt
- Father: Albert, Prince of Schwarzburg-Rudolstadt
- Mother: Princess Augusta of Solms-Braunfels

Georg Albert, Prince of Schwarzburg-Rudolstadt (23 November 1838 – 19 January 1890) was the penultimate sovereign prince of Schwarzburg-Rudolstadt.

== Biography ==
He was born in Rudolstadt the son of Prince Albert of Schwarzburg-Rudolstadt and his wife Princess Augusta of Solms-Braunfels. Princess Augusta was the daughter of Prince Friedrich Wilhelm of Solms-Braunfels and his wife Duchess Frederica of Mecklenburg-Strelitz, the daughter of Grand Duke Charles II.

Following the death of his uncle Friedrich Günther on 28 June 1867, his father Albert ascended the throne thereby making Georg the heir apparent with the title Hereditary Prince. His father died on 26 November 1869, two years after ascending the throne, with Georg becoming the new sovereign prince.

During his reign, the North German Confederation was dissolved following the victory of the Kingdom of Prussia backed by states of the confederation in the Franco-Prussian War over the Second French Empire. As a result, on 18 January 1871, the King of Prussia was proclaimed German Emperor and so Prince Georg no longer ruled over an independent state as Schwarzburg-Rudolstadt became a state of the German Empire and therefore Prince Georg was subordinate to the German Emperor.

== Personal life ==
Prince Georg was engaged to Duchess Marie of Mecklenburg-Schwerin, his second cousin once removed and stepdaughter of his cousin Grand Duchess Marie of Mecklenburg-Schwerin. She broke off the engagement to marry Grand Duke Vladimir Alexandrovich of Russia. After that, he never married and following his death in Rudolstadt he was succeeded as prince by his first cousin once removed Günther. He was buried in Stadtkirche in Rudolstadt.

== Honours ==
- Kingdom of Bavaria: Knight of St. Hubert, 1858
- Kingdom of Prussia:
  - Knight of the Red Eagle, 3rd Class with Swords, 1864; 1st Class with Swords, 1871; Grand Cross with Swords on Ring, 12 October 1880
  - Member of Honour of the Johanniter Order, 1884
- (Saxe-Coburg and Gotha) (Duchy of Saxe-Altenburg) (Saxe-Meiningen) Ernestine duchies: Grand Cross of the Saxe-Ernestine House Order, October 1865
- Grand Duchy of Hesse: Grand Cross of the Ludwig Order, 28 November 1865
- Oldenburg: Grand Cross of the Order of Duke Peter Friedrich Ludwig, with Golden Crown, 3 January 1870
- Duchy of Anhalt: Grand Cross of Albert the Bear, 1872
- Kingdom of Saxony:
  - Knight of the Military Order of St. Henry, 1872
  - Knight of the Rue Crown, 1882

George Albert, Prince of Schwarzburg-Rudolstadt House of Schwarzburg-Rudolstadt Cadet branch of the House of Schwarzburg Born: 23 November 1838 Died: 19 January 1890
Regnal titles
Preceded by Albert	Prince of Schwarzburg-Rudolstadt; 1869–1890	Succeeded by Günther
