= Albert, Prince of Schwarzburg-Rudolstadt =

Albert
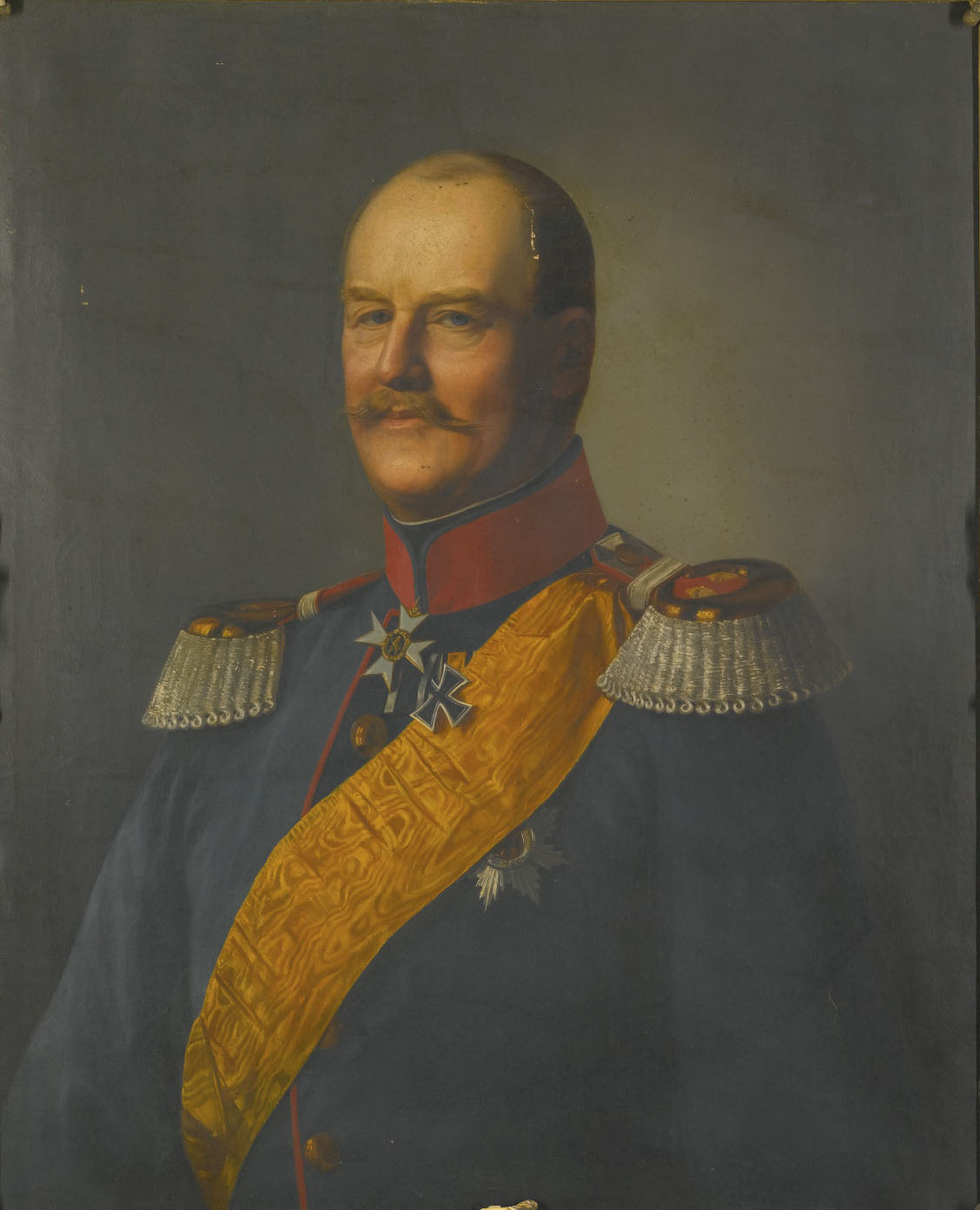

Prince of Schwarzburg-Rudolstadt
- Reign: 28 June 1867 – 26 November 1869
- Predecessor: Friedrich Günther
- Successor: George Albert
- Born: 30 April 1798; Rudolstadt, Schwarzburg-Rudolstadt
- Died: 26 November 1869 (aged 71); Rudolstadt, Schwarzburg-Rudolstadt
- Spouse: Princess Augusta of Solms-Braunfels (m. 1827; died 1865)
- Issue: Prince Karl Günther; Elisabeth, Princess of Lippe; George Albert, Prince of Schwarzburg-Rudolstadt; Prince Ernst Heinrich
- House: Schwarzburg-Rudolstadt
- Father: Louis Frederick II, Prince of Schwarzburg-Rudolstadt
- Mother: Landgravine Caroline of Hesse-Homburg

Albert, Prince of Schwarzburg-Rudolstadt (30 April 1798 – 26 November 1869) was a sovereign prince of Schwarzburg-Rudolstadt. He ruled from 1867 to 1869.

== Biography ==
He was born in Rudolstadt, the second son of the reigning prince of Schwarzburg-Rudolstadt, Louis Frederick II and his wife Landgravine Caroline of Hesse-Homburg. His father died on 28 April 1807, and his brother Friedrich Günther (* 1793) succeeded him as sovereign prince with Albert becoming the heir presumptive. Landgravine Caroline acted as regent for Albert's brother Friedrich Günther until he came of age in 1814. As a Prussian Lieutenant, the 16-year-old Albert participated 1814 and 1815 as member of the staff of Louis William, Landgrave of Hesse-Homburg, his uncle, in the Prussian campaign against Napoleon Bonaparte. Serving in the Prussian army, he married 1827 Auguste zu Solms-Braunfels, a niece of the Prussian king.

Following the death of his brother Friedrich Günther on 28 June 1867, Albert succeeded his brother as reigning prince instead of his nephew Prince Sizzo of Leutenberg, who was born as a result of a morganatic marriage. His short two-year reign came to an end following his death in Rudolstadt. He was succeeded by his son Hereditary Prince Georg.

== Marriage and children ==
On 26 July 1827, Prince Albert was married to Princess Augusta Luise of Solms-Braunfels, daughter of Duchess Frederica of Mecklenburg-Strelitz and Prince Frederick William of Solms-Braunfels and niece of the Prussian king Friedrich Wilhelm III. They had:

- Prince Karl Günther (1828-1828)
- Princess Elisabeth (1833–1896) married Leopold III, Prince of Lippe
- Prince Georg (1838–1890)
- Prince Ernst Heinrich (1848-1848)

Albert, Prince of Schwarzburg-Rudolstadt House of Schwarzburg-Rudolstadt Cadet branch of the House of Schwarzburg Born: 30 April 1798 Died: 26 November 1869
Regnal titles
Preceded by Friedrich Günther	Prince of Schwarzburg-Rudolstadt; 1867–1869	Succeeded by George Albert
