= Friedrich Günther, Prince of Schwarzburg-Rudolstadt =

Friedrich Günther
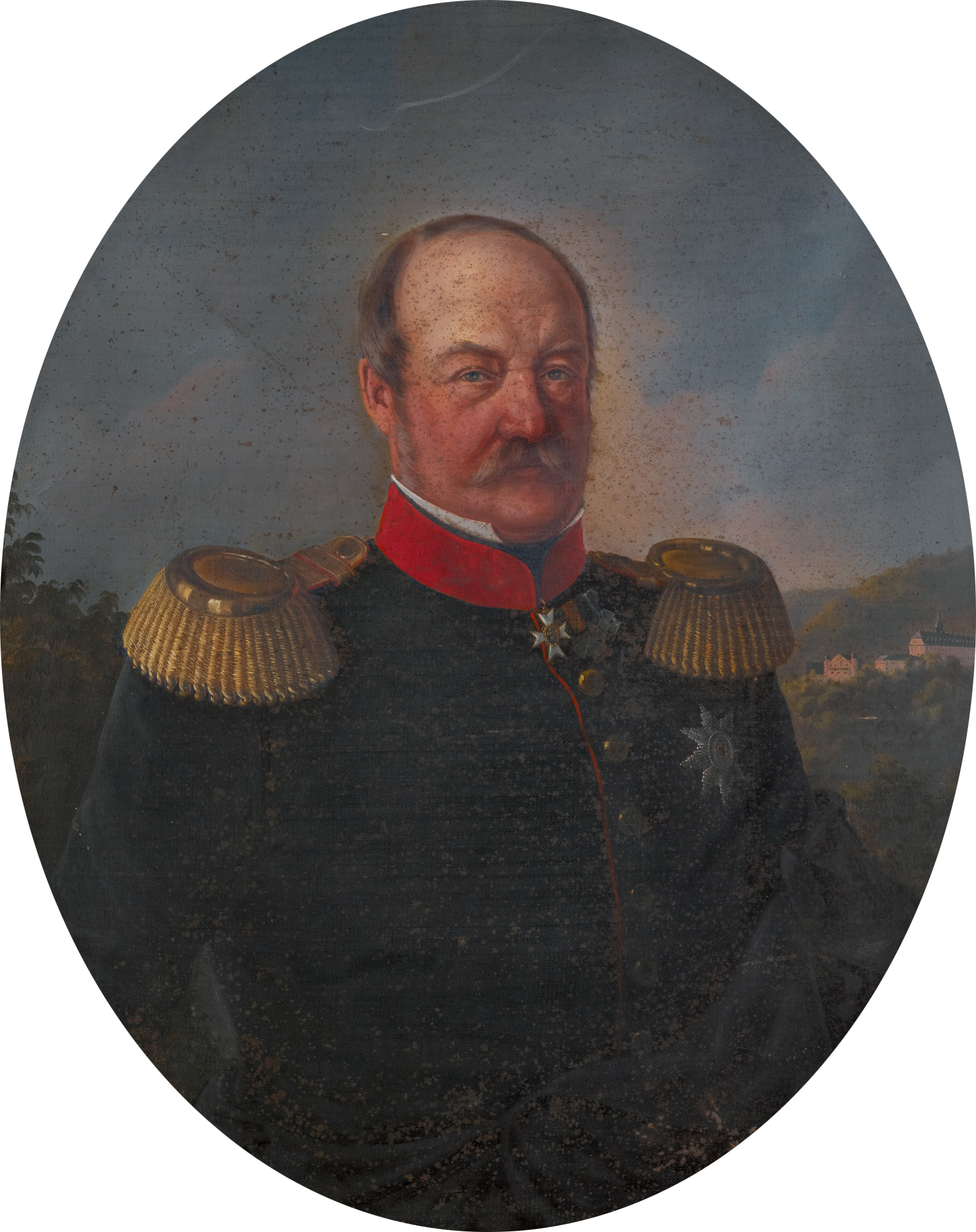
- 1859 portrait

Prince of Schwarzburg-Rudolstadt
- Reign: 28 April 1807 – 28 June 1867
- Predecessor: Louis Frederick II
- Successor: Albert
- Born: 6 November 1793; Rudolstadt, Schwarzburg-Rudolstadt
- Died: 28 June 1867 (aged 73); Rudolstadt, Schwarzburg-Rudolstadt
- Spouse: Princess Auguste of Anhalt-Dessau (m. 1816; died 1854) Countess Helene of Reina (m. 1855; died 1860) Marie Schultze (m. 1861)
- Issue: Prince Friedrich Günther; Prince Günther; Prince Gustav; Princess Helene, Princess Hans of Schoenaich-Carolath; Sizzo, Prince of Schwarzburg; Illegitimate: Marie Macheleidt; Emma Macheleidt; Helene Macheleidt
- House: House of Schwarzburg-Rudolstadt
- Father: Louis Frederick II, Prince of Schwarzburg-Rudolstadt
- Mother: Landgravine Caroline of Hesse-Homburg

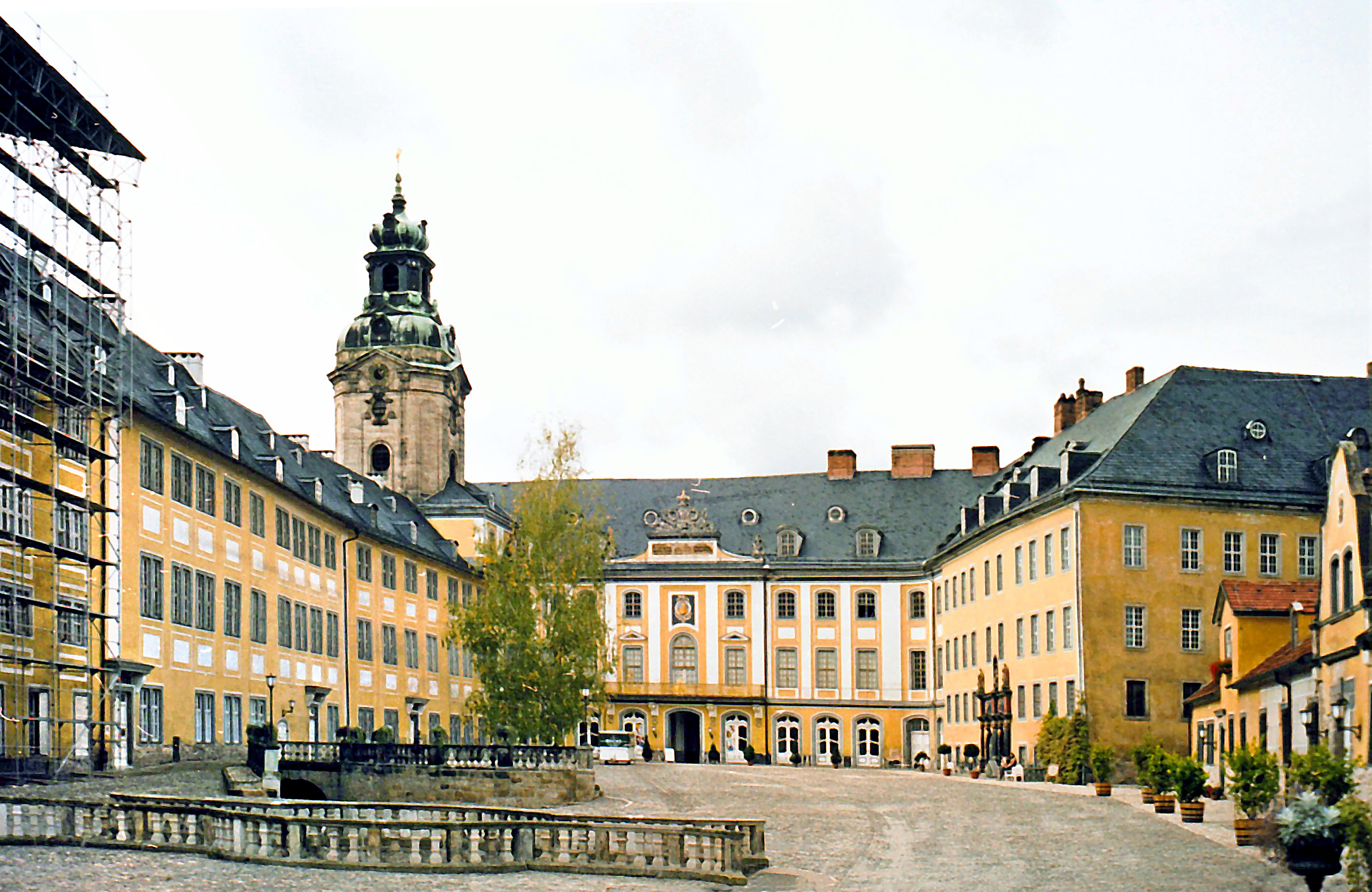
Heideckburg schloss, Rudolstadt

Friedrich Günther, Prince of Schwarzburg-Rudolstadt (6 November 1793 – 28 June 1867) was a sovereign prince of Schwarzburg-Rudolstadt.

== Biography ==
He was born in Rudolstadt the second son of the reigning prince of Schwarzburg-Rudolstadt, Louis Frederick II and his wife Landgravine Caroline of Hesse-Homburg. His grandfather Friedrich Karl had died seven months before his birth and so he was born as heir apparent and Hereditary Prince. His father died on 28 April 1807 when he was thirteen so his mother acted as regent until he turned twenty one on 6 November 1814 when he assumed control of the principality.

His reign spanning sixty years saw the creation of the Landtag of Schwarzburg-Rudolstadt, which he introduced in 1816 during the early years of his personal reign. When he ascended the throne in 1807, Schwarzburg-Rudolstadt was a member of the Confederation of the Rhine which was dissolved in 1813 with the Treaty of Paris on 30 May 1814 declaring the independence of the former Confederation states with Prince Friedrich Günther becoming the ruler of an independent principality. In 1815 the German Confederation was created and Schwarzburg-Rudolstadt along with other German monarchies joining. The last years of his reign saw the Austro-Prussian War of 1866 where Prince Friedrich Günther kept Schwarzburg-Rudolstadt neutral and following the conclusion of the war the creation of the North German Confederation.

Following his death at Heidecksburg castle he was succeeded as prince by his brother Prince Albert as all of his sons by his first wife had predeceased him and his son by his second wife, Prince Sizzo of Leutenberg was born from a morganatic marriage.

== Marriages and children ==
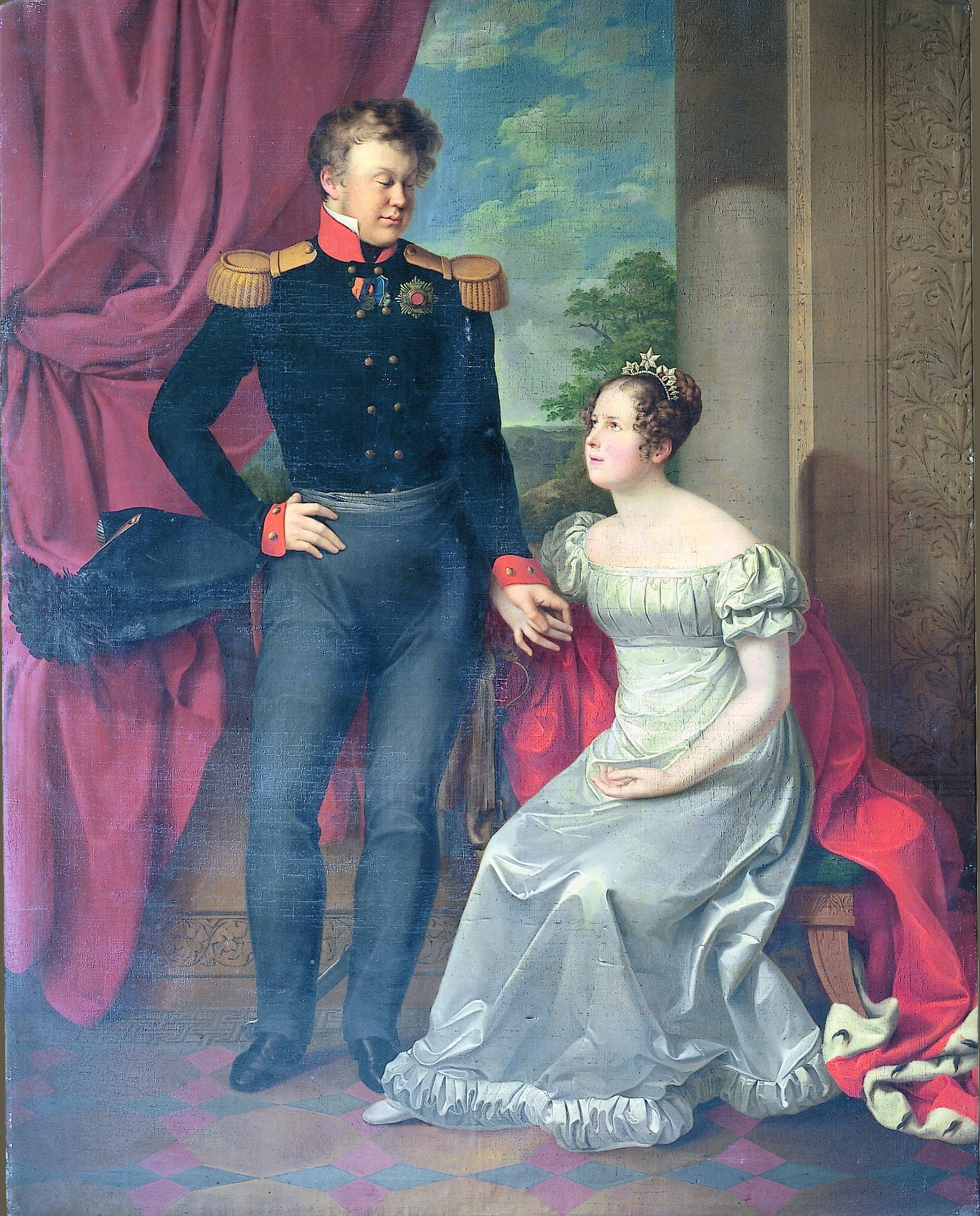
Portrait of Friedrich Günther with his first wife Auguste of Anhalt-Dessau by Johann Heinrich Beck, 1820

Prince Friedrich Günther was married three times:

His first wife was Princess Auguste of Anhalt-Dessau (1793–1854) whom he married on 15 April 1816 at Dessau. They had three children.

- Prince Friedrich Günther (1818–1821)
- Prince Günther (1821–1845)
- Prince Gustav (1828–1837)

He married secondly Countess Helene of Reina (1835–1860) on 7 August 1855 at Dresden. She was a daughter of Prince George Bernhard of Anhalt-Dessau in his second morganatic marriage, but she was adopted by her paternal uncle William on 1 April 1855 and assumed the title of "Princess of Anhalt"; however, this marriage was considered morganatic under the House Laws of the Schwarzburg family, and their children were created Prince and Princess of Leutenberg.

- Princess Helene (1860–1937), married Prince Johann Heinrich Friedrich August of Schoenaich-Carolath (1849-1910)
- Prince Sizzo (1860–1926)

His third wife was Marie Schultze (1840–1909) whom he married at Schwarzburg on 24 September 1861. This marriage was also morganatic and in 1864 he created the title Countess of Brockenburg for his wife. The marriage was childless.

In addition with his legitimate issue, from his relationship with Friederike Thorwart (13 March 1820 – 18 July 1884) he had three daughters, all of whom were legally accepted as offspring of Friedrich Macheleidt (Thorwart's husband since 1847) on 20 December 1858:

- Marie (b. Frankfurt am Main, 12 April 1843)
- Emma (b. Neuhaus nr. Coburg, 12 December 1846), married by 1884 N Graef, a teacher in Frankfurt am Main.
- Helene (b. Rudolstadt, 7 November 1848)

Friedrich Günther, Prince of Schwarzburg-Rudolstadt House of Schwarzburg-Rudolstadt Cadet branch of the House of Schwarzburg Born: 6 November 1793 Died: 28 June 1867
Regnal titles
Preceded by Louis Frederick II	Prince of Schwarzburg-Rudolstadt; 1807–1867	Succeeded by Albert
