= Free State of Schwarzburg-Rudolstadt =

German state (1918–1920)

Coordinates: 50°43′1″N 11°19′39″E

Free State of Schwarzburg-Rudolstadt Freistaat Schwarzburg-Rudolstadt
- 1918–1920
- Flag

- Schwarzburg-Rudolstadt within the German Empire

- Schwarzburg-Rudolstadt (in brown) within the Thuringian states
- Capital: Rudolstadt
- Government: Republic
- Historical era: Interwar era
  - German revolution of 1918–1919: 1918
  - Merged into Thuringia: 1920

Area
- 1919: 941 km^{2} (363 sq mi)

Population
  - 1919: 97,983
Preceded by	Succeeded by
Principality of Schwarzburg-Rudolstadt	Thuringia
- Today part of: Germany

The Free State of Schwarzburg-Rudolstadt (German: Freistaat Schwarzburg-Rudolstadt) was a small, short-lived (1918–1920) central German state during the early years of the Weimar Republic. It was formed following the dissolution of the Principality of Schwarzburg-Rudolstadt during the German revolution of 1918–1919. After Prince Günther Victor abdicated, Schwarzburg-Rudolstadt transitioned peacefully into a republic. It became part of Thuringia when it was created on 1 May 1920

== History ==
The Free State's predecessor, the Principality of Schwarzburg-Rudolstadt (1599–1918), became a member state of the North German Confederation in 1866 and of the German Empire in 1871. It was a hereditary monarchy with a single-chamber Landtag (state parliament). From 1909 to 1918, Prince Günther Victor ruled Schwarzburg-Rudolstadt and Schwarzburg-Sondershausen in personal union. The Principality had one seat each in the Empire's Reichstag and Bundesrat.

=== German revolution ===
The Principality of Schwarzburg-Rudolstadt collapsed during the revolution of 1918–1919 which brought down the German Empire and all of Germany's royal houses at the end of World War I. The revolution began in late October 1918 when rebellious sailors at Kiel set up a workers' and soldiers' council and in early November spread the revolt across the rest of Germany. Emperor Wilhelm II fled to Holland on 10 November, and councils quickly took power from the existing military, royal and civil authorities with little resistance or bloodshed.

On 15 November the leader of Rudolstadt's workers' and soldiers' council, Ernst Otto of the moderate Social Democratic Party (SPD), demanded in a session of the Landtag that the council be given legislative power and that the Prince abdicate. Günther Victor agreed to do so but only after the proper legal steps had been taken to ensure a peaceful transition to a republic, including financial compensation for the princely house.

=== The Free State ===
From that point, Schwarzburg-Rudolstadt's change from a parliamentary monarchy to a republic proceeded fully within constitutional bounds. The Landtag, which had last been elected before the war and had an SPD majority, passed the necessary legislation on 22 November. It stated in five short paragraphs that the Landtag would have legislative powers after the Prince's abdication and that the state ministry, which would be expanded by four ministers chosen by the Landtag from among its members, would have governmental authority. State and local administration was to remain in place without change. Details of the Prince's compensation followed in a separate set of bills also dated 22 November.

Prince Günther Victor abdicated for Schwarzburg-Rudolstadt on 23 November 1918 and for Schwarzburg-Sondershausen two days later.

On 8 December, the Landtag passed an election law that established universal (both women and men), equal, direct voting rights using proportional representation. Schwarzburg-Rudolstadt's first and only Landtag election took place on 9 March 1919. The SPD won an absolute majority with 54% of the votes and 11 of 17 seats. The liberal German Democratic Party (DDP) came in second, with 15% of the votes and 3 seats. A new ministry was formed under the leadership of Emil Hartmann of the SPD.

=== Merger into Thuringia ===
In late March 1919, representatives of the eight Thuringian states had met in Weimar to begin discussing plans to form a unified state. All except Coburg, which chose to become part of Bavaria, signed the “Community Agreement on the Merger of the Thuringian States” on 4 January 1920. Both houses of the Weimar Republic's parliament subsequently passed a federal law officially creating the State of Thuringia with its capital at Weimar.

With the founding of Thuringia on 1 May 1920, the Free State of Schwarzburg-Rudolstadt formally ceased to exist as a federal state. The "Law on the Administration of the Former Thuringian States During the Transition Period" of 9 December 1920 handled the long process of reshaping the internal configuration of Thuringia's local and regional government bodies.
