= Louis Frederick II of Schwarzburg-Rudolstadt =

Louis Frederick II
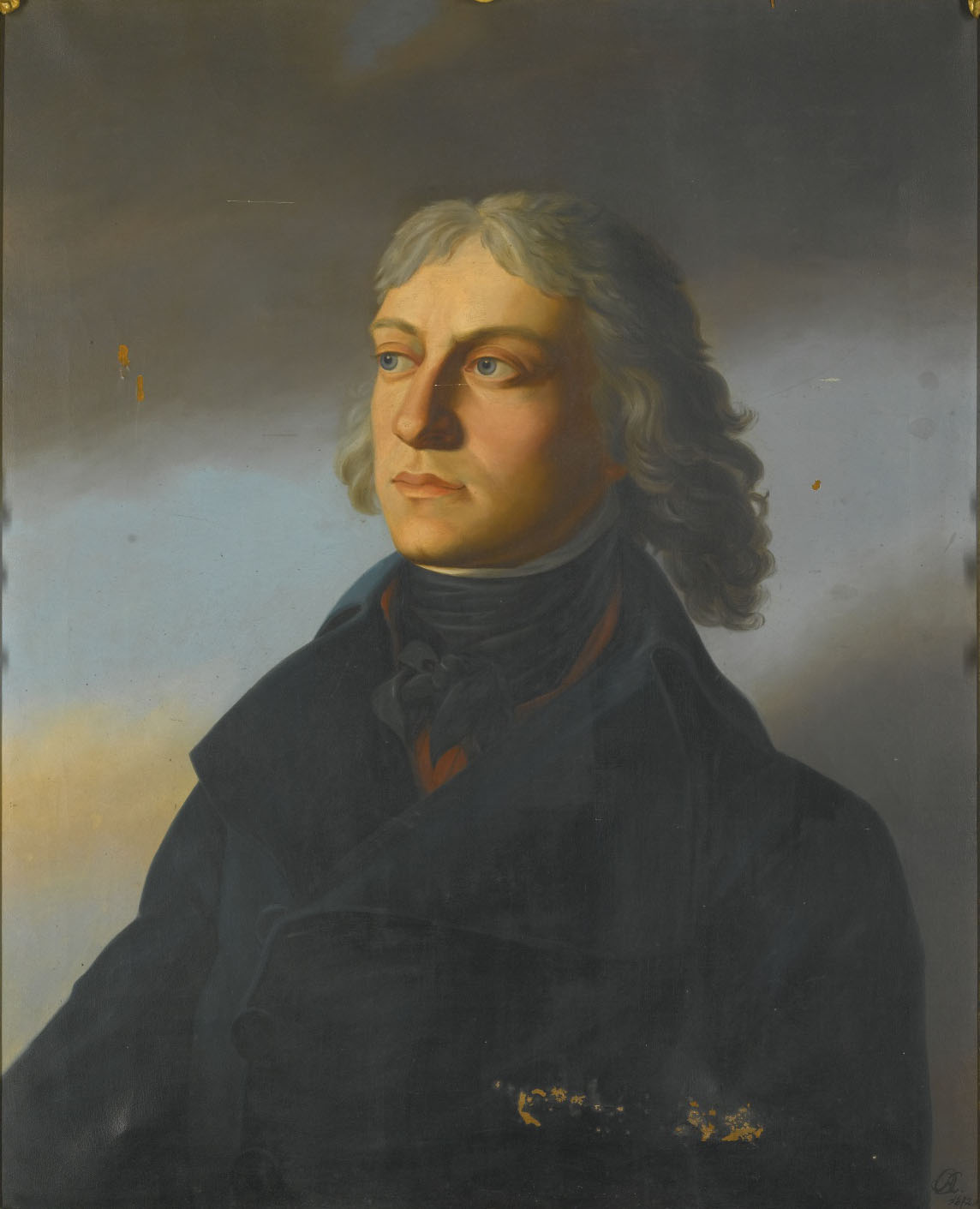

Prince of Schwarzburg-Rudolstadt
- Reign: 13 April 1793 – 28 April 1807
- Predecessor: Frederick Charles
- Successor: Friedrich Günther
- Born: 9 August 1767; Rudolstadt, Schwarzburg-Rudolstadt
- Died: 28 April 1807 (aged 39); Rudolstadt, Schwarzburg-Rudolstadt
- Spouse: Landgravine Caroline of Hesse-Homburg (m. 1791)
- Issue: Cäcilie of Schwarzburg-Rudolstadt; Friedrich Günther, Prince of Schwarzburg-Rudolstadt; Albert, Prince of Schwarzburg-Rudolstadt; Thekla of Schwarzburg-Rudolstadt; Caroline of Schwarzburg-Rudolstadt; Bernhard of Schwarzburg-Rudolstadt; Rudolph of Schwarzburg-Rudolstadt
- House: House of Schwarzburg-Rudolstadt
- Father: Frederick Charles, Prince of Schwarzburg-Rudolstadt
- Mother: Princess Auguste of Schwarzburg-Rudolstadt

Louis Frederick II, Prince of Schwarzburg-Rudolstadt (Rudolstadt, 9 August 1767 – Rudolstadt, 28 April 1807) was reigning Prince of Schwarzburg-Rudolstadt from 1793 to 1807.

== Life ==
Louis Frederick was born on 9 August 1767 in Rudolstadt and was the second child and first son of the then Hereditary Prince Frederick Charles of Schwarzburg-Rudolstadt and his first wife Princess Auguste of Schwarzburg-Rudolstadt. At that time his grandfather Louis Günther II was ruling over the principality. In 1789 Louis Frederick and his brother Karl Günther went to Geneva and other destinations for their education. During this journey they learned about the events of the French Revolution.

On July 21, 1791 in Homburg he married Caroline of Hesse-Homburg, daughter of Frederick V, Landgrave of Hesse-Homburg.

== Issue ==
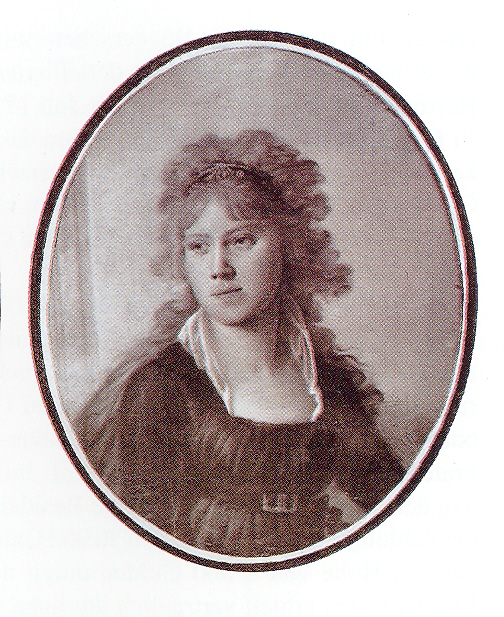
Caroline, Princess of Schwarzburg-Rudolstadt

From the marriage of the Prince with Caroline were born the following children:

- Princess Carolina Augusta of Schwarzburg-Rudolstadt (1792–1794)
- Friedrich Günther (1793–1867), Prince of Schwarzburg-Rudolstadt

∞ 1. 1816 Princess Auguste of Anhalt-Dessau (1793–1854),
∞ 2. 1855 Princess Helena von Anhalt-Dessau (1835–1860),
∞ 3. 1861 Lydia Maria Schultze (1840–1909),

- Princess Thekla of Schwarzburg-Rudolstadt (1795–1861),

∞ 1817 Otto Victor, Prince of Schönburg-Waldenburg (1785–1859),

- Princess Caroline of Schwarzburg-Rudolstadt (*/† 1796),
- Albert (1798–1869), Prince of Schwarzburg-Rudolstadt

∞ 1827 Princess Auguste Luise of Solms-Braunfels (1804–1865),

- Prince Bernhard of Schwarzburg-Rudolstadt (1801–1816),
- Prince Rudolf of Schwarzburg-Rudolstadt (1801–1808).

== Bibliography ==
- Heinrich Friedrich Theodor Apfelstedt: Das Haus Kevernburg-Schwarzburg von seinem Ursprunge bis auf unsere Zeit: dargestellt in den Stammtafeln seiner Haupt- und Nebenlinien und mit biographischen Notizen über die wichtigsten Glieder derselben, Bertram, Sondershausen 1890, ISBN 3-910132-29-4
- Jens Henkel, Lutz Unbehaun, Frank Esche, Horst Fleischer: Die Fürsten von Schwarzburg-Rudolstadt, (Broschiert - 1997)
- Johann Christian August Junghans: Geschichte der schwarzburgischen Regenten, Leipzig 1821 E-Text
- Heinrich Schöppl: Die Regenten des Fürstentums Schwarzburg-Rudolstadt, Rudolstadt 1915.

Louis Frederick II of Schwarzburg-Rudolstadt House of Schwarzburg Born: 9 August 1767 Died: 28 April 1807
Preceded by Frederick Charles	Prince of Schwarzburg-Rudolstadt; 1793-1807	Succeeded by Frederick Günther
