= Günther Victor, Prince of Schwarzburg =

Günther Victor
- Prince of Schwarzburg
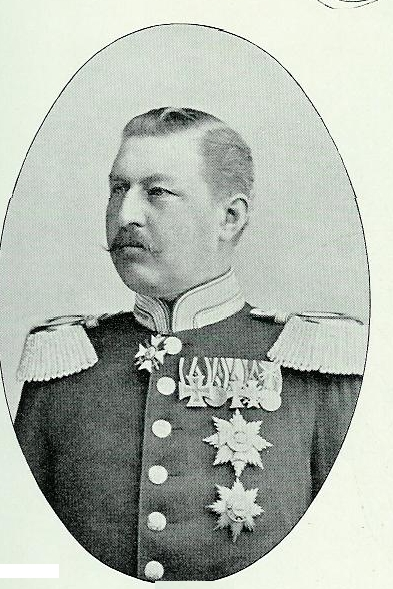
- Günther Victor in 1898

Prince of Schwarzburg-Rudolstadt
- Reign: 19 January 1890 – 22 November 1918
- Predecessor: George Albert
- Successor: Monarchy abolished

Prince of Schwarzburg-Sondershausen
- Reign: 28 March 1909 – 22 November 1918
- Predecessor: Charles Gonthier
- Successor: Monarchy abolished
- Born: 21 August 1852; Rudolstadt, Schwarzburg-Rudolstadt
- Died: 21 April 1925 (aged 72); Sondershausen, Weimar Republic
- Spouse: Princess Anna Louise of Schönburg-Waldenburg (m. 1891)
- House: House of Schwarzburg
- Father: Prince Adolf of Schwarzburg-Rudolstadt
- Mother: Princess Mathilde of Schönburg-Waldenburg

Günther Victor (21 August 1852 – 16 April 1925) was the final sovereign prince of Schwarzburg-Rudolstadt and Schwarzburg-Sondershausen.

== Biography ==
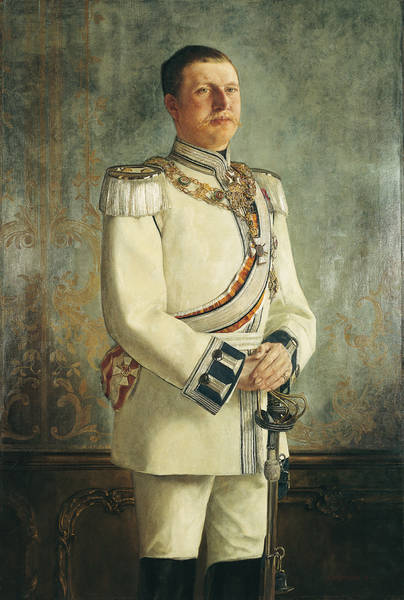
Portrait of Günther Victor

Günther Victor was born in Rudolstadt, the son of Prince Adolf of Schwarzburg-Rudolstadt and Princess Mathilde of Schönburg-Waldenburg. His mother was the daughter of Otto Victor, Prince of Schönburg-Waldenburg, and Princess Thekla of Schwarzburg-Rudolstadt, a cousin of Günther's father.

Upon the death of his father on 1 July 1875, Prince Günther became the heir presumptive to the principality of Schwarzburg-Rudolstadt. He succeeded his first cousin once removed, Prince Georg, as sovereign prince on 19 January 1890.

Following the death of Prince Leopold of Schwarzburg-Sondershausen in 1906, Günther became heir presumptive to the neighboring Schwarzburg principality. The death of Karl Günther on 28 March 1909 united the two principalities under Günther in a personal union. This marked the first time the two territories had been ruled by a single monarch since their 16th-century partition. Following this union, he dropped "Rudolstadt" from his title to become the Prince of Schwarzburg.

=== Post-monarchy and death ===
Following the outbreak of the German Revolution, Prince Günther was the last of the German federal monarchs to abdicate, resigning his throne on 22 November 1918. After the abolition of the monarchy, he entered into a settlement with the Free State of Schwarzburg-Rudolstadt regarding his ancestral assets.

He died in Sondershausen on 16 April 1925. As his marriage to Princess Anna Louise of Schönburg-Waldenburg was childless, he was succeeded as head of the House of Schwarzburg by his cousin, Sizzo, Prince of Schwarzburg.

== Marriage ==
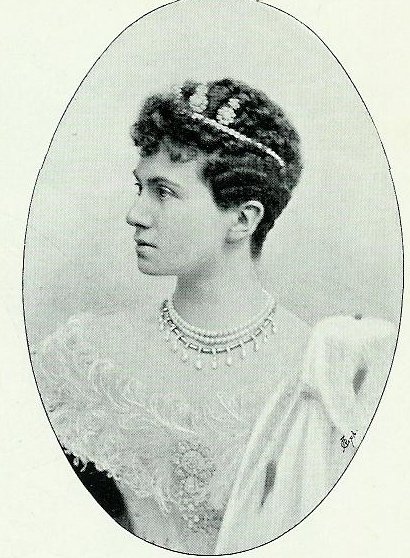
Princess Anna Louise, who died in 1951 as a citizen of the GDR

Prince Günther was married to Princess Anna Louise of Schönburg-Waldenburg at Rudolstadt on 9 December 1891. She was daughter of his uncle Prince Georg of Schönburg-Waldenburg and Princess Luise of Bentheim-Tecklenburg. The marriage was childless.

In 1942 Princess Anna Luise adopted her nephew Prince Wilhelm of Schönburg-Waldenburg and his son Prince Ulrich.

Günther Victor, Prince of Schwarzburg House of Schwarzburg Born: 21 August 1852 Died: 16 April 1925
Regnal titles
Preceded by George Albert	Prince of Schwarzburg-Rudolstadt; 1890–1918	Monarchies abolished
Preceded by Karl Günther	Prince of Schwarzburg-Sondershausen; 1909–1918	Monarchies abolished
Titles in pretence
Monarchies abolished	— TITULAR — Prince of Schwarzburg-Rudolstadt; Prince of Schwarzburg-Sondershausen; 1918–1925	Succeeded by Sizzo
