= Schwarzburg-Rudolstadt =

Historic state of Germany

County of Schwarzburg-Rudolstadt (1599–1711) Grafschaft Schwarzburg-Rudolstadt Principality of Schwarzburg-Rudolstadt (1711–1918) Fürstentum Schwarzburg-Rudolstadt
- 1599–1918
- Flag Coat of arms

- Schwarzburg-Rudolstadt within the German Empire

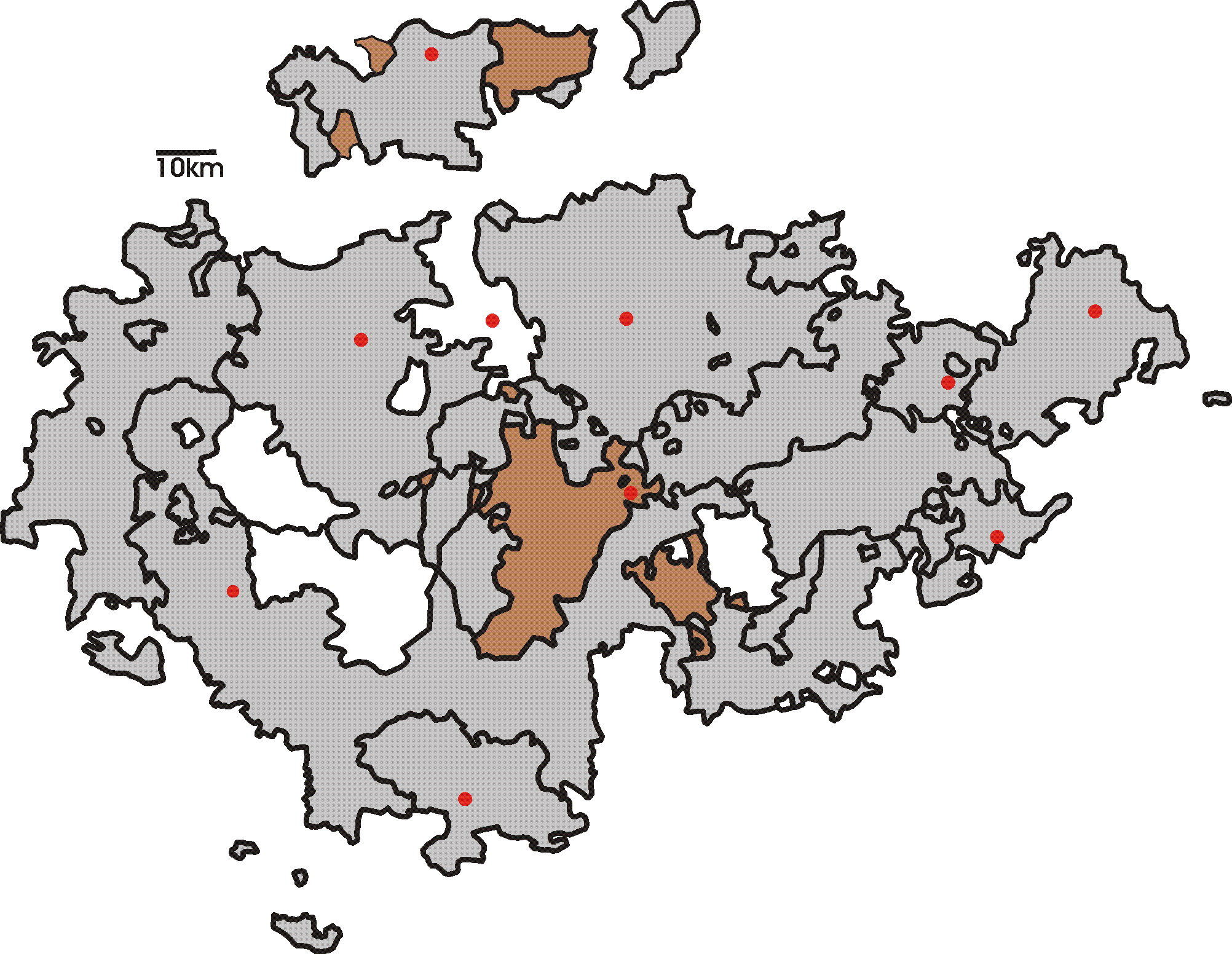
- Status: State of the Holy Roman Empire (until 1806), State of the Confederation of the Rhine, State of the German Confederation, State of the North German Confederation, State of the German Empire, State of the Weimar Republic
- Capital: Rudolstadt
- Government: Principality
- Prince
  - 1710–1718: Louis Frederick I (first)
  - 1890–1918: Günther Victor (last)
- Legislature: Landtag
- Historical era: Early modern period
  - Emerged from Schwarzburg: 1599
  - Raised to Principality: 1711
  - German Revolution: 1918
  - Merged into Thuringia: 1920

Population
  - 1835: 58,000
  - 1848: 62,000
Preceded by	Succeeded by
County of Schwarzburg	Free State of Schwarzburg-Rudolstadt
- Today part of: Germany

Schwarzburg-Rudolstadt was a small historic state (1599–1918) in present-day Thuringia, Germany, with its capital at Rudolstadt.

== History ==
Schwarzburg-Rudolstadt was established in 1599 in the course of a restructuring of Schwarzburg dynasty lands. The ancestral seat of the comital family was the 11th-century Schwarzburg Castle, although in 1571 the seat moved to the larger town of Rudolstadt. In 1583 Count Günther XLI of Schwarzburg, the eldest son of Günther XL the Rich and ruler over the united Schwarzburg lands, died without issue. He was succeeded by his younger brothers, with Albert VII receiving the territory around Rudolstadt. After their brother William I, Count of Schwarzburg-Frankenhausen died in 1597, the surviving brothers Albert VII and John Günther I established the two counties of Schwarzburg-Rudolstadt and Schwarzburg-Sondershausen by the 1599 Treaty of Stadtilm.

Albert's descendants ruled as sovereign counts of the Holy Roman Empire. Count Albert Anton (1662–1710) was elevated to the rank of a prince by Emperor Leopold I; it was however his son Louis Frederick I (1710–1718) who first bore the princely title, whereby Schwarzburg-Rudolstadt in 1711 became a principality under the same entity. It withstood mediatisation and after the empire's dissolution joined the Confederation of the Rhine in 1807 and the German Confederation in 1815.

In 1905 Schwarzburg-Rudolstadt had an area of 940 km^{2} (360 sq mi) and a population of 97,000.

On 23 November 1918, during the German Revolution of 1918–1919 and the fall of all the German monarchies, Prince Günther Victor was the last to abdicate. The former principality became the Free State of Schwarzburg-Rudolstadt in 1919 and joined the Weimar Republic as a constituent state. In 1920, it joined with other small states in the area to form the new state of Thuringia.

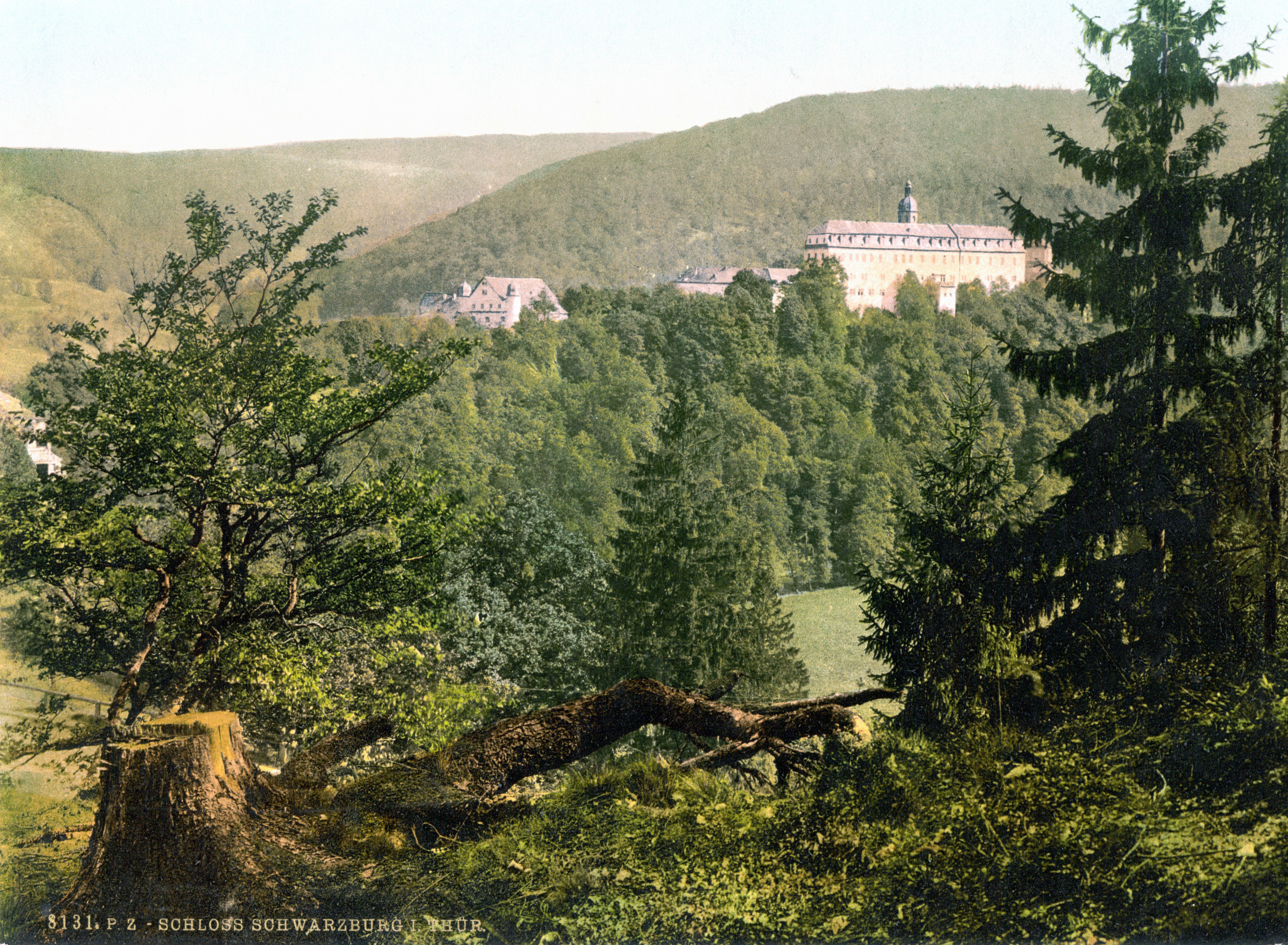
The castle at Schwarzburg

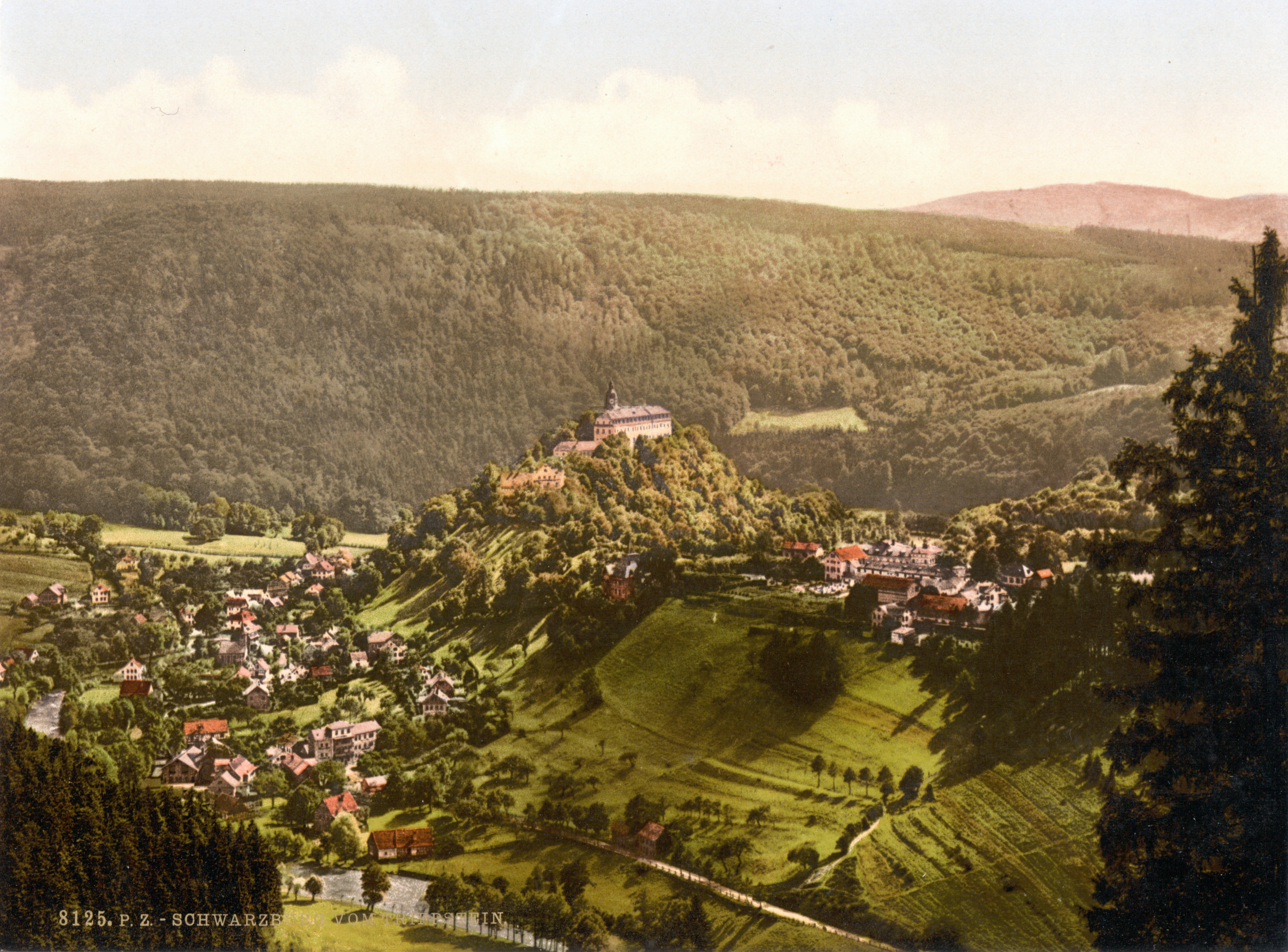
Aerial view of Schwarzburg

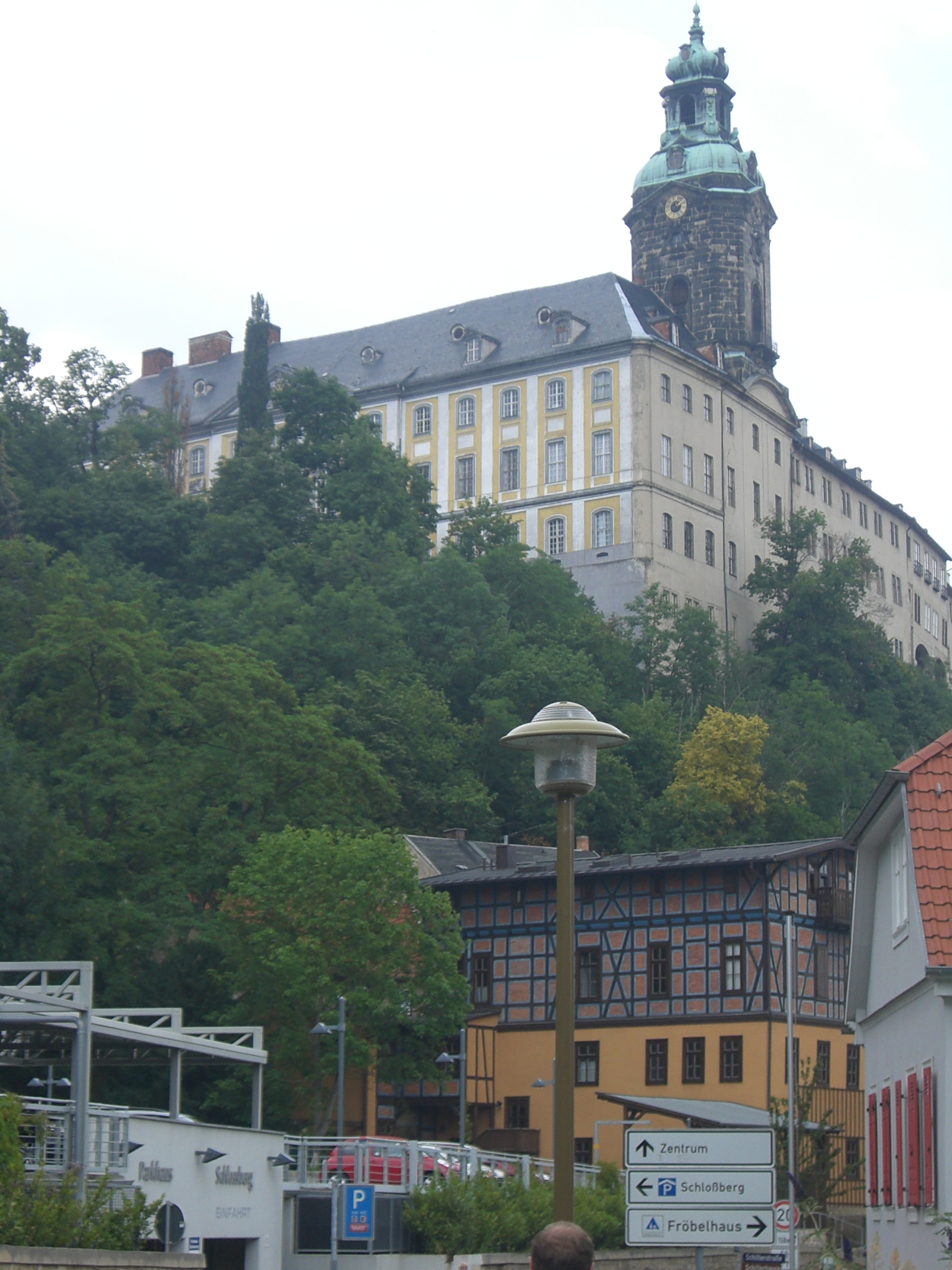
Heidecksburg residence at Rudolstadt

== Rulers of Schwarzburg-Rudolstadt ==
=== Counts of Schwarzburg-Rudolstadt ===
- 1574–1605: Count Albrecht VII (1537–1605), son of Count Günther XL of Schwarzburg, founder of the county (state) of Schwarzburg-Rudolstadt
- 1605–1630: Count Charles Günther I (1576–1630), succeeded by younger brother Louis Günther I
- 1612–1634 Count Albrecht Günther (1582–1634)
- 1630–1646: Count Louis Günther I (1581–1646)
- 1646–1662: Regent Emilie of Oldenburg-Delmenhorst (1614–70)
- 1662–1710: Count Albert Anton (1641–1710)

=== Princes of Schwarzburg-Rudolstadt ===
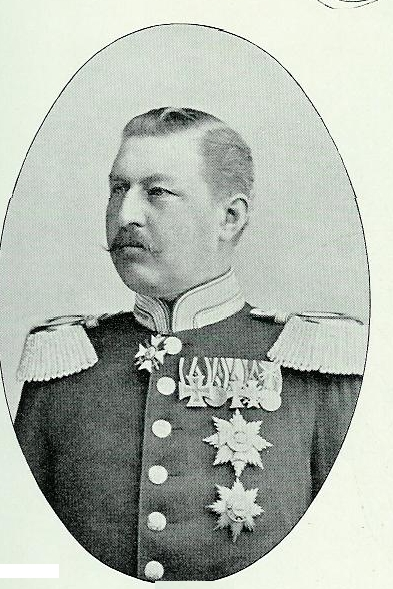
Prince Günther Victor, the last ruler of Schwarzburg-Rudolstadt

- 1710–1718: Prince Louis Frederick I (1667–1718)
- 1718–1744: Prince Frederick Anton (1692–1744)
- 1744–1767: Prince John Frederick (1721–67)
- 1767–1790: Prince Louis Günther II (1708–90)
- 1790–1793: Prince Frederick Charles (1736–93)
- 1793–1807: Prince Louis Frederick II (1767–1807)
- 1807–1814: Regent Caroline Louise of Hesse-Homburg (1771–1854)
- 1814–1867: Prince Frederick Günther (1793–1867)
- 1867–1869: Prince Albert (1798–1869)
- 1869–1890: Prince Georg Albert (1838–90)
- 1890–1918: Prince Günther Victor (1852–1925), also succeeded as Prince of Schwarzburg-Sondershausen in 1909 upon the death of Prince Karl Günther.

== See also ==
- House of Schwarzburg
