= Lippe State Library at Detmold =

Coordinates: 51°55′49″N 8°52′54″E

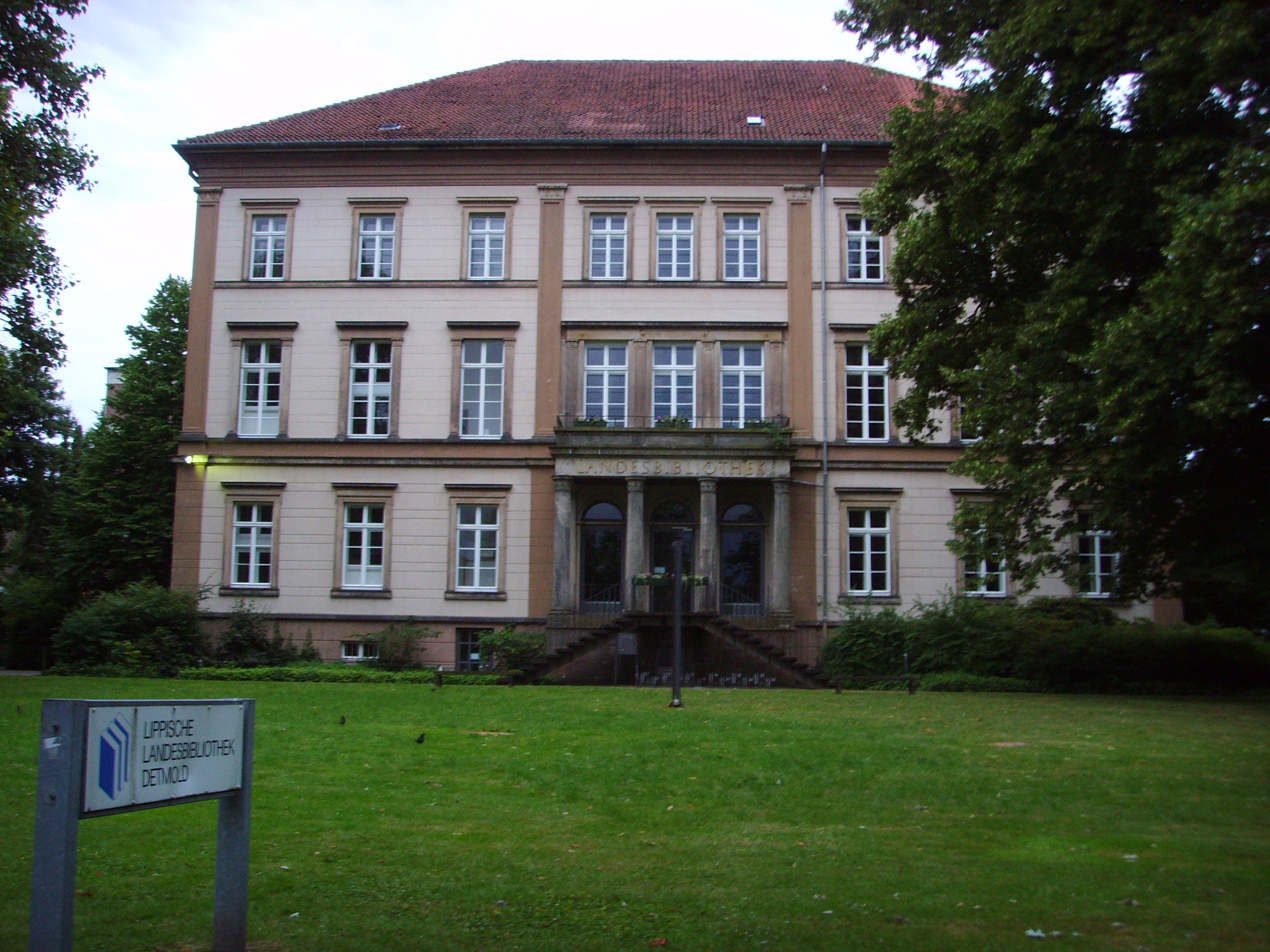

Lippe State Library (Lippische Landesbibliothek Detmold) is the universal and regional library for Ostwestfalen-Lippe in Germany. It is based at Detmold.
