= Princess Caroline of Hesse-Homburg =

Caroline of Hesse-Homburg
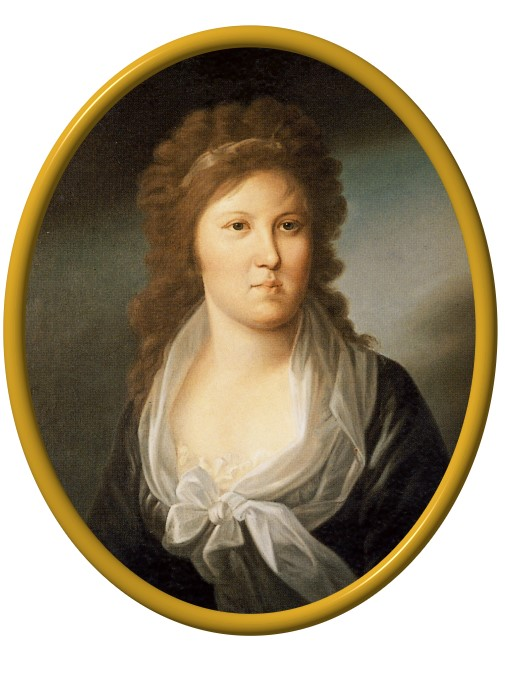

Princess consort of Schwarzburg-Rudolstadt
- Tenure: 13 April 1793 - 28 April 1807
- Born: 25 August 1771; Homburg, Hochtaunuskreis, Hesse-Darmstadt, Germany
- Died: 20 June 1854 (aged 82); Rudolstadt, Saalfeld-Rudolstadt, Thuringia, Germany
- Spouse: Louis Frederick II, Prince of Schwarzburg-Rudolstadt (m. 1791; died 1807)
- Issue: Cäcilie of Schwarzburg-Rudolstadt; Friedrich Günther, Prince of Schwarzburg-Rudolstadt; Albert, Prince of Schwarzburg-Rudolstadt; Thekla of Schwarzburg-Rudolstadt; Caroline of Schwarzburg-Rudolstadt; Bernhard of Schwarzburg-Rudolstadt; Rudolph of Schwarzburg-Rudolstadt
Names
- Ulrike Louise Caroline
- Father: Frederick V, Landgrave of Hesse-Homburg
- Mother: Caroline of Hesse-Darmstadt

Caroline of Hesse-Homburg (25 August 1771 – 20 June 1854) was a Princess regent of Schwarzburg-Rudolstadt between 1807 and 1814.

== Life ==
She was the daughter of Frederick V, Landgrave of Hesse-Homburg and his wife, Caroline of Hesse-Darmstadt. She married in 1791 to Louis Frederick II, Prince of Schwarzburg-Rudolstadt. They had seven children together.

She was regent of Schwarzburg-Rudolstadt during the minority of her son Friedrich Günther, Prince of Schwarzburg-Rudolstadt.

Caroline died on 20 June 1854.

== Children ==
Name	Birth	Death	Notes
Cäcilie of Schwarzburg-Rudolstadt	17 July 1792	4 March 1794	died in infancy
Friedrich Günther, Prince of Schwarzburg-Rudolstadt	6 November 1793	28 June 1867	married 1) Princess Auguste of Anhalt-Dessau, issue 2) Countess Helene of Reina, issue 3) Marie Schultze
Thekla of Schwarzburg-Rudolstadt	23 February 1795	4 January 1861	married Otto Victor, Prince of Schönburg-Waldenburg, issue
Caroline of Schwarzburg-Rudolstadt	7 November 1796	18 December 1796	died in infancy
Albert, Prince of Schwarzburg-Rudolstadt	30 April 1798	26 November 1869	married Princess Augusta of Solms-Braunfels
Bernhard of Schwarzburg-Rudolstadt	23 June 1801	26 January 1816	died young
Rudolph of Schwarzburg-Rudolstadt	23 June 1801	21 July 1808	died in infancy

== Ancestry ==
Ancestors of Princess Caroline of Hesse-Homburg

16. Frederick II, Landgrave of Hesse-Homburg
8. Landgrave Casimir Wilhelm of Hesse-Homburg
17. Princess Luise Elisabeth of Kurland
4. Frederick IV, Landgrave of Hesse-Homburg
18. Wilhelm Moritz, Count of Solms-Braunfels
9. Christine Charlotte of Solms-Braunfels
19. Magdalene Sophie of Hesse-Homburg
2. Frederick V, Landgrave of Hesse-Homburg
20. Wilhelm Moritz, Count of Solms-Braunfels (= 18)
10. Friedrich Wilhelm, Prince of Solms-Braunfels
21. Madeleine Sophie of Hesse-Homburg (=19)
5. Ulrike Louise of Solms-Braunfels
22. Karl Otto, Count of Solms-Laubach-Utphe and Tecklenburg
11. Sophie Magdalene Benigna of Solms-Laubach-Utphe
23. Countess Louise of Schönburg-Waldenburg
1. Caroline of Hesse-Homburg
24. Ernest Louis, Landgrave of Hesse-Darmstadt
12. Louis VIII, Landgrave of Hesse-Darmstadt
25. Dorothea Charlotte of Brandenburg-Ansbach
6. Louis IX, Landgrave of Hesse-Darmstadt
26. Johann Reinhard III of Hanau-Lichtenberg
13. Charlotte Christine Magdalene Johanna of Hanau
27. Dorothea Friederike of Brandenburg-Ansbach
3. Caroline of Hesse-Darmstadt
28. Christian II, Count Palatine of Zweibrücken
14. Christian III, Count Palatine of Zweibrücken
29. Katharina Agathe of Rappoltstein
7. Countess Palatine Caroline of Zweibrücken
30. Louis Crato, Count of Nassau-Saarbrücken
15. Caroline of Nassau-Saarbrücken
31. Philippine Henriette of Hohenlohe
