= Heidecksburg =

Coordinates: 50.723°N 11.339°E

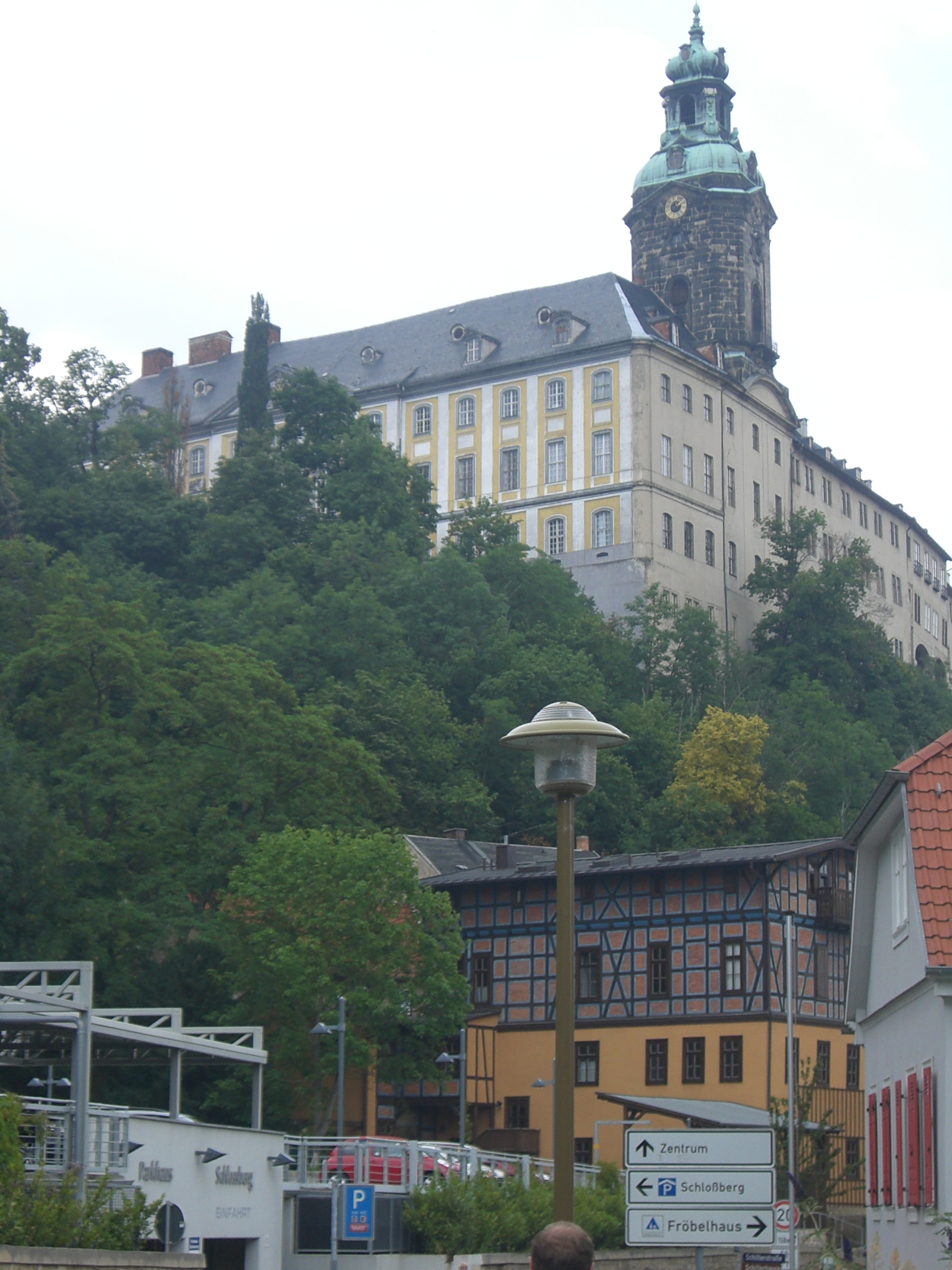
Heidecksburg, 2006

Heidecksburg is a Baroque palace in Rudolstadt, Thuringia, Germany. The palace served as the residence of the princes to Schwarzburg-Rudolstadt. It is located prominently approximately 60 m above the old town. After a fire in 1735 and its reconstruction, it has remained intact, including during World War II.

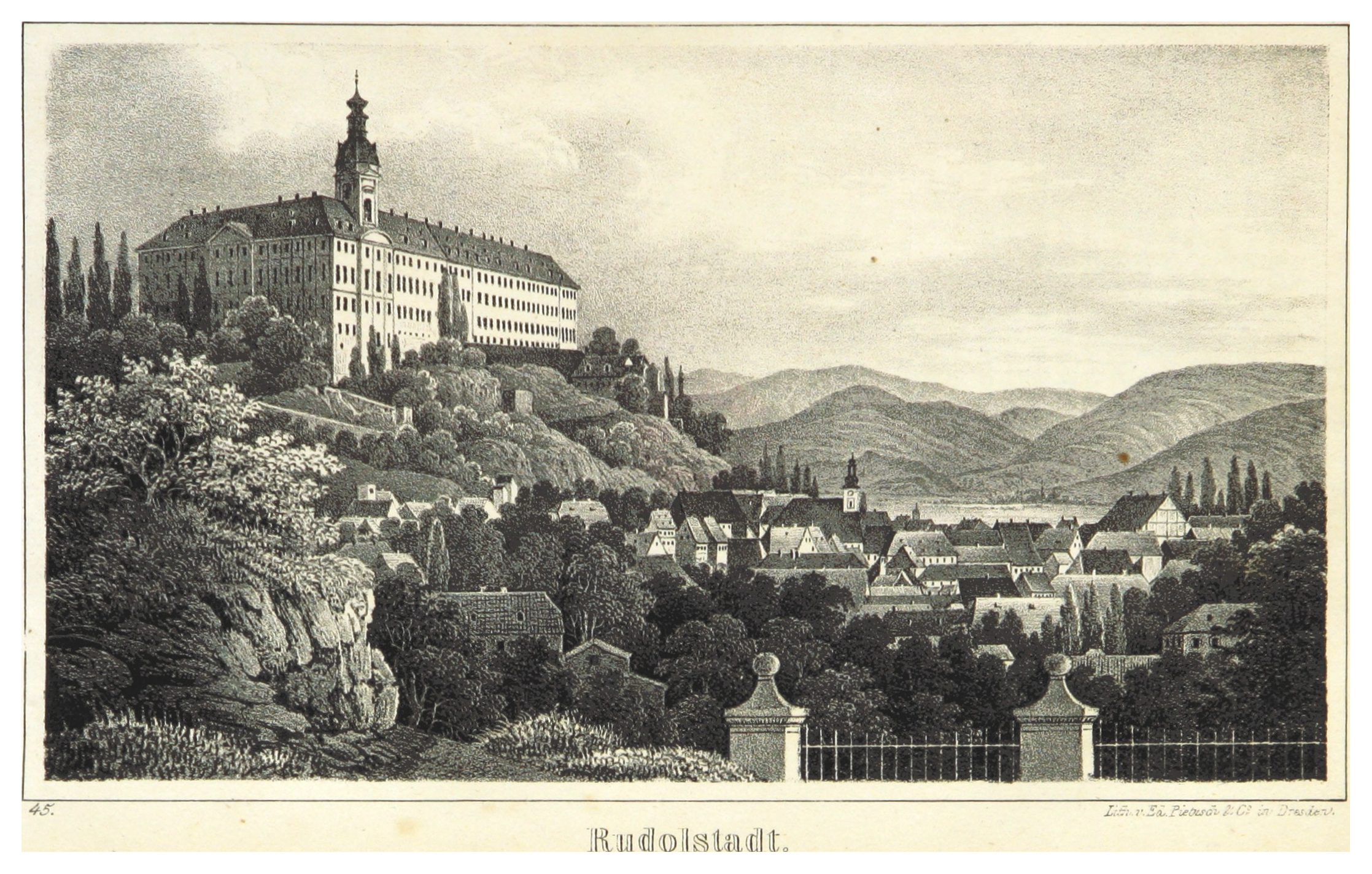
Heidecksburg, around 1841, after its baroque reconstruction
