= Ludmilla Elisabeth of Schwarzburg-Rudolstadt =

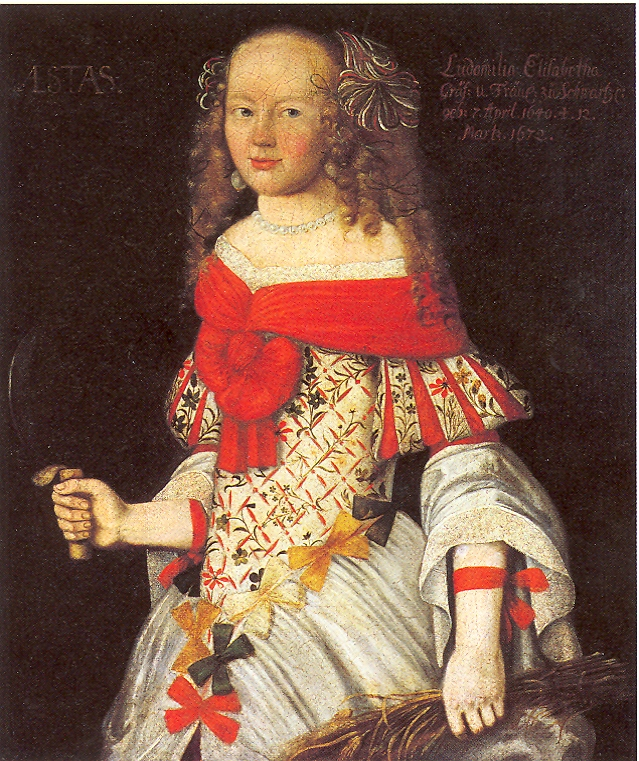
- Ludmilla Elisabeth of Schwarzburg-Rudolstadt
- Born: 7 April 1640
- Died: 12 March 1672 (aged 31); Rudolstadt
- Noble family: House of Schwarzburg
- Father: Louis Günther I, Count of Schwarzburg-Rudolstadt
- Mother: Emilie of Oldenburg-Delmenhorst

Ludmilla Elisabeth of Schwarzburg-Rudolstadt (also Ludomilla or Ludämilie; 7 April 1640 – 12 March 1672 in Rudolstadt) was a German noblewoman and a hymn poet. She was a Countess of Schwarzburg-Rudolstadt by birth.

== Life ==
Ludmilla Elizabeth was a daughter of Count Louis Günther I of Schwarzburg-Rudolstadt and his wife Countess Emilie of Oldenburg-Delmenhorst. Her father died in 1646 and she was raised in a strictly Protestant fashion by her mother.

Ludmilla had talents for the arts and sciences. She lived with her mother at Friedensburg Castle. Her sister-in-law Emilie Juliana inspired her to write hymns. She was also influenced by Ahasverus Fritsch, who later became the Chancellor of her brother Albert Anton.

After her mother died in 1670, Ludmilla and her three sisters moved to their brother's residence in Rudolstadt. In 1671, she was engaged to Count Christian William I of Schwarzburg-Sondershausen. However, before she could marry, Lumilla and two of her sisters died during a measles epidemic in 1672.

Her hymns were published in Rudolstadt in 1687 under the title Die Stimme der Freundin, d. i. Geistliche Lieder, welche aus brünstiger und biß ans Ende beharrter Jesusliebe verfertigt und gebraucht Weiland die Hochgebohrne Gräfin und Fräulein Ludämilia Elisabeth, Gräfin und Fräulein zu Schwartzburg und Hohensteins Christseligen Andenckens ("The voice of a friend, i.e. spiritual songs in memory of the Honourable Ludämilia Elizabeth, Countess of Schwarzburg and Baroness of Hohenstein, who fervently and persistently loved Jesus, her Saviour"). Her hymn "Jesus, Jesus, nichts als Jesu" was translated as "Jesus, Jesus, Only Jesus".
