= Sormitz =

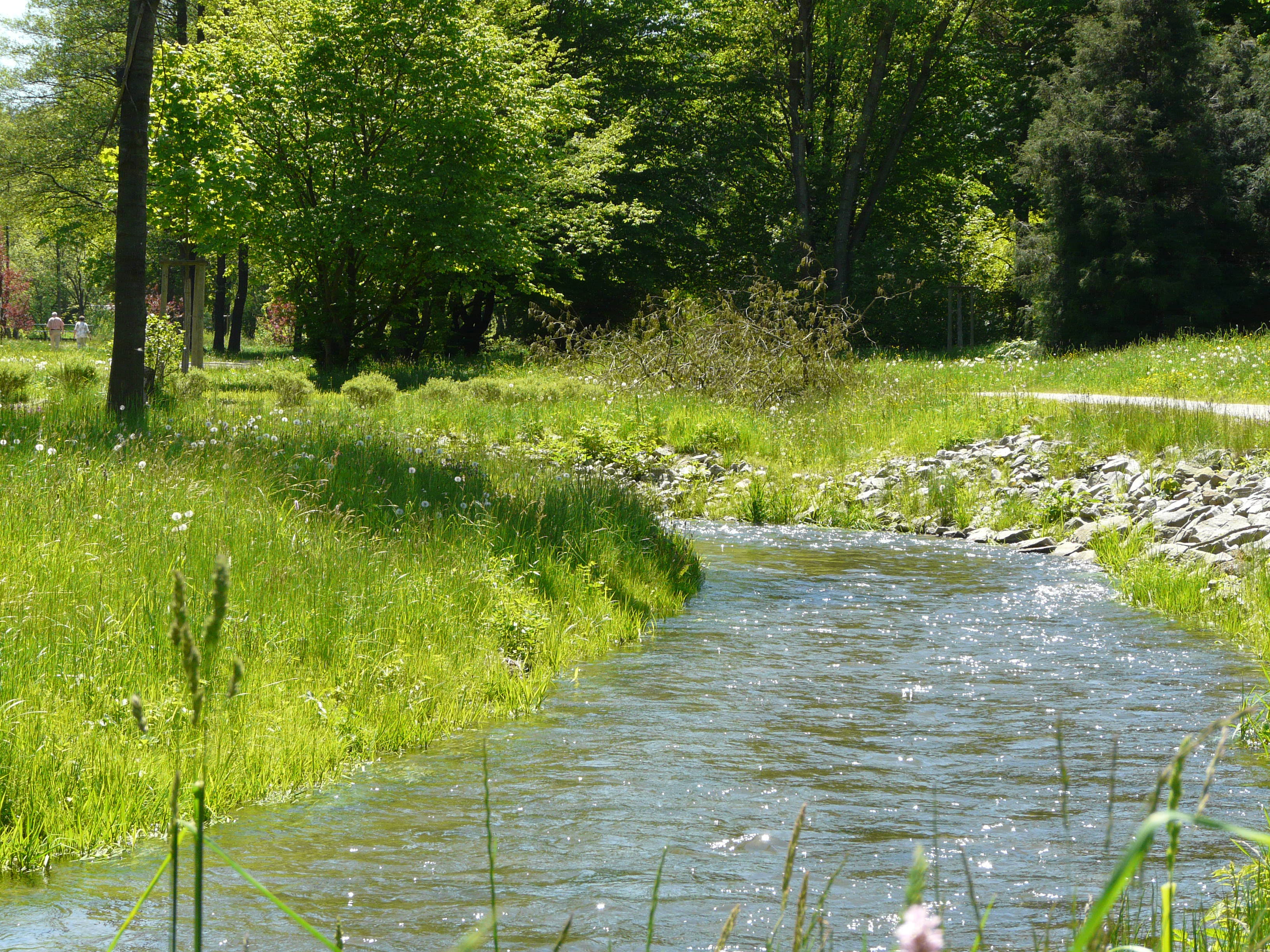
- Sormitz in the town park of Wurzbach

Location
- Country: Germany
- State: Thuringia

Physical characteristics
- Source
  - location: town park Wurzbach (Langwasser and Oßlabach)
- Mouth
  - location: in Hockeroda into Loquitz
  - coordinates: 50°35′43″N 11°25′58″E
- Length: 29.2 km (18.1 mi)

Basin features
- Progression: Loquitz→ Saale→ Elbe→ North Sea

The Sormitz is a tributary of the Loquitz in Thuringia, Germany and is 29.2 km in length.

Its origin is in the town park of Wurzbach where Langwasser and Oßlabach confluence. It enters the Loquitz in Hockeroda, which is in turn a tributary of the Saale.

== Naming ==
It is not possible to clarify to origin of the name. One assumption is the origin in Slavic Sb'rbica bzw. Sb'rbici (what means Sorbian stream).

== See also ==
- List of rivers of Thuringia
