= Emilie of Oldenburg-Delmenhorst =

Regent of Schwarzburg-Rudolstadt (1614–1670)

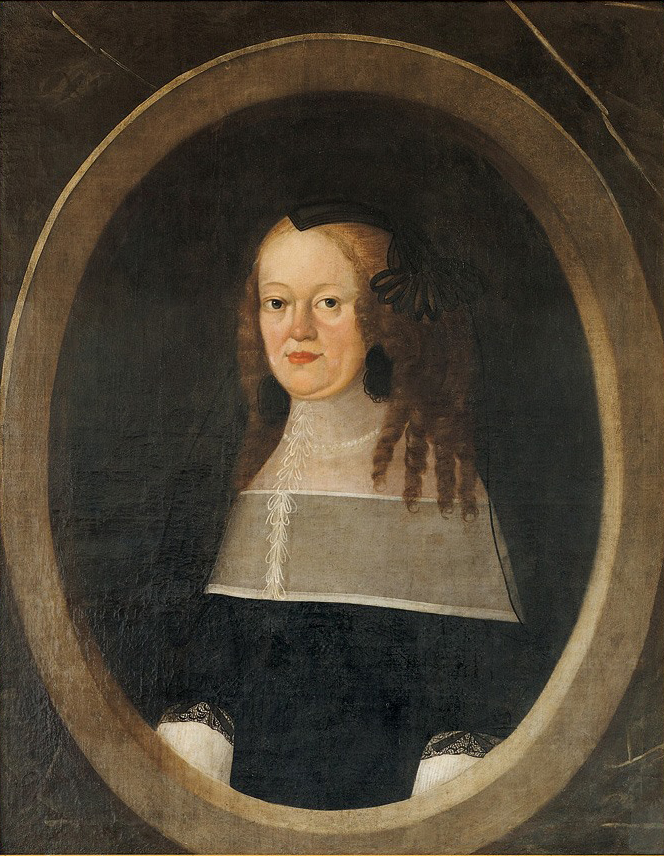
- Born: 15 June 1614; Delmenhorst
- Died: 4 December 1670 (aged 56); Rudolstadt
- Noble family: House of Oldenburg
- Spouse: Louis Günther I, Count of Schwarzburg-Rudolstadt
- Father: Anthony II, Count of Oldenburg
- Mother: Sibylle Elisabeth of Brunswick-Dannenberg

Emilie Antonia of Oldenburg-Delmenhorst (15 June 1614 in Delmenhorst – 4 December 1670 in Rudolstadt), was Princess consort of Schwarzburg-Rudolstadt, and then regent of Schwarzburg-Rudolstadt during the minority of her son Albert Anton from 1646 to 1662.

== Life ==
Emilie was the daughter of Count Anthony II of Oldenburg and his wife Sibylle Elisabeth of Brunswick-Dannenberg.

She married on 4 February 1638 to Count Louis Günther I of Schwarzburg-Rudolstadt.

When her husband died in 1646, she took up government as guardian and regent for her son, Albert Anton. She was 32 when she took up the regency, and ruled until her son came of age in 1662.

Emilie gave her children a religious education along the lines promoted by the Virtuous Society. She hired the author Ahasverus Fritsch to act as her Hofmeister. During her son's rule, Fritsch eventually rose to the post of Chancellor.

Emilie died on 4 December 1670 in Rudolstadt.

== Issue ==
From her marriage to Louis Günther I of Schwarzburg-Rudolstadt, the following children were born:

- Sophie Juliane (1639-1672)
- Ludmilla Elisabeth (1640-1672)
- Albert Anton (1641-1710)
- Christiane Magdalene (1642-1672)
- Maria Susanna (1646-1688)

== Ancestry ==
Ancestors of Emilie of Oldenburg-Delmenhorst

16. Gerhard VI, Count of Oldenburg
8. John V, Count of Oldenburg
17. Adelheid of Tecklenburg
4. Anthony I, Count of Oldenburg
18. George I, Prince of Anhalt-Dessau
9. Anna of Anhalt-Zerbst
19. Anna of Lindow-Ruppin
2. Anthony II, Count of Oldenburg
20. John V, Duke of Saxe-Lauenburg
10. Magnus I, Duke of Saxe-Lauenburg
21. Dorothea of Brandenburg
5. Sophie of Saxe-Lauenburg
22. Henry IV, Duke of Brunswick-Lüneburg
11. Catherine of Brunswick-Wolfenbüttel
23. Catherine of Pomerania
1. Emilie of Oldenburg-Delmenhorst
24. Henry I of Lüneburg
12. Ernest I, Duke of Brunswick-Lüneburg
25. Margarete of Saxony
6. Henry, Duke of Brunswick-Dannenberg
26. Henry V, Duke of Mecklenburg
13. Sophia of Mecklenburg
27. Ursula of Brandenburg
3. Sibylle Elisabeth of Brunswick-Dannenberg
28. Magnus I, Duke of Saxe-Lauenburg (= 10)
14. Francis I, Duke of Saxe-Lauenburg
29. Catherine of Brunswick-Wolfenbüttel (= 11)
7. Ursula of Saxe-Lauenburg
30. Henry IV, Duke of Saxony
15. Sibylle of Saxony
31. Catherine of Mecklenburg

== See also ==
- House of Schwarzburg
- Schwarzburg-Rudolstadt

Emilie of Oldenburg-Delmenhorst House of Oldenburg Born: 15 June 1614 Died: 3 December 1670
Preceded by Louis Günther I as Count	Regent of Schwarzburg-Rudolstadt; 1646-1662	Succeeded by Albert Anton as Count
