= Loquitz =

River in Germany

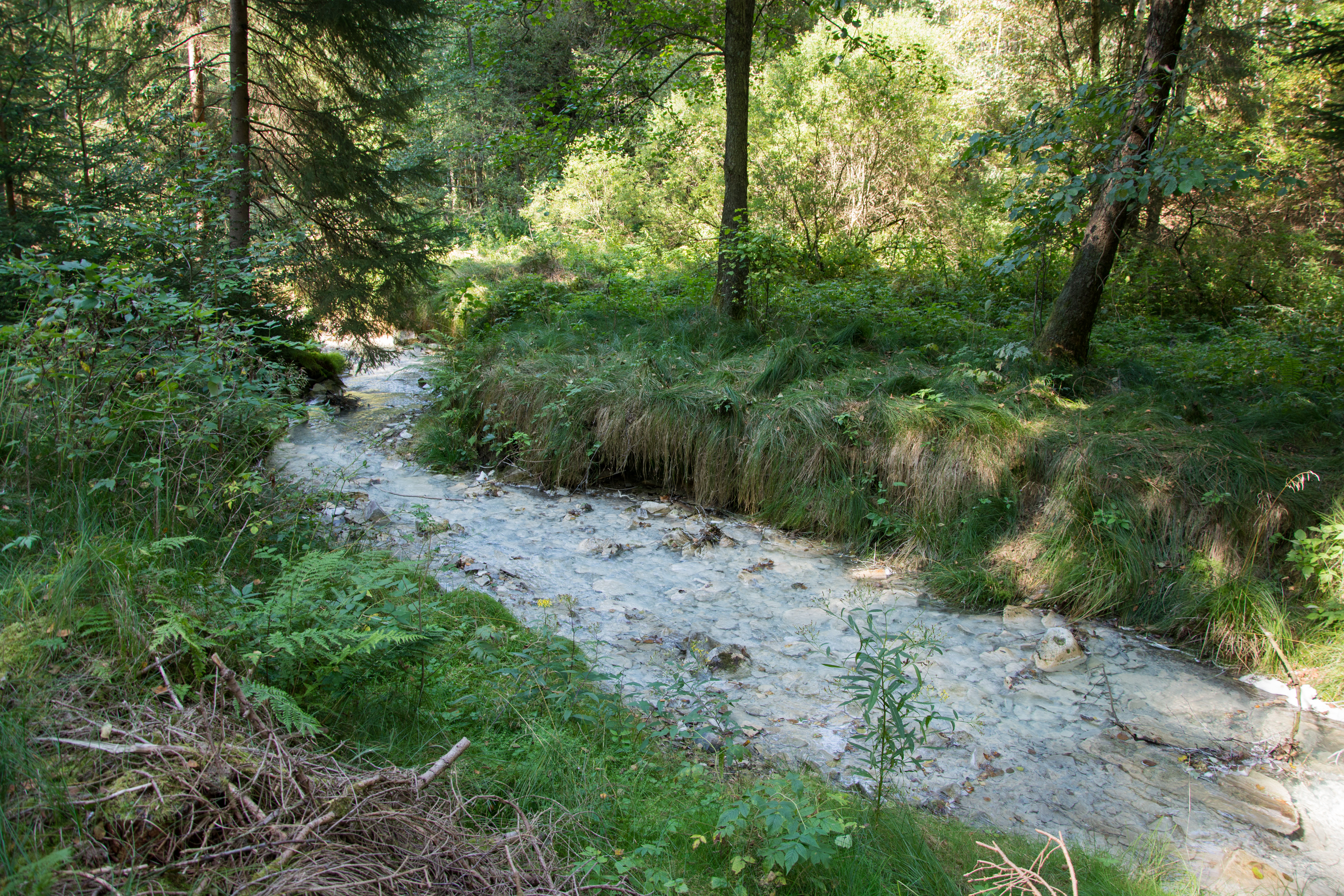
- The Loquitz at the border between Bavaria and Thuringia, about 3,5 km downstream from its source

Location
- Country: Germany
- States: Bavaria and Thuringia

Physical characteristics
- Mouth
  - location: Saale
  - coordinates: 50.6139°N 11.4349°E
- Length: 33.7 km (20.9 mi)
- Basin size: 368 km^{2} (142 sq mi)

Basin features
- Progression: Saale→ Elbe→ North Sea

The Loquitz is a river in Bavaria and Thuringia, Germany. It flows into the Saale in Kaulsdorf.

== See also ==
- List of rivers of Bavaria
- List of rivers of Thuringia
