= Louis Günther I of Schwarzburg-Rudolstadt =

Count of Schwarzburg-Rudolstadt

Louis Günther I, Count of Schwarzburg-Rudolstadt
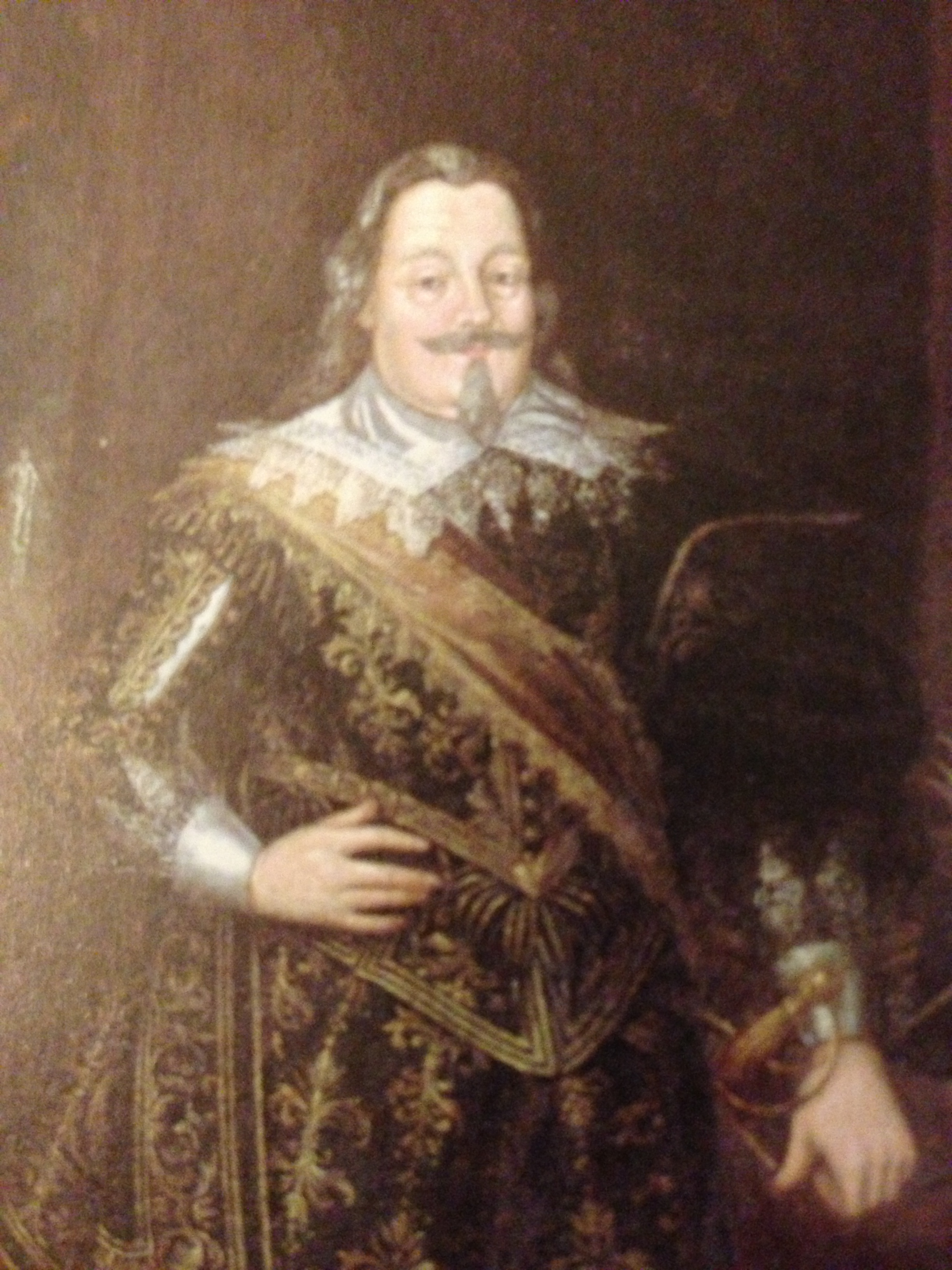
- Born: 27 June 1581; Rudolstadt
- Died: 4 November 1646 (aged 65); Rudolstadt
- Noble family: House of Schwarzburg
- Spouse: Emilie of Oldenburg-Delmenhorst
- Father: Albrecht VII, Count of Schwarzburg-Rudolstadt
- Mother: Juliana of Nassau-Dillenburg

Louis Günther I, Count of Schwarzburg-Rudolstadt (27 June 1581 in Rudolstadt – 4 November 1646 in Rudolstadt) was the ruling Count of Schwarzburg-Rudolstadt from 1612 until his death.

== Life ==
Louis Günther I was the son of Count Albrecht VII of Schwarzburg-Rudolstadt and his wife Juliana of Nassau-Dillenburg. His brothers were Charles Günther and Albert Günther. After Albrecht VII's death, they divided Schwarzburg-Rudolstadt among themselves, and each ruled a part of the county.

In 1598, Louis Günther went to Jena to study at university, and then moved to Strasbourg, where he met with people in the highest circles. After a trip to Paris, he returned to Rudolstadt in 1604. On 10 April 1605, Albrecht VII died and on 24 June the brothers agreed that the eldest brother, Charles Günther, would rule the county for the next six years.

This allowed Louis Günther to resume his journeys. In 1606, he returned to Strasbourg and then to Paris. In 1607, he visited Madrid, returned to Paris, then travelled to England and visited London, Oxford, Cambridge, and other places. On 10 February 1610, he finally returned to Rudolstadt.

On 8 September 1612, the three brothers agreed to divided the county. Charles Günther received a part which included the capital of Rudolstadt. Louis Günther received a part including the town of Frankenhausen. The part of Albert Günther included the towns of Stadtilm and Schwarzburg.

In 1624 in Erfurt, Louis Günther and Albert Günther agreed to swap their possessions. So Louis moved to his new residence in Stadtilm in 1625 and Albert Günther moved to Frankenhausen. Charles Günther continued to reside in Rudolstadt until he died without an heir in 1630. On 24 November 1631, Louis Günther and Albert Günther agreed on a new division, in which Louis Günther received Rudolstadt and Albert Günther received Blankenburg. In 1634, Albert Günther died without an heir, making Louis Günther the sole ruler.

On 5 September 1619, Louis Günther's sister-in-law Anna Sophie of Anhalt (Charles Günther's consort) founded the Virtuous Society, which was intended as a feminine counterpart to the Fruitbearing Society her brother Louis had founded. Louis Günther I joined the Fruitbearing Society under the nickname der Stärkende ("he who gets stronger") and his wife joined the Virtuous Society.

Louis Günther I carried out reforms in education and, as usual at the time, made some large donations to the churches. He found the church library, and left his private book collection to this library in his will. He promoted musical life by founding his own court orchestra. It was first mentioned in 1635, and evolved into the Thüringer Symphoniker Saalfeld-Rudolstadt, which still exists.

He died on 4 November 1646 in Rudolstadt. His widow ruled the county until 1667 as regent for their son Albert Anton, who was later elevated to Prince of Schwarzburg-Rudolstadt.

== Marriage and issue ==
On 4 November 1638, he married Emilie of Oldenburg-Delmenhorst. They had the following children:

- Sophie Juliane (1639–1672)
- Ludmilla Elisabeth (1640–1672)
- Albert Anton (1641–1710), the first Prince of Schwarzburg-Rudolstadt
- Christiane Magdalene (1642–1672)
- Maria Susanna (1646–1688)

== See also ==
- House of Schwarzburg
- Schwarzburg-Rudolstadt
