= Wurzbach =

- Town
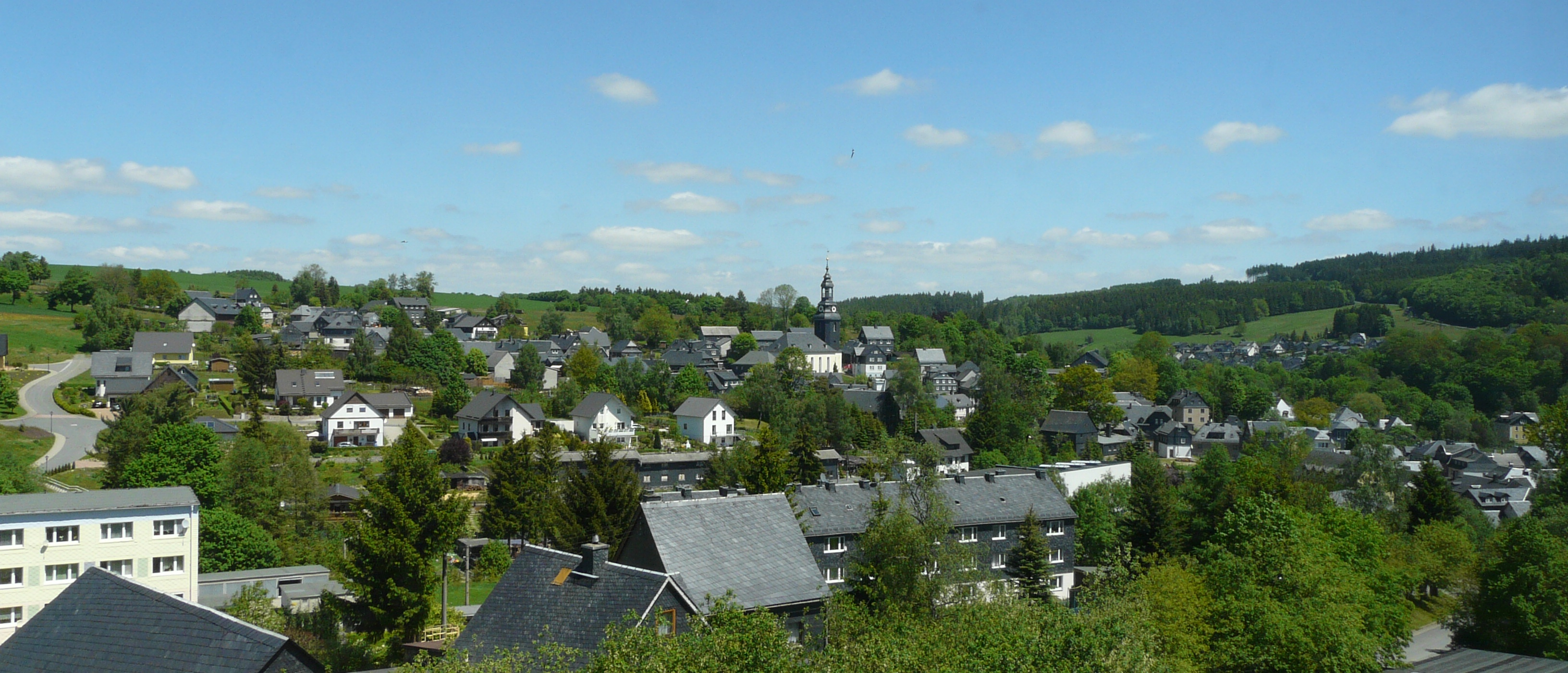

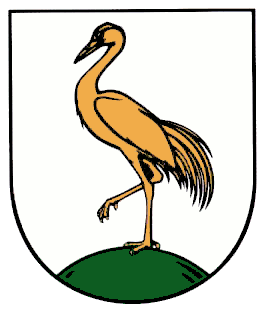
- Coat of arms

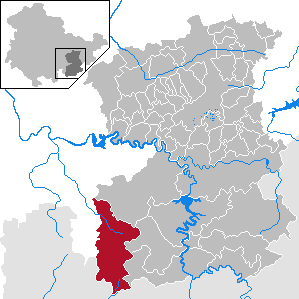
- Location of Wurzbach within Saale-Orla-Kreis district
- Interactive map of Wurzbach
- Location within Germany Location within Thuringia
- Coordinates: 50°27′50″N 11°32′12″E
- Country: Germany
- State: Thuringia
- District: Saale-Orla-Kreis
- Subdivisions: 7

Government
  - Mayor (2023–29): Guido Kant-von der Recke

Area
  - Total: 72.32 km^{2} (27.92 sq mi)
- Elevation: 525 m (1,722 ft)

Population (2025-12-31)
  - Total: 2,864
  - Density: 39.60/km^{2} (102.6/sq mi)
- Time zone: UTC+01:00 (CET)
  - Summer (DST): UTC+02:00 (CEST)
- Postal codes: 07343
- Dialling codes: 036652
- Vehicle registration: SOK
- Website: www.wurzbach.de

Wurzbach (German pronunciation: [ˈvʊʁt͡sˌbax]) is a town in the Saale-Orla-Kreis district, in southern Thuringia, Germany. It is situated 33 kilometres (21 mi) southeast of Saalfeld, and 45 kilometres (28 mi) northwest of Hof.

== History ==
Within the German Empire (1871-1918), Wurzbach was part of the Principality of Reuss-Gera.

== Photos ==
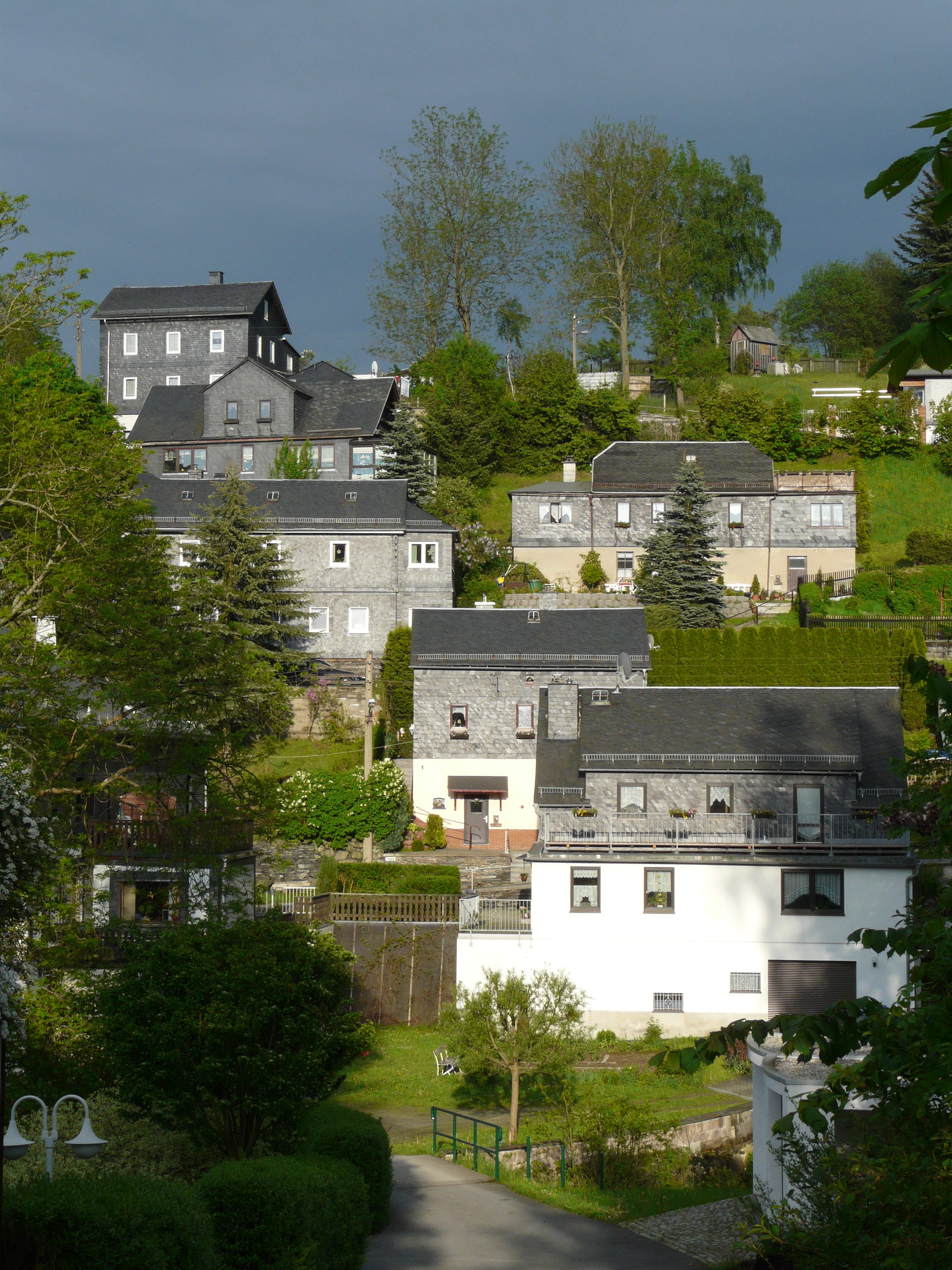
Homes "An der Sormitz"

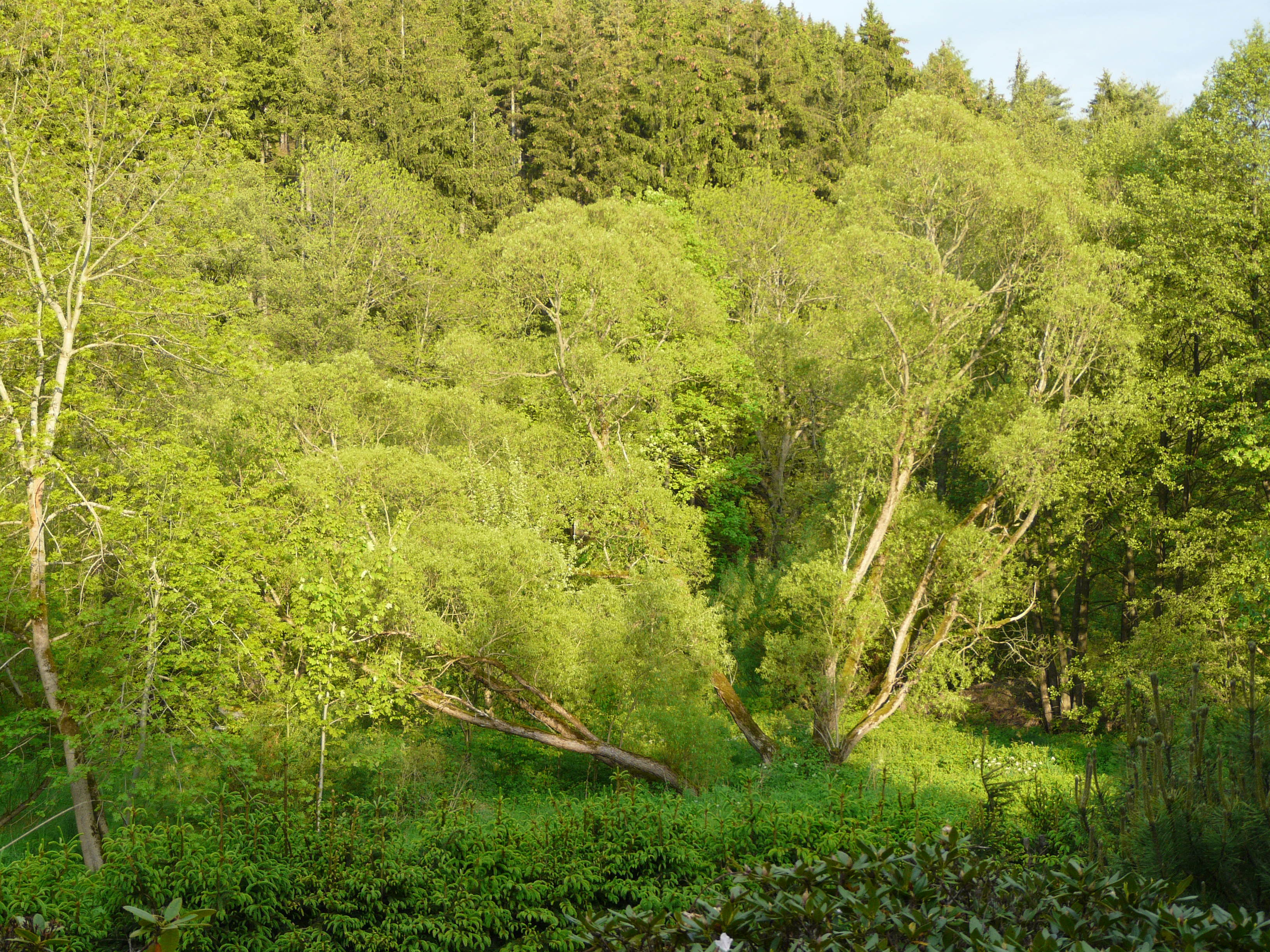
Town park

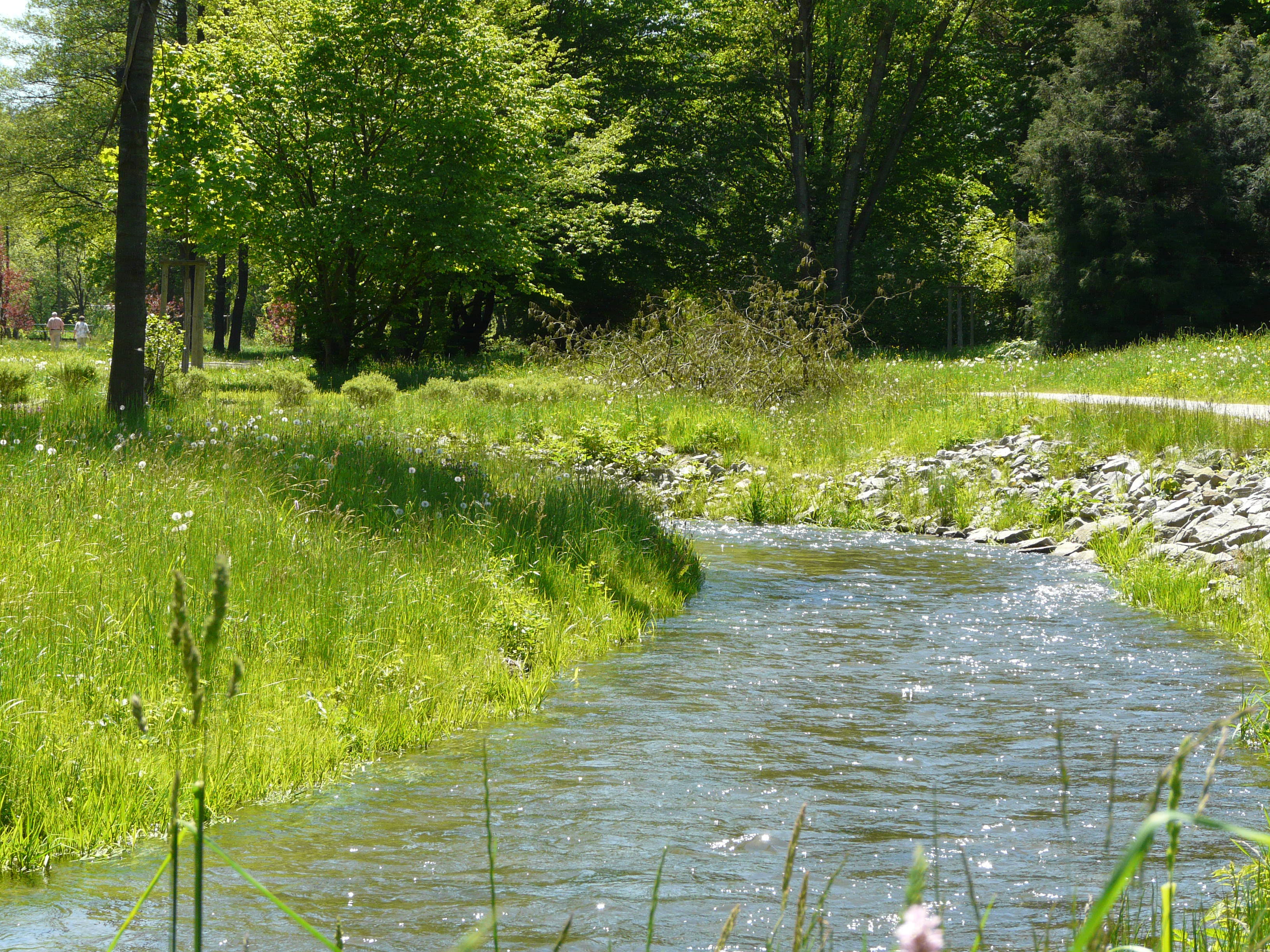
Sormitz (town park)

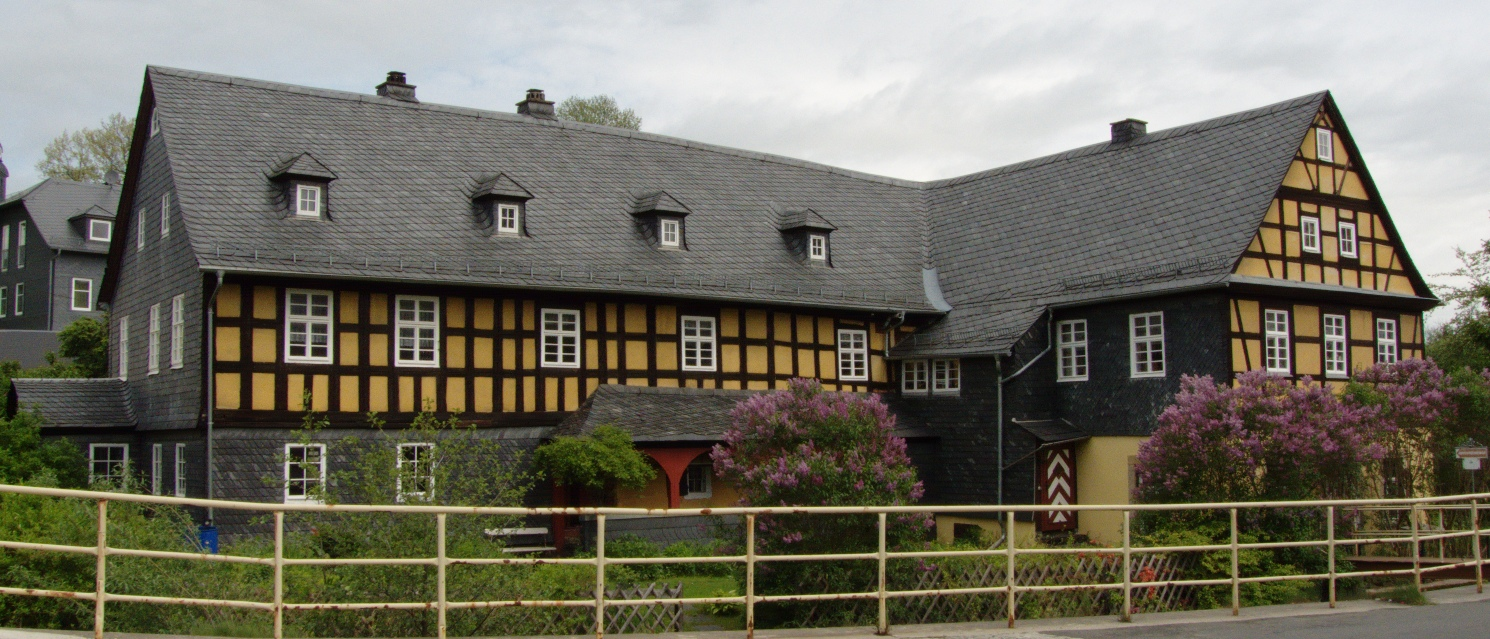
WurzBachHaus

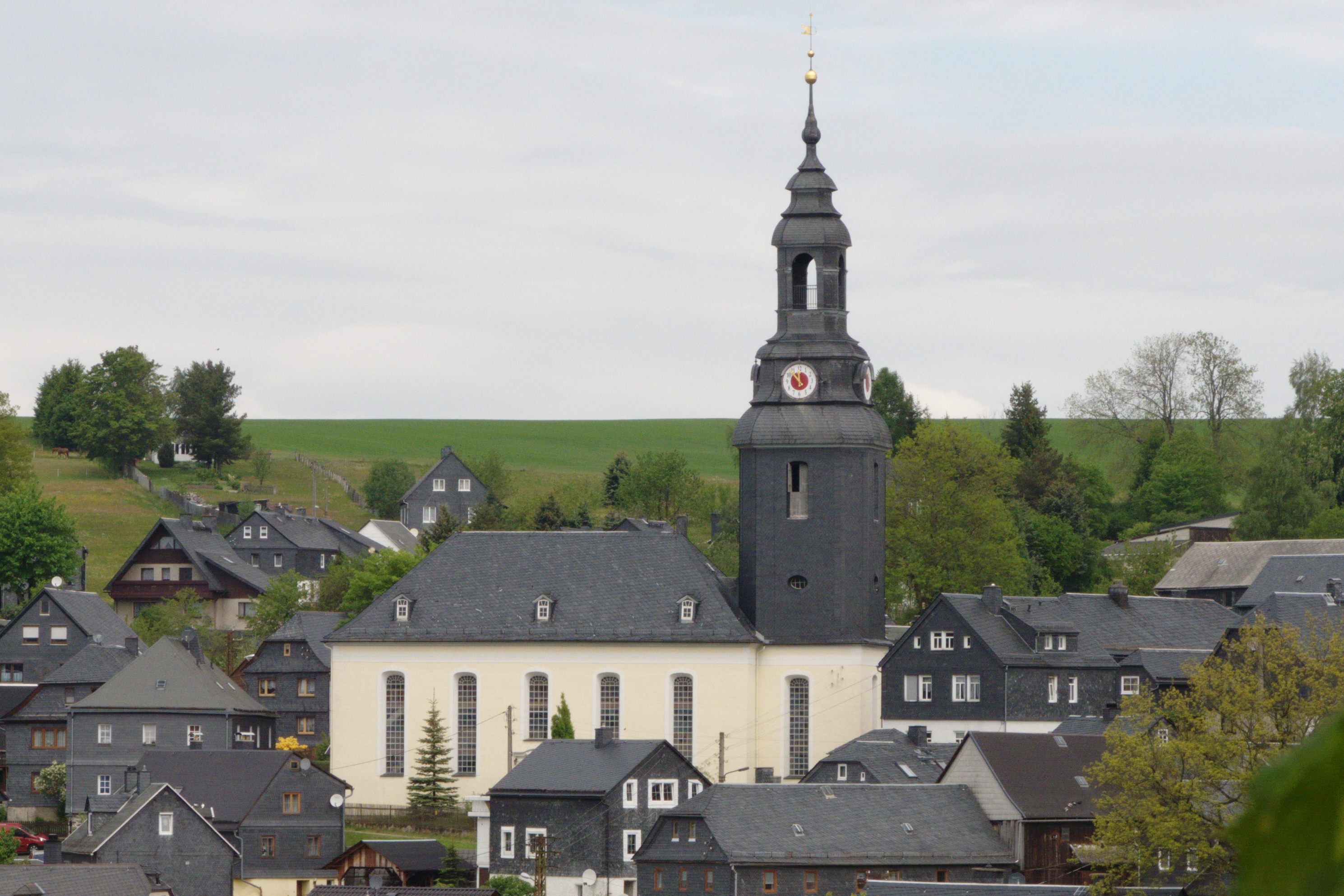
Church and houses, slate-faced.

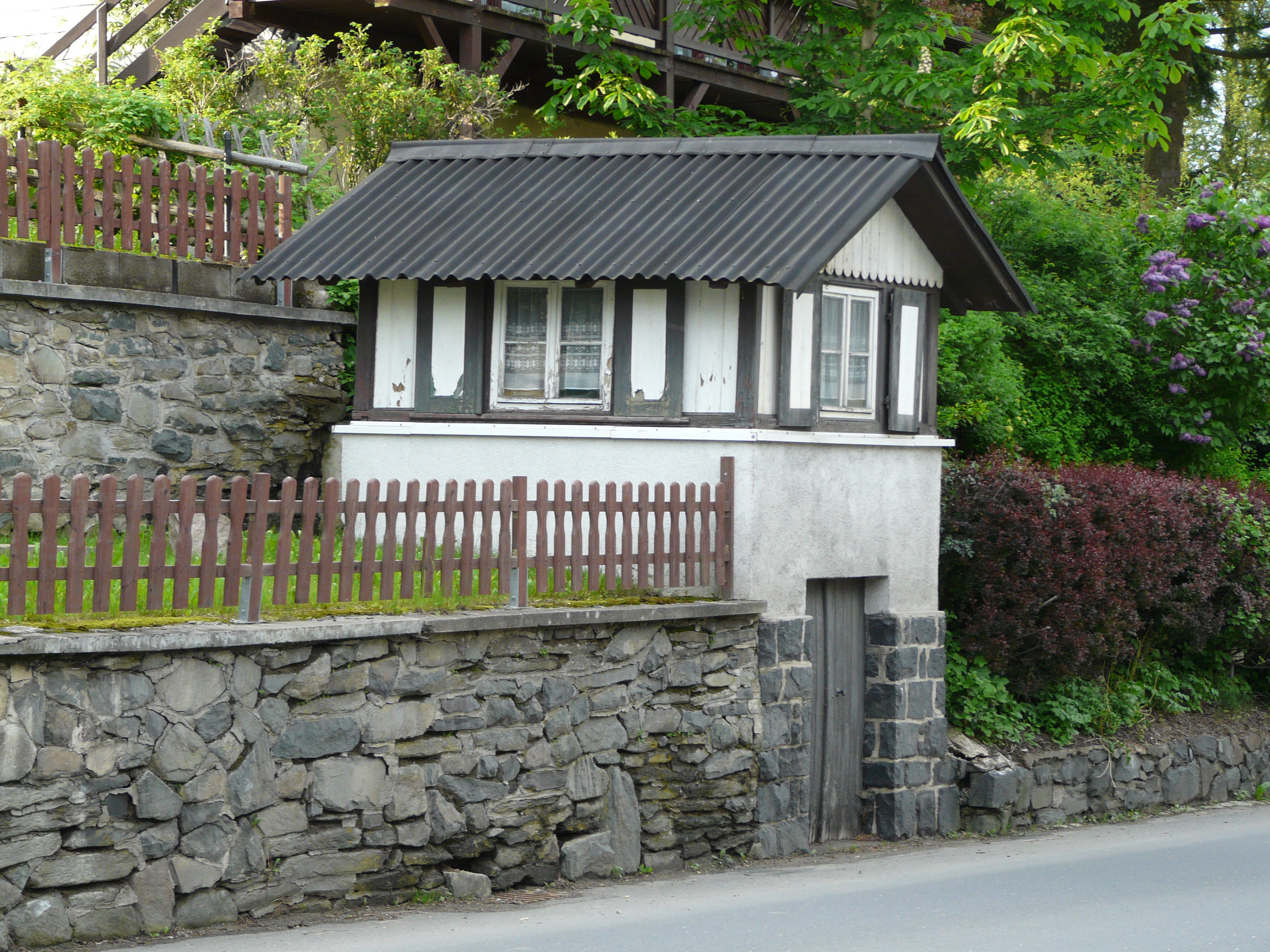
"Garden shed"

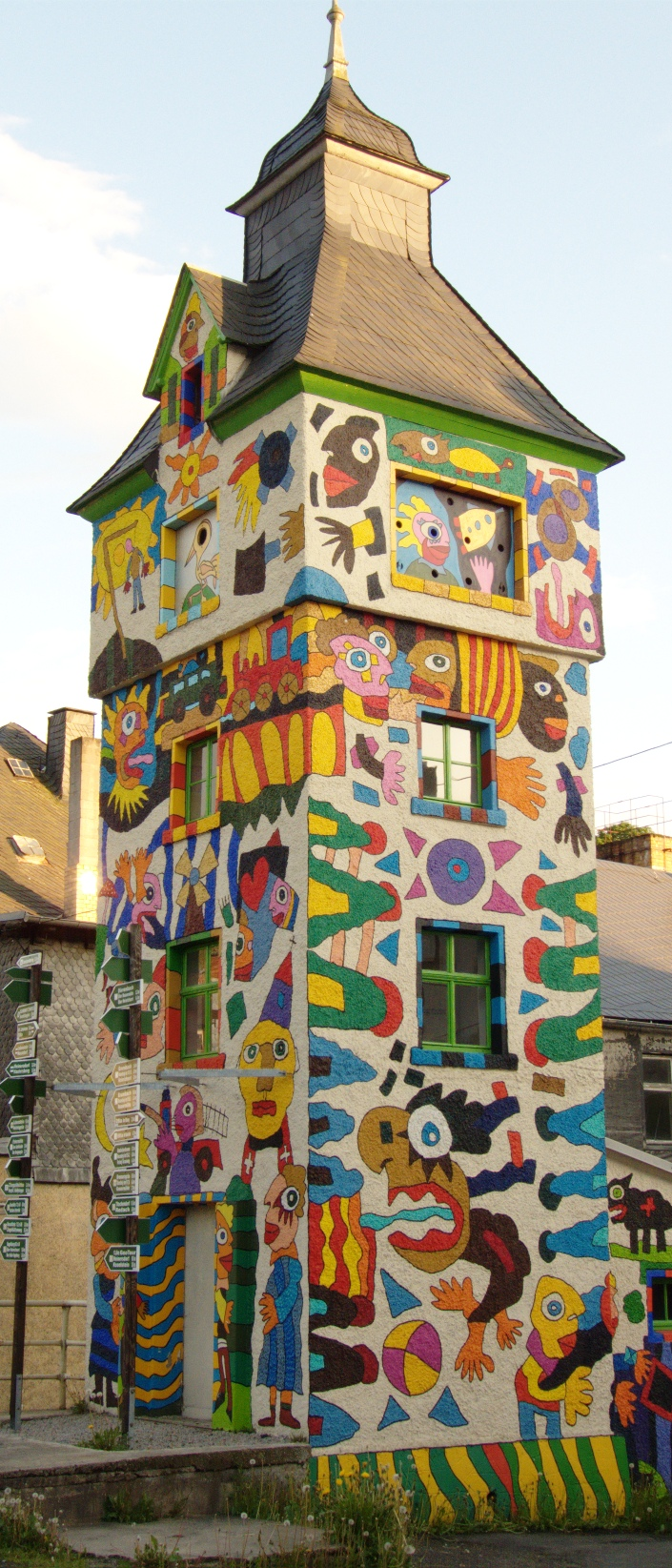
Tower (painted by Michael Fischer-Art)

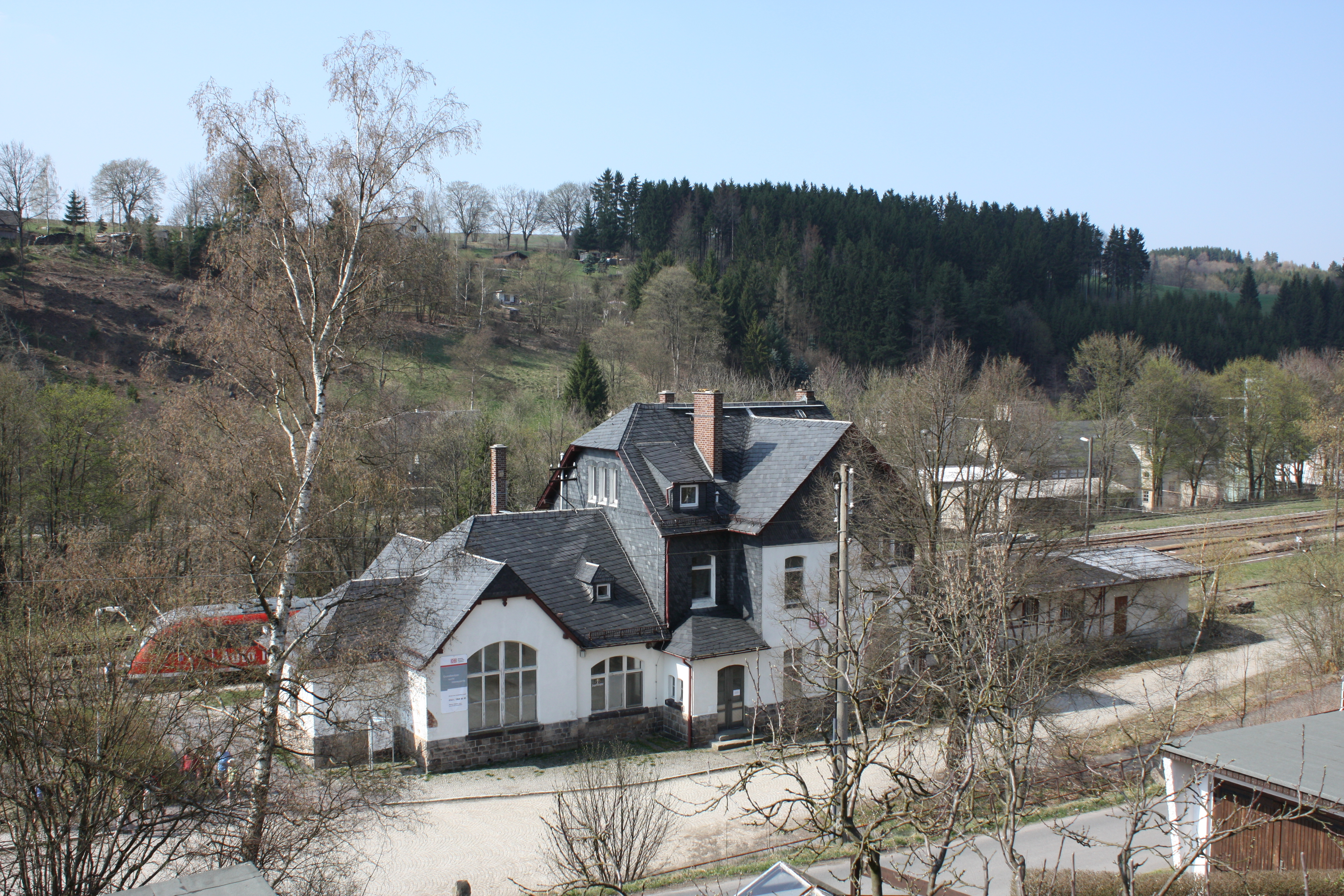
Station
