= Liebster Immanuel, Herzog der Frommen, BWV 123 =

Chorale cantata by JS Bach for Epiphany

Liebster Immanuel, Herzog der Frommen
- BWV 123
- Chorale cantata by J. S. Bach
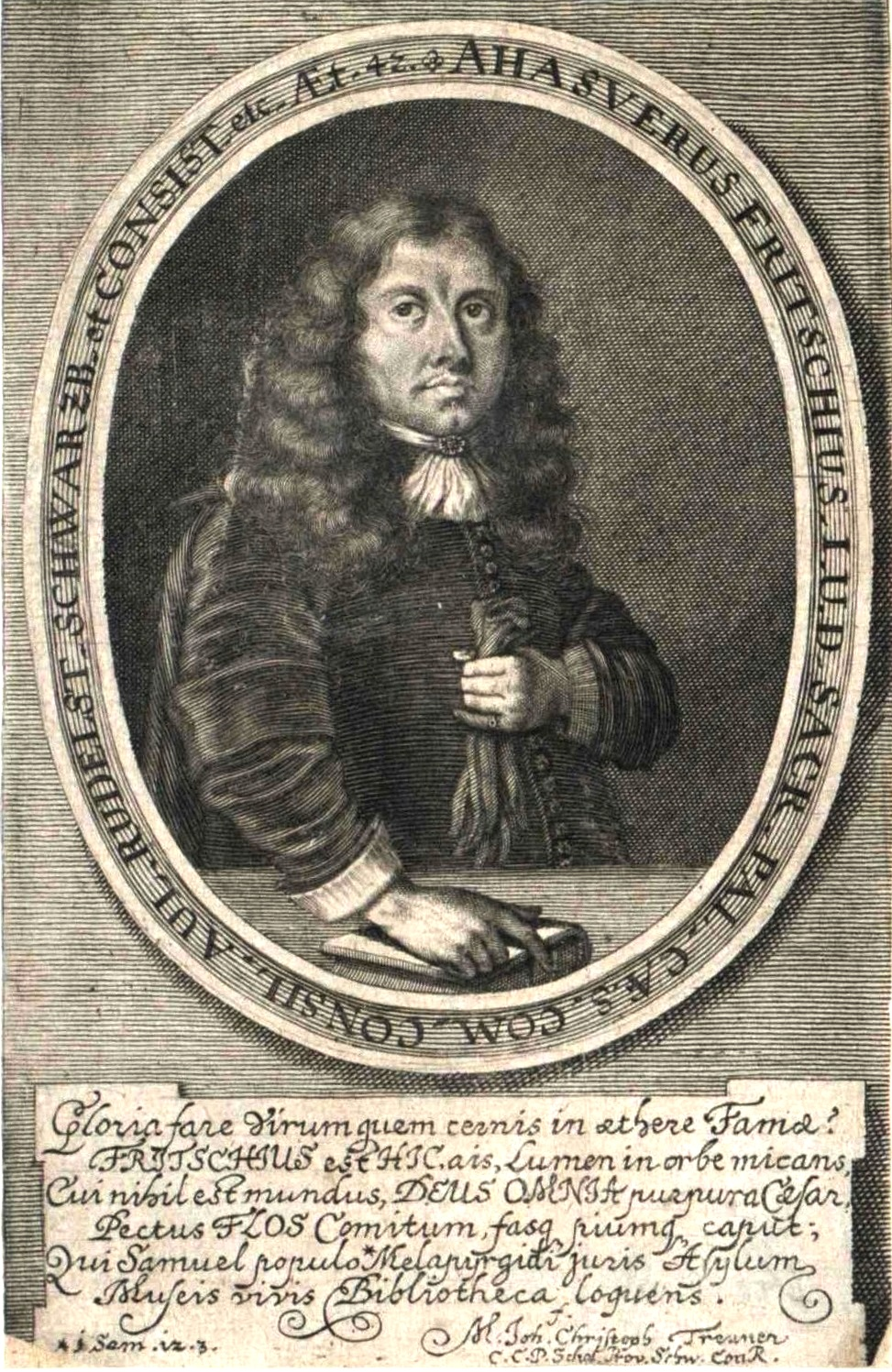
- Ahasverus Fritsch, author of the hymn
- Occasion: Epiphany
- Chorale: "Liebster Immanuel, Herzog der Frommen" by Ahasverus Fritsch
- Performed: 6 January 1725: Leipzig
- Movements: 6
- Vocal: SATB choir; alto, tenor and bass solo
- Instrumental: 2 traversos; 2 oboes d'amore; 2 violins; viola; continuo

Liebster Immanuel, Herzog der Frommen (Dearest Immanuel, Lord of the Faithful), BWV 123, is a church cantata by Johann Sebastian Bach. He composed it in Leipzig for Epiphany and first performed it on 6 January 1725. It is based on the 1679 hymn of the same name by Ahasverus Fritsch which is focused on the contrast of the vanities of the world and the trust in support by Jesus.

The cantata is part of Bach's chorale cantata cycle, the second cycle during his tenure as Thomaskantor that began in 1723. In the style of the cycle, an unknown poet retained the outer stanzas for framing choral movements and paraphrased the inner stanzas into four movements for soloists, alternating recitatives and arias. Bach scored the work for three vocal soloists, a four-part choir and a Baroque instrumental ensemble of traversos, two oboes d'amore, strings and basso continuo.

== History, hymn and words ==
Bach wrote the chorale cantata in his second year in Leipzig to conclude a set of Christmas cantatas on the Feast of Epiphany. The prescribed readings for the feast day were taken from the Book of Isaiah, the heathen will convert (Isaiah 60:1–6), and from the Gospel of Matthew, the Wise Men From the East bringing gifts of gold, frankincense and myrrh to the newborn Jesus (Matthew 2:1–12). The cantata text is based on the chorale in six stanzas by Ahasverus Fritsch (1679). The hymn is focused on the expectation of Jesus supporting the believer in sufferings on the "journey of the Cross" and the vanities of the world, expressing that hate and rejection cannot harm those who believe. It is among the few rather new hymns within Bach's chorale cantata cycle, influenced by early Pietism. The melody is found in the Darmstädter Gesangbuch published in 1698.

In the format of the chorale cantata cycle, an unknown poet retained the first and the last stanza, and paraphrased the inner stanzas to a sequence of as many recitatives and arias. The text has no specific reference to the readings, but mentions the term Jesusname (name of Jesus), reminiscent of the naming of Jesus celebrated on 1 January. The poet inserts "Heil und Licht" (salvation and light) as a likely reference to the Epiphany, and alludes to Christmas by "Jesus, der ins Fleisch gekommen" (Jesus who came into flesh).

Bach led the Thomanerchor in the first performed of the cantata on 6 January 1725.

== Music ==
=== Structure and scoring ===
Bach structured Liebster Immanuel, Herzog der Frommen in six movements. Both the text and the tune of the hymn are retained in the outer movements, a chorale fantasia and a four-part closing chorale. Bach scored the work for three vocal soloists (alto (A), tenor (T) and bass (B)), a four-part choir, and a Baroque instrumental ensemble of two traversos (Ft), two oboes d'amore (Oa), two violin parts (Vl), a viola part, and basso continuo. The duration is given as 22 minutes.

In the following table of the movements, the scoring, keys and time signatures are taken from Alfred Dürr's standard work Die Kantaten von Johann Sebastian Bach. The continuo, which plays throughout, is not shown.

Movements of Liebster Immanuel, Herzog der Frommen
No.	Title	Type	Vocal	Winds	Strings	Key	Time
1	Liebster Immanuel, Herzog der Frommen	Chorale fantasia	SATB	2Ft 2Oa	2Vl Va	B minor	9/8
2	Die Himmelssüßigkeit, der Auserwählten Lust	Recitative	A				common time
3	Auch die harte Kreuzesreise	Aria	T	2Oa		F-sharp minor	common time
4	Kein Höllenfeind kann mich verschlingen	Recitative	B				common time
5	Laß, o Welt, mich aus Verachtung	Aria	B	Ft		D major	common time
6	Drum fahrt nur immer hin, ihr Eitelkeiten	Chorale	SATB	2Ft 2Oa	2Vl Va	B minor	3/2

=== Movements ===
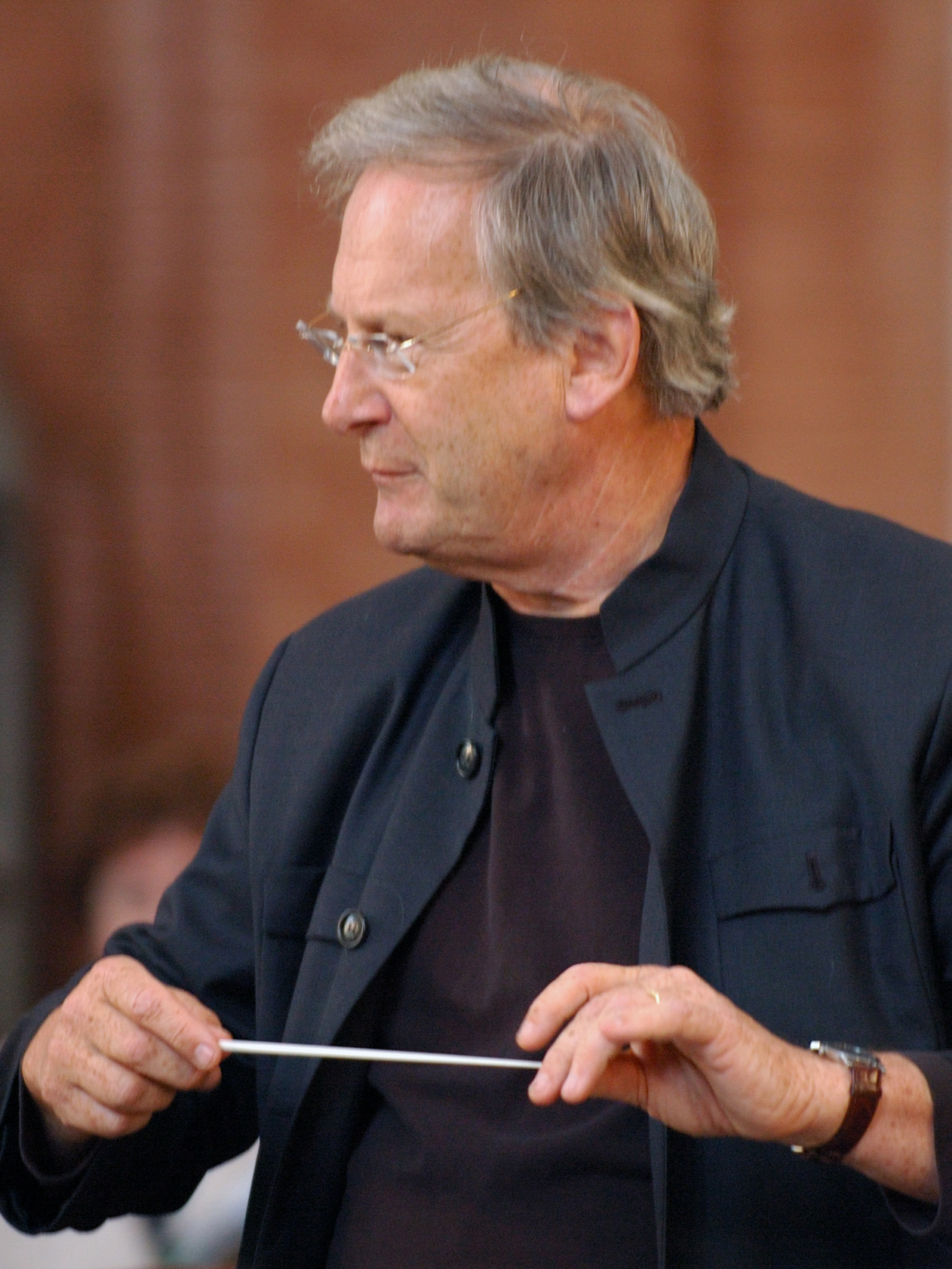
Gardiner in a rehearsal, 2007

John Eliot Gardiner, who conducted the Bach Cantata Pilgrimage in 2000 performing the cantatas for Epiphany at the Nikolaikirche in Leipzig, described the two works for the occasion, Sie werden aus Saba alle kommen, BWV 65, and Liebster Immanuel, Herzog der Frommen as "two of Bach's most striking Leipzig cantatas".

==== 1 ====
In the opening chorus, "Liebster Immanuel, Herzog der Frommen, du, meiner Seelen Heil, komm, komm nur bald" (Dearest Emmanuel, ruler of the righteous, You, salvation of my soul, come, come soon), Bach uses the beginning of the chorale melody as an instrumental motif, first in a long introduction, then as a counterpoint to the voices. The instruments, paired transversos, oboes and violins, play the material alternately. The soprano sings the cantus firmus in long notes. The lower voices are set mostly in homophony, which is unusual in the chorale cantata cycle. Two exceptions intensify certain passages; the call "Komme nur bald" (come soon) is rendered by many calls in the lower voices, and the text of the final line is first sung by the bass to the melody of the first line, which alto and tenor then imitate while the soprano sings the text to the chorale melody of the last line, achieving a connection of beginning and end of the movement. The prominent woodwinds, two flutes and two oboes d'amore, and the 9/8 time create a pastoral mood. Albert Schweitzer said of this chorus that the cantata Liebster Immanuel "is one of those that one cannot forget, so simple are the harmonies and indefinable their charm.

==== 2 ====
A secco recitative for alto expresses "Die Himmelssüßigkeit, der Auserwählten Lust erfüllt auf Erden schon mein Herz und Brust, wenn ich den Jesusnamen nenne" (The heavenly sweetness, the joy of the chosen already fills my heart and breast on earth when I recite the name of Jesus). The voice narrates with emotion, for example in a rising tritone ro express the word "Schmerz" (pain).

==== 3 ====
The tenor aria, "Auch die harte Kreuzesreise und der Tränen bittre Speise schreckt mich nicht" (Even the harsh journey of the Cross and the bitter meal of tears does not frighten me), is accompanied by two oboes d'amore. It is focused on "harte Kreuzesreise" (harsh journey of the Cross), illustrated by a chromatic ritornello of four measures in constant modulation. When the ritornello appears again at the end of the first section, it is calmer in the melodies, with the chromatic theme in the continuo, perhaps because the singer claims he is not frightened. In the middle section, thunderstorms are pictured "allegro" in "rapid vocal passages", which calm to "adagio" on "Heil und Licht" (salvation and light); this reference to the Epiphany is rendered more prominently by musical means than in the text.

==== 4 ====
A bass secco recitative expresses "Kein Höllenfeind kann mich verschlingen, das schreiende Gewissen schweigt" (No fiend of hell can devour me, the wailing conscience falls silent). Bach illustrates the beginning line by "a ninth descending in third intervals", and in contrast the imagined victory in "a major scale descending in octaves".

==== 5 ====
The bass aria, "Laß, o Welt, mich aus Verachtung in betrübter Einsamkeit" (O world, with disdain leave me alone in troubled solitude), features a flauto traverso as obbligato instrument. The phrase about "troubled solitude" is illustrated by "harmonic twists". Gardiner described it as "one of the loneliest arias Bach ever wrote". The voice is only accompanied by a single flute and a "staccato" continuo. Gardiner described the vocal line as "fragile" and "bleak in its isolation", and compared the sound of the flute to "some consoling guardian angel".

==== 6 ====
The cantata is closed by an unusual four-part chorale, "Drum fahrt nur immer hin, ihr Eitelkeiten, du, Jesu, du bist mein, und ich bin dein" (Therefore, be gone always, you vanities, you, Jesus, you are mine, and I am yours). The Abgesang of the bar form is unusually repeated, the repeat marked piano. The reason is likely the text which ends "bis man mich einsten legt ins Grab hinein" (until one day I am laid in the grave). Dürr noted similar soft endings also in Bach's early cantatas Gottes Zeit ist die allerbeste Zeit, BWV 106, and Gott, wie dein Name, so ist auch dein Ruhm, BWV 171, but also in 1725 in Also hat Gott die Welt geliebt, BWV 68.

== Publication ==
The cantata was first published in 1878 in the first complete edition of Bach's work, the Bach-Gesellschaft Ausgabe. The volume in question was edited by Alfred Dörffel. In the Neue Bach-Ausgabe it was published in 1975, edited by Marianne Helms.

== Recordings ==
A list of recordings is provided on the Bach Cantatas website. Vocal groups with one voice per part (OVPP) and instrumental groups playing period instruments in historically informed performances are marked by green background.

Recordings of Liebster Immanuel, Herzog der Frommen
Title	Conductor / Choir / Orchestra	Soloists	Label	Year	Choir type	Instr.
Die Bach Kantate Vol. 21	Helmuth Rilling Gächinger Kantorei Bach-Collegium Stuttgart	Helen Watts; Adalbert Kraus; Philippe Huttenlocher	Hänssler	1980		
J. S. Bach: Das Kantatenwerk – Sacred Cantatas Vol. 7	Nikolaus Harnoncourt Tölzer Knabenchor Concentus Musicus Wien	soloist from Tölzer Knabenchor; Kurt Equiluz; Robert Holl	Teldec	1982		Period
Bach Edition Vol. 3 – Cantatas Vol. 1	Pieter Jan Leusink Holland Boys Choir Netherlands Bach Collegium	Sytse Buwalda; Knut Schoch; Bas Ramselaar	Brilliant Classics	1999		Period
Bach Cantatas Vol. 18: Berlin / Weimar / Leipzig / Hamburg	John Eliot Gardiner Monteverdi Choir English Baroque Soloists	Sally Bruce-Payne; James Gilchrist; Peter Harvey	Soli Deo Gloria	2000		Period
J. S. Bach: Complete Cantatas Vol. 14	Ton Koopman Amsterdam Baroque Orchestra & Choir	Franziska Gottwald; Paul Agnew; Klaus Mertens	Antoine Marchand	2000		Period
J. S. Bach: Cantatas Vol. 32	Masaaki Suzuki Bach Collegium Japan	Andreas Weller; Peter Kooy	BIS	2005		Period
Bach: Cantates pour la Nativité / Intégrale des cantates sacrées Vol. 4	Eric J. Milnes Montréal Baroque	Monika Mauch; Matthew White; Charles Daniels; Harry van der Kamp	ATMA Classique	2007	OVPP	Period
