= Friedensburg Castle =

Coordinates: 50°33′54″N 11°27′33″E

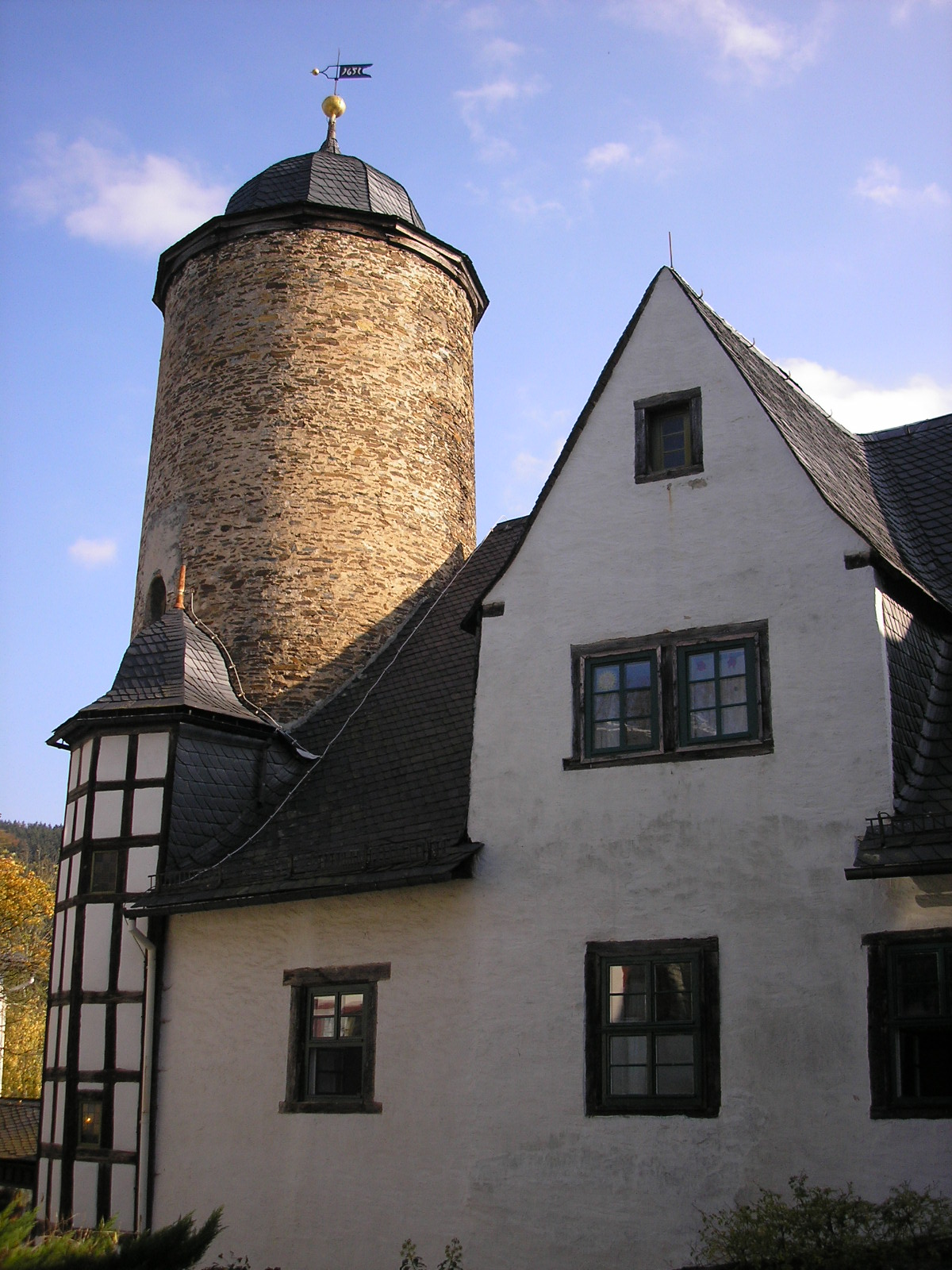
Bergfried (keep) of Friedensburg Castle

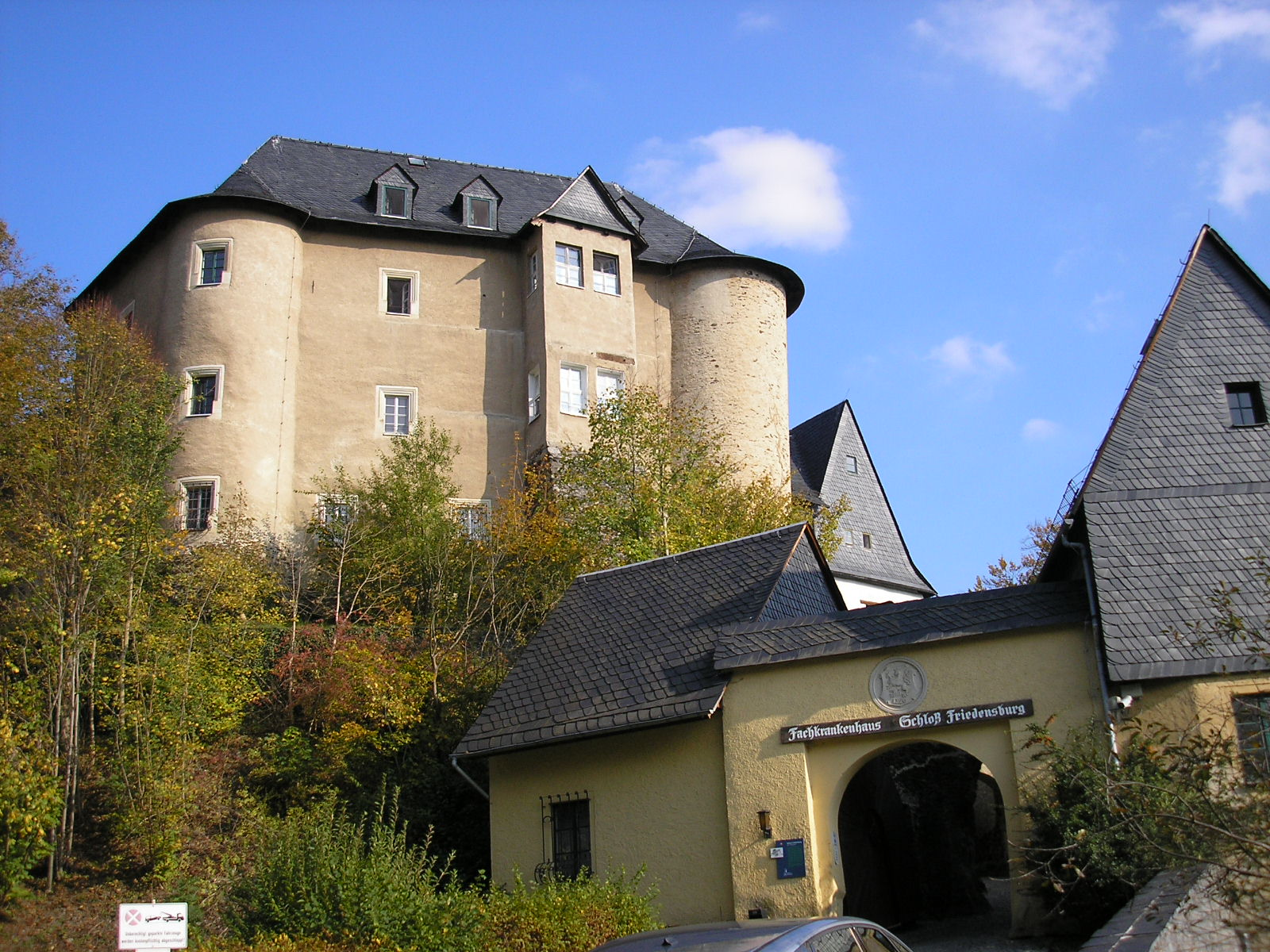
Gatehouse and castle walls

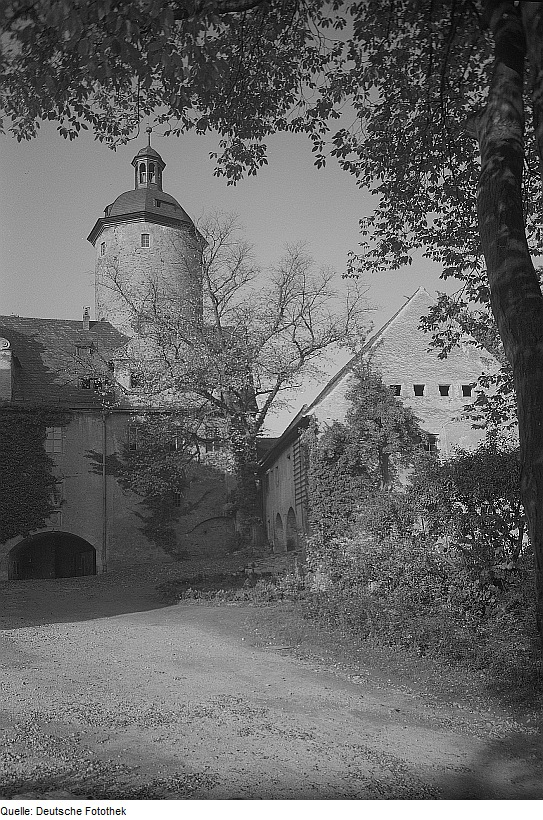
View of the castle in 1953/54

Friedensburg Castle (German: Schloss Friedensburg) is an early 16th-century castle overlooking the valley of the Sormitz at Leutenberg in southeast Thuringia, Germany. It was formerly the residence of the Counts of Schwarzburg-Leutenberg and today is a dermatological medical facility.

== History ==
In the 9th century CE, Slav tribes built a hill fort on the site of the castle to take refuge from the Sorbs to the east. There is evidence of a medieval fort beginning in the 14th century. It was the seat of the Ministeriales of Lutenberg (Leutenberg), who are first mentioned in 1187. The Counts of Schwarzburg were lords of the castle by 1326 and from 1363 to 1564 it was the residence of the cadet line of Schwarzburg-Leutenberg, after which it became the dowager house for the main line, whose seat was in Rudolstadt. (For example, from 1662 to 1670 the Lutheran hymnist Ludämilie Elisabeth von Schwarzburg-Rudolstadt lived there with her widowed mother and her sister, and it was probably there that she composed most of her hymns.) In the 16th century, constant inheritance conflicts emerged between the Houses of Schwarzburg and Leutenburg and the Counts of Orlamünde; the castle was renamed Friedensburg (Peace Fort) in 1564. It was little used from the mid-18th century on and passed out of the possession of the House of Schwarzburg in 1900. It became an inn in 1904 and a possession of the State of Thuringia in 1918.

The town of Leutenberg grew up as a result of the castle's presence. The castle was built in three phases: the massive Bergfried (keep) and the east wing, which originated in a freestanding residential tower, are the oldest parts; the north wing was built between 1362 and 1375; and the castle took on its current appearance in a third period of construction in the early 16th century, when the south wing was added and the defensive building reconstituted as a primarily residential castle. Since then, the castle has suffered repeated damage from fires, for example in 1567, 1695, 1726, 1800 and 1934. In the last fire, in 1934, the east, north and west wings were gutted and much of the historic interior was destroyed, including the 17th-century chapel. After rebuilding, the castle was used as part of an educational camp for evacuee schoolboys during World War II, then requisitioned for scientists from Peenemünde; during the Soviet administration and under the German Democratic Republic it was a holiday resort for Zellwolle Schwarza (1947–51), was administered by the State Forestry Service (1952–56) and then became a residence for the Council of Ministers. Between 1991 and 1993 it underwent a comprehensive restoration and has since been a specialised dermatological hospital.

== Sources ==
- C. Truppel. Die Friedensburg bei Leutenberg: ein Gang durch die alte Burg. Leutenberg: Verschönerungsverein, 1906 (in German)
- Berthold Rein. Die Friedensburg bei Leutenberg: eine thüringische Grenzfeste und ihre Bewohner. Thüringer Heimatbücher 1. Rudolstadt, Thuringia: Greifenverlag, 1925 (in German)
- Franz Groß. Die Friedensburg in Leutenberg. Weimar, 1957 (in German)
- Regina and Alexander Resch. Thüringer Burgen. Meiningen: Resch, 2007. ISBN 3-9810525-6-0 (in German)
- Thomas Bienert. Mittelalterliche Burgen in Thüringen: 430 Burgen, Burgruinen und Burgstätten. Gudensberg-Gleichen: Wartberg, 2000. ISBN 978-3-86134-631-9 (in German)
