= Ahasverus Fritsch =

German jurist, poet and hymn writer

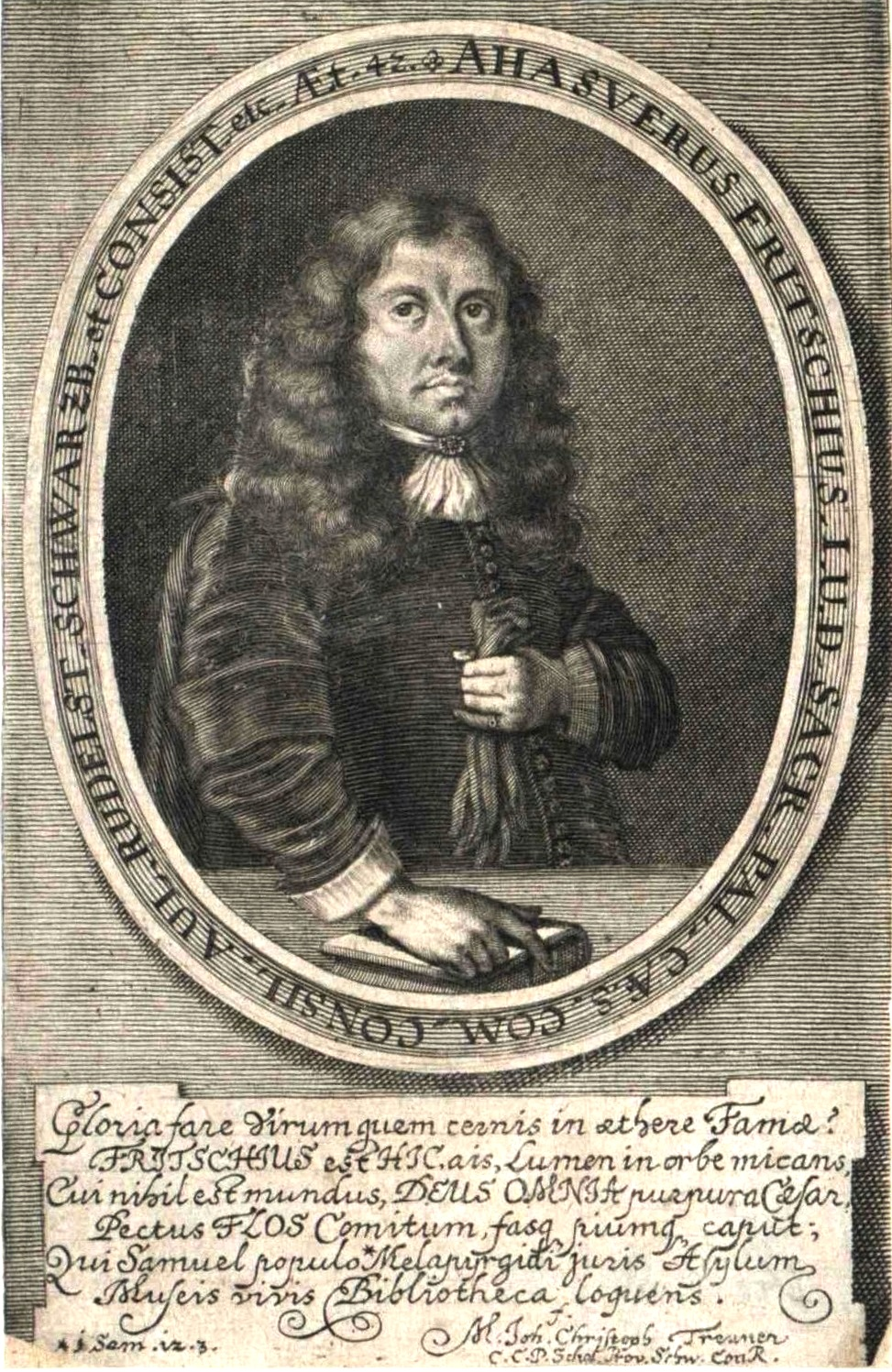
Ahasverus Fritsch, aged 42

Ahasverus Fritsch (16 December 1629 – 24 August 1701) was a German jurist, poet and hymn writer of the Baroque era.

== Life ==
Fritsch was born in Mücheln as a son of the mayor. In 1631, the family was forced to flee when the city was burned down. Later he attended the Gymnasium in Halle, and in 1650 he enrolled at the law faculty of the University of Jena. In 1657 he was appointed Hofmeister by Count Albert Anton von Schwarzburg-Rudolstadt. In his legal career, he was clerk of the Court in 1665, and in 1687 Chancellor of Schwarzburg-Rudolstadt. He was the first German legal scholar to deal with the danger of influencing the people by the press. Besides a large number of legal publications, he wrote hymns and devotional writings. He died in Rudolstadt.

Johann Sebastian Bach based his chorale cantata Liebster Immanuel, Herzog der Frommen, BWV 123, for Epiphany 1725 on a hymn in six stanzas by Fritsch and used single stanzas in other cantatas. His stanza "Wie herrlich ist die neue Welt" (How magnificent is the new world)" is part of Carl Heinrich Graun's oratorio Der Tod Jesu.

== Works ==
- Liebster Immanuel, Herzog der Frommen 1679
- De mendicantibus validis. Jena 1659
- 121 neue himmelsüsse Jesuslieder. 1668
- Schöne Himmelslieder. 1670
- Tabulae pacis inter imperatorum Romanum, Leopoldum Magnum, et imperii Germanici Status, ab una, et Ludovicum XIV, Galliarum regno, ab altera parte [...]. Frankfurt and Leipzig: Gottfried Liebezeit, 1699
- Discursus de novellarum ... usu et abusu (1676; Use and abuse of the press), in German in Die ältesten Schriften für und wider die Zeitungen, ed. K. Kurth. 1944
- Opuscula juris publici & privati. Nürnberg 1690
- Gesammelte Werke, hg. M. H. Griebner, 2 volumes. 1731-32
- Tractatus De Typographis, Bibliopolis, Chartariis, Et Bibliopegis. Hamburgi 1675, Online edition of the Sächsische Landesbibliothek - Staats- und Universitätsbibliothek Dresden
