= Albert Anton, Prince of Schwarzburg-Rudolstadt =

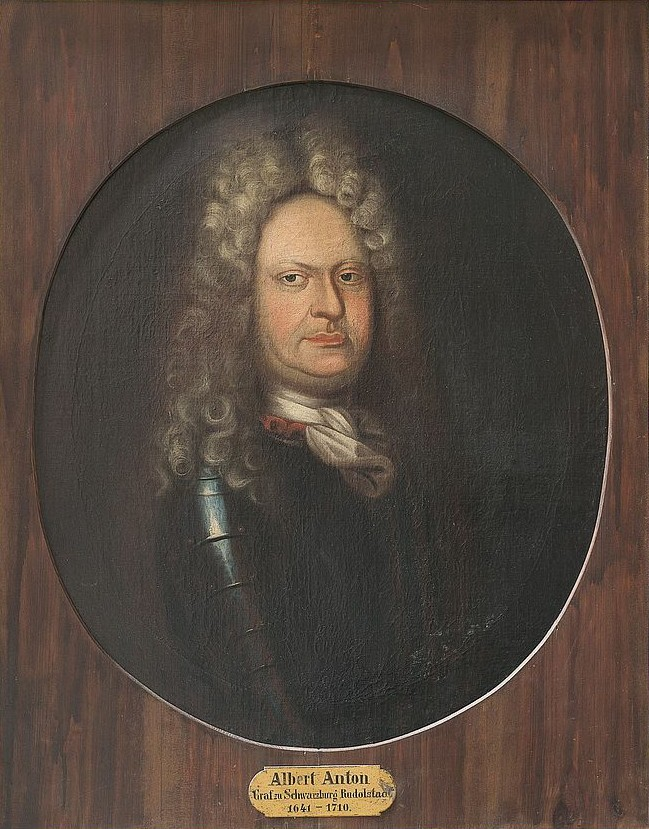
- 17th-century portrait
- Born: 14 November 1641; Rudolstadt
- Died: 15 December 1710 (aged 69); Rudolstadt
- Spouse: Countess Emilie Juliane of Barby-Mühlingen
- Issue: Louis Frederick I, Prince of Schwarzburg-Rudolstadt
- House: House of Schwarzburg
- Father: Louis Günther I, Count of Schwarzburg-Rudolstadt
- Mother: Emilie of Oldenburg-Delmenhorst

Albert Anton, Prince of Schwarzburg-Rudolstadt (14 November 1641 – 15 December 1710) was the ruling Count of Schwarzburg-Rudolstadt from 1662 to 1710. He was raised to Imperial Prince in 1697, however, he chose not to accept his elevation. In 1710, he was elevated again, and this time, he accepted.

== Life ==
Albert Anton was the son of Count Louis Günther I and his wife Emilie of Oldenburg-Delmenhorst. His wife and first cousin was the famous poet and hymn writer Emilie Juliane, née Countess of Barby-Mühlingen.

Albert Anton was esteemed very highly by Emperor Joseph I. In 1705, he was appointed imperial commissioner and tasked with organizing the Emperor's homage in the free imperial cities of Mühlhausen and Goslar. Two commemorative coins were minted on this occasion.

In 1697, he was raised to an Imperial Prince and the County of Schwarzburg-Rudolstadt was raised to a principality. However, he chose not to accept his elevation. His main reason was his religious modesty, focussed on piety, which became more pronounced after the sudden death of his favourite sister Ludmilla Elisabeth. He also wanted to avoid a confrontation with his neighbours, the Dukes from the Ernestine lines of the House of Wettin, who had opposed his elevation.

In 1710, the elevation was reaffirmed and this time, Albert Anton accepted it. However, he did not publish his elevation and continued to use the style Count of Schwarzburg-Rudolstadt. His son and successor Louis Frederick I published the elevation in 1711, and began using the style Prince of Schwarzburg-Rudolstadt on 15 April 1711.

Albert Anton was a friend and promoter of science. He was motivated by a desire to develop his country in every possible way. He created a number of charitable foundations aiming to facilitate access to scientific knowledge.

He died on 15 December 1710 in Rudolstadt, and was succeeded by his son Louis Frederick I.

== Marriage and issues ==
Albert Anton married Emilie Juliane in 1665. They had two children:

1. Louis Frederick I (b. 25 October 1667 — d. 24 June 1718)
2. Albertina Antonia (b. and d. 1668)

== See also ==
- House of Schwarzburg
- Schwarzburg-Rudolstadt

Albert Anton, Prince of Schwarzburg-Rudolstadt House of Schwarzburg Born: 14 November 1641 Died: 15 December 1710
Preceded by Emilie of Oldenburg-Delmenhorst as regent	Count of Schwarzburg-Rudolstadt; 1662-1710	Succeeded by Louis Frederick I as Prince of Schwarzburg-Rudolstadt
