= Kaulsdorf (Saale) =

- Municipality
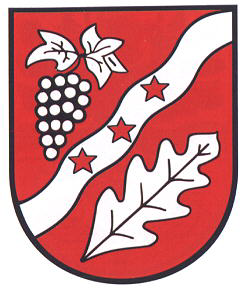
- Coat of arms

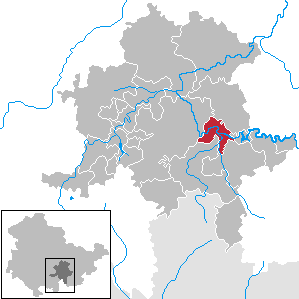
- Location of Kaulsdorf within Saalfeld-Rudolstadt district
- Interactive map of Kaulsdorf
- Location within Germany Location within Thuringia
- Coordinates: 50°38′N 11°26′E
- Country: Germany
- State: Thuringia
- District: Saalfeld-Rudolstadt
- Subdivisions: 5

Government
  - Mayor (2024–30): Kerstin Barczus

Area
  - Total: 21.73 km^{2} (8.39 sq mi)
- Elevation: 240 m (790 ft)

Population (2025-12-31)
  - Total: 2,340
  - Density: 108/km^{2} (279/sq mi)
- Time zone: UTC+01:00 (CET)
  - Summer (DST): UTC+02:00 (CEST)
- Postal codes: 07338
- Dialling codes: 036733
- Vehicle registration: SLF
- Website: www.kaulsdorf-saale.de

Kaulsdorf is a municipality in the district Saalfeld-Rudolstadt, in Thuringia, Germany.

== History ==
The place was first mentioned in 1074 in a document from the Benedictine monastery in Saalfeld. The Kaulsdorfer Saalmühle was first mentioned in a document in 1425. A castle, additionally protected by moats, stood on the site of the castle, which is still well-preserved today.

Kaulsdorf originally belonged to the County of Weimar-Orlamünde as a Wettin fiefdom. Part of the area was given as a fief to the Margraviate of Brandenburg-Bayreuth under Bohemian suzerainty in 1427 and sold to the Schwarzburgers in 1438 and by them to the Mansfeld-Vorderort in 1503.

Within the German Empire (1871-1918), Kaulsdorf was part of the Prussian Province of Saxony.
