= Maria of Jever =

Last ruler of Jever from the Wiemken dynasty

- Lady of Jever
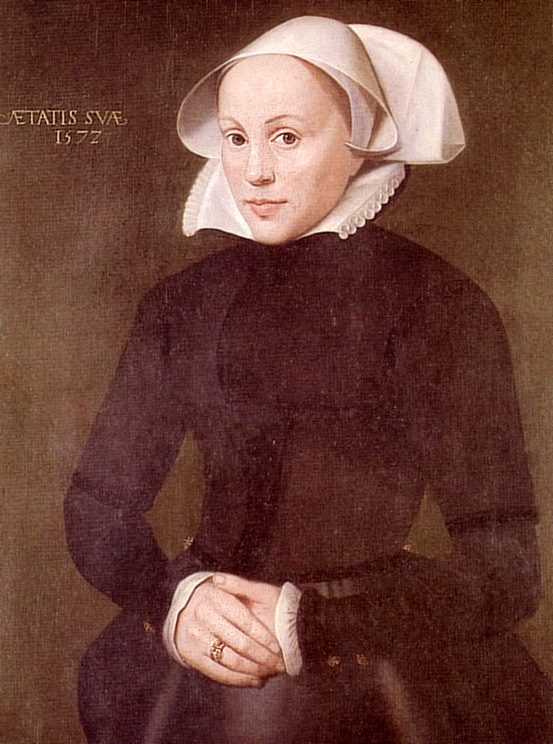
- Painting of Maria of Jever, 1572

Lady of Jever
- Reign: 2 June 1517 – 20 February 1575
- Predecessor: Christopher I
- Successor: John VII
- Born: 5 September 1500; Jever, Friesland, Germany
- Died: 20 February 1575 (aged 74); Jever, Friesland, Germany
- House: Wiemken
- Father: Edo Wiemken the Younger
- Mother: Heilwig of Oldenburg

Maria of Jever, known in Jeverland as Fräulein Maria (5 September 1500 – 20 February 1575), was the last ruler of the Lordship of Jever from the Wiemken family. She ruled from 1517 to her death.

== Early life ==
Maria was the third child of the East Frisian chieftain, Edo Wiemken the Younger of Jever (1454-1511), by his second wife, Countess Heilwig of Oldenburg (1473–1502). Her mother was younger sister of Count John V of Oldenburg. Heilwig died when she was one year old and her father about 10 years later.

After her father's death, a council of five village elders took up the regency and guardianship of his children. Her brother Christopher was given a suitable education to become the next Lord of Jeverland. Maria and her two sisters were raised to marry economically and politically favorable prospects.

== Succession Problems ==
However, Lord Christopher suddenly died at the age of 18. This drastically changed the situation. Since there was no male heir, Maria inherited the Jeverland. Edzard I, Count of East Frisia, demonstrated his military strength at the common border. With the approval of the regents, he concluded a marriage contract, which made him protector of Jeverland.

Maria seemed destined to marry one of Edzard's sons. However, the future counts Enno and John couldn't wait until the marriage and occupied Jever Castle in 1527, exposing her to severe humiliation. The East Frisian Landdrost Boing of Oldersum, who was probably in love with Maria, drove the invaders out of Jeverland. However, he died during a siege of Wittmund and Maria never married.

== Lady of Jeverland ==
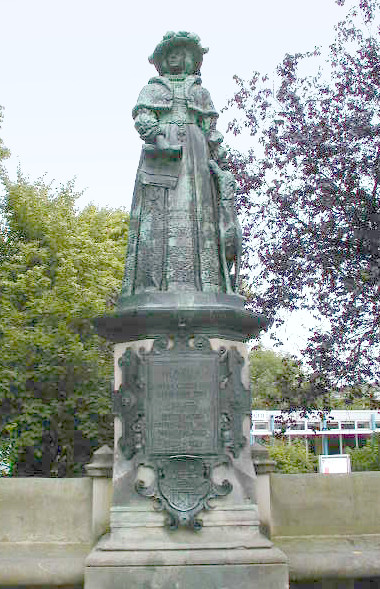
Monument to Maria of Jever, near Jever castle, by Harro Magnussen.

In 1531, in order to defend her rule against local rivals and enemies, Maria made the unusual decision of requesting assistance from Emperor Charles V, to assert her independence and secure her role against her neighbors. As Count of Holland and Duke of Brabant, he took possession of Jeverland and then gave it back to her as a fief. Thus, while the Emperor protected her right to rule, she ended the imperial immediacy Jeverland had enjoyed since 1417. Due to this, however, she was finally able to gain sole control over Jever.

In the subsequent years, Maria managed to defend her father's inheritance and gradually got a grip on the business of government. Some sources state that this was due to her strong will and growing desire for independence.

Initially opposed to the Reformation, she introduced Lutheranism in Jever in 1532. Maria has been described as a good ruler who did much for her territory. She benefitted trade and made sure that the justice system and law and order was respected. She stimulated the administration of justice and gave Jever city rights in 1536. She expanded her castle and enlarged her territory by creating new polders and locks, which allowed agriculture and commerce to flourish.

In 1556, Maria converted the choir of the city church, which had been damaged several times, into a grave chapel. Between 1561 and 1564, a Renaissance grave monument for her father was erected in the chapel. This monument still exists.

== Death ==
Maria died in 1575, after nearly fifty years in government. Her death was initially kept secret for fear that the Counts of East Frisia might grab power. Her room was sealed and food was placed outside her door. A servant is said to have secretly eaten the food so no suspicion would arise until Maria's rightful heir, Count John VII of Oldenburg, had arrived.
