= Schortens =

- Town
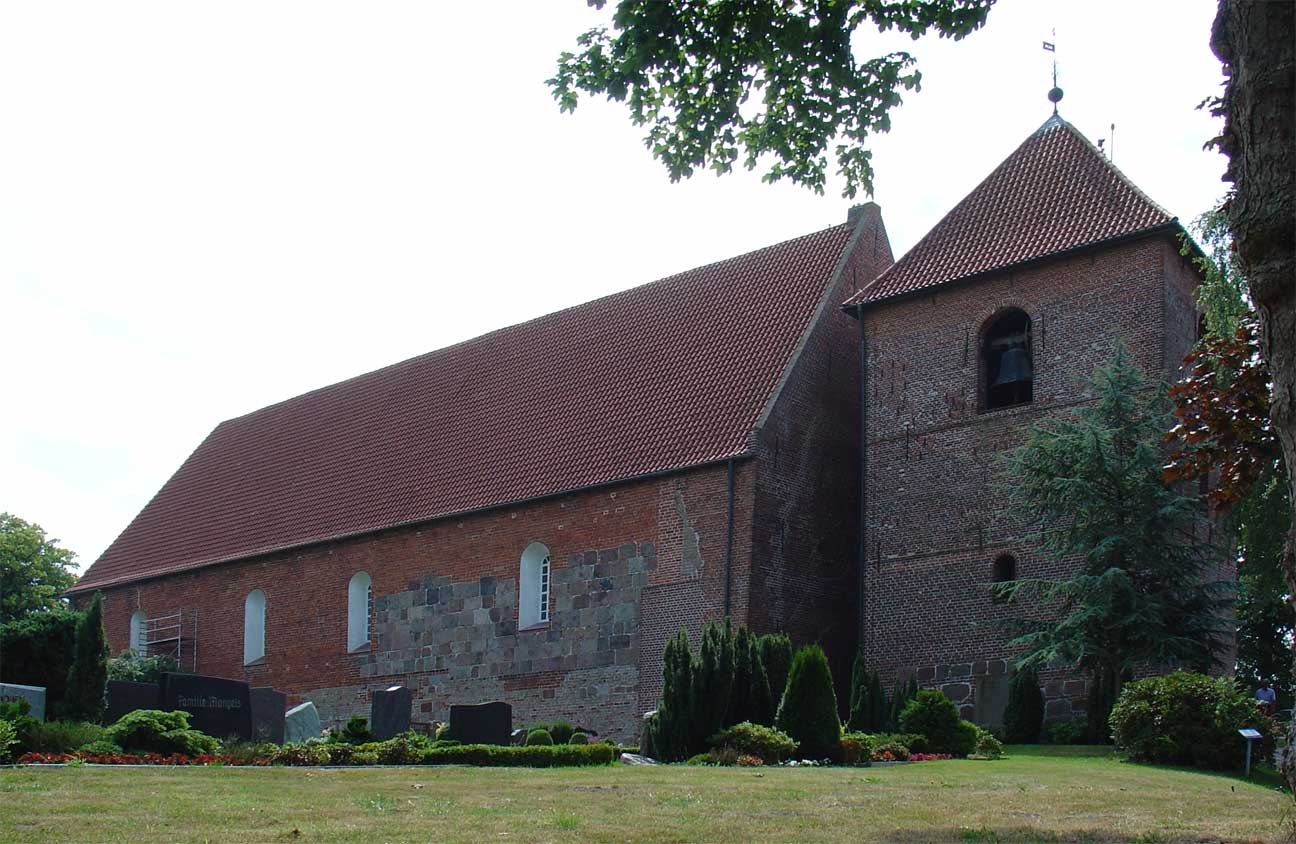
- Church of Saint Stephen

- Flag Coat of arms

- Location of Schortens within Friesland district
- Interactive map of Schortens
- Location within Germany Location within Lower Saxony
- Coordinates: 53°32′N 7°57′E
- Country: Germany
- State: Lower Saxony
- District: Friesland
- Subdivisions: 12 districts

Government
  - Mayor (2019–24): Gerhard Böhling (Ind.)

Area
  - Total: 68.8 km^{2} (26.6 sq mi)
- Elevation: 6 m (20 ft)

Population (2025-12-31)
  - Total: 21,001
  - Density: 305/km^{2} (791/sq mi)
- Time zone: UTC+01:00 (CET)
  - Summer (DST): UTC+02:00 (CEST)
- Postal codes: 26419
- Dialling codes: 04421–23, 04461, 04468
- Vehicle registration: FRI
- Website: www.schortens.de

Schortens (German pronunciation: [ˈʃɔʁtn̩s]) is a town in the district of Friesland in Lower Saxony, Germany.

== Division of the town ==
The town currently consists of the following districts: Schortens, Heidmühle, Grafschaft, Accum, Sillenstede, Schoost, Roffhausen, Middelsfähr, Addernhausen, Oestringfelde, Ostiem and Upjever.

== History ==
Graves discovered during excavations in the 1970s indicate the existence of an early human settlement in the area of Schortens already during the 5th century.

In 1158 Schortens was first mentioned as "Scrotinh" in a document of Pope Adrian IV. Later the name changed to "Scrotinghe". In 1400 the place was called "Schortense".

The St. Stephan Church in Schortens was built shortly after 1153 as a result of a victory of the Östringer against a superior army.

In the Middle Ages, the monastery of Oestringfelde, which was also used as an asylum, was well known for its horse breeding.

During the second half of the 1900s, the naval base Wilhelmshaven contributed greatly to the development of the town. Many workers settled down in what would become central Schortens, a railway connection to Jever, established in 1871 also contributed to the development of the town. After the end of World War I, the production of warships ceased and unemployment escalated. From 1946, a steady stream of refugees have moved to Schortens, increasing the population greatly. The deployment of the Olympia-Werke typewriter factory in Roffhausen just after World War II is also seen as an important stage in the development of the town. Around 1970, this factory had jobs for 12,000 people, thus preventing unemployment in the entire region. The Olympia works had to shut down in 1992.

In 1933 Schortens united with the towns of Cleverns and Sande to form the Greater Oestringen, this union was however dissolved during World War II.

In 1936 an air force base in Upjever was opened, which is still in use today.

Schortens received municipal rights on January 21, 2005. Since June 1, 2005, the city of Schortens is an independent municipality.

== Bibliography ==
- Werner Brune (Hrsg.): Wilhelmshavener Heimatlexikon. 3 Volumes. Brune Druck- und Verlagsgesellschaft, Wilhelmshaven 1986.
- Karl-Ernst Behre: Die Geschichte der Landschaft um den Jadebusen. Brune-Mettcker Druck- und Verlagsgesellschaft mbH, Wilhelmshaven 2012. ISBN 978-3-941929-02-9.
