= Friedrich Christoph Schlosser =

German historian and scholar (1776–1861)

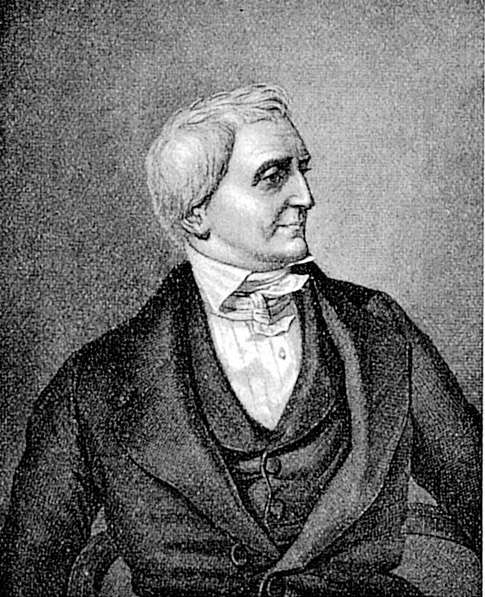
- Born: 17 November 1776; Jever
- Died: 23 September 1861 (aged 84); Heidelberg

Academic background
- Education: University of Giessen; University of Göttingen
- Academic advisors: Gottlieb Jakob Planck; Ludwig Timotheus Spittler; Johann Gottfried Eichhorn

Academic work
- Institutions: Heidelberg University
- Doctoral students: Ludwig Häusser

Friedrich Christoph Schlosser (17 November 1776 – 23 September 1861) was a German historian, Professor of History at the University of Heidelberg and a Privy Councillor in Prussia.

== Early years ==
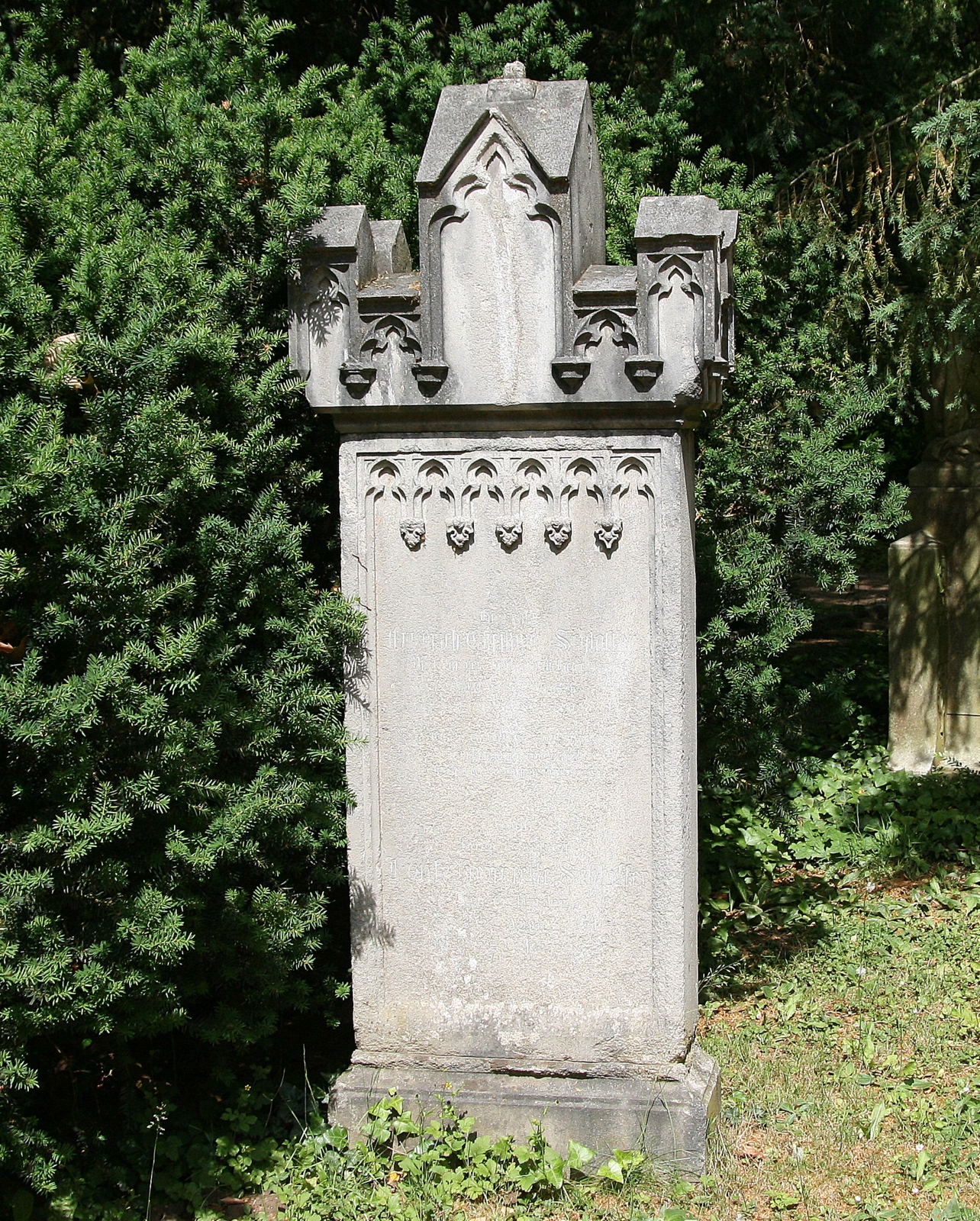
The grave in Heidelberg

He was born at Jever in the District of Friesland. He studied theology, mainly at Göttingen, and then tutored privately. Turning to the study of history, he became and remained for a quarter of a century the most popular German historian.

== Work ==
In 1807, inspired by his study of Dante, he published his first work Abélard und Dulcin, a defence of scholasticism and medieval thought. Two years later biographical studies of Theodore Beza and Peter Martyr Vermili (Leben des Theodor de Bela und des Peter Martyr Vermili, Heidelberg, 1809) revealed more great scholarship. In 1812 his History of the Iconoclastic Emperors of the East (Geschichte der bilderstürmenden Kaiser des oströmischen Reichs) was published, in which he contradicted some points in Edward Gibbon's highly opinionated work and sought to avoid painting the past in present-day colours. It won him the favour of Archbishop Karl Theodor Dalberg and secured him a Professorship in the Frankfurt Lyceum.

In 1815 the first volume of his World History (Weltgeschichte in zusammenhängender Erzählung) was published. This work, though never completed, extended through many volumes, bespeaking an inexhaustible energy and a vast erudition. A translation of the pedagogical handbook of Vincent of Beauvais and the accompanying monograph are still considered of value.

The next noteworthy work was a history of antiquity and its culture (Universalhistorische Übersicht der Geschichte der alten Welt und ihrer Kultur, 1st part, 1826; 2nd part, 1834), which, while revealing little knowledge of the new criticism of sources inaugurated by F.A. Wolf and B.G. Niebuhr, won its way by its unique handling of the subject and its grand style. In 1823 he published in two volumes a Geschichte des 18ten Jahrhunderts. This work, enlarged and improved, appeared in six volumes as Geschichte des 18ten Jahrhunderts und des 19ten bis zum Sturz des französischen Kaiserreichs (1836–1848). The history had a most extraordinary success, especially among the common people, since the author boldly and sternly sat in judgment upon men and events, and in his judgments voiced the feelings of the German nation in his day. It has been translated into English by D. Davison (8 vols, 1843–1852). Finally, Schlosser undertook a popular World History for the German People (Weltgeschichte für das deutsche Volk, 1844–1857), which also enjoyed the favour of those for whom it was written.

He left Frankfurt in 1819 to become professor of history at Heidelberg where he resided until his death. He was an elected member of the Royal Danish Academy of Sciences of Copenhagen, and of the Society of Literature of Leyden and other learned societies.

=== Works in English translation ===
- History of the Eighteenth Century and of the Nineteenth Century Till the Overthrow of the French Empire, volumes 1–8, Chapman and Hall. London, 1843–1852.

== Criticism ==
Schlosser stands apart from the movement towards scientific history in Germany in the 19th century. Refusing to limit himself to political history, as did Leopold von Ranke, he never learned to handle his literary sources with the care of the scientific historian. History was to him, as it had been to Cicero, a school for morals; but he had perhaps a juster conception than Ranke of the breadth and scope of the historian's field.
