= George Mueller =

George Mueller may refer to:

- George Mueller (engineer) (1918–2015), American engineer who served as an associate administrator at NASA
- George Müller (1805–1898), Christian evangelist and coordinator of orphanages in England
- George Mueller (Boardwalk Empire), the alias used by Nelson Van Alden in the TV series Boardwalk Empire

== See also ==
- Georg Müller (disambiguation)
