= Johann Albers =

German politician (1890–1964)

Member of the Landtag of Lower Saxony
- In office 1946–1959

Minister without portfolio in Lower Saxony
- In office 11 June 1947 – 9 June 1948

Mayor of Jever
- In office 1952–1961

Personal details
- Born: 16 October 1890 Jever, Germany
- Died: 19 April 1964 (aged 73)
- Party: Free Democratic Party

Johann Albers (16 October 1890 – 19 April 1964) was a German politician (FDP).

== Life and career ==
Albers was born on a small farm in Jever, Frisland, to Karl Albers and his wife Margaretha née Hellmerichs. After attending primary school, Albers completed an apprenticeship in the blacksmith's trade, then continued his education at a technical school and later passed the examination as a master blacksmith. From 1913 he worked as a self-employed master blacksmith in Jever and ran a secondary agricultural business. By then, he was already working in leading positions of the craftsmen. From 1923 onwards he was a member of the general assembly of Handwerkskammer Oldenburg (HWK). In 1933 he was removed from all offices and arrested.

Following the end of World War II, Albers became Senior Blacksmith and District Master Craftsman in 1945, and after his re-entry from 1948 to 1951 he became a member of the board, and eventually an honorary senior master, of the Oldenburg Chamber of Crafts.

== Politics and public offices ==
Initially, Albers was a member of the Freisinnige Volkspartei. In 1919, he became a member of the German Democratic Party until it was banned. During the National Socialist era he was exposed to various harassments as a convinced Democrat, which eventually forced to resign from all party and honorary offices in 1933. In 1945, he again began a member of the German Democratic Party, and an associate of Theodor Tantzen. As Tantzen's close confidant, Albers was a member of the Ernannter Oldenburgischer Landtag (Appointed Oldenburg Parliament) from 30 January 1946 and served as its president from 10 April 1946. He served as a member of the Landtag of Lower Saxony from 1946 to 1959.

From 11 June 1947 to 9 June 1948, Albers served as minister without portfolio in the Cabinet of the Government of Lower Saxony headed by Minister-President Hinrich Wilhelm Kopf.

In 1948, like other DDP politicians, he joined the Free Democratic Party (FDP). In the same year, together with Rudolf Garlichs, he founded the local branch of the FDP in Minsen. Like the other Free Democrats, he resigned from the coalition government of Lower Saxony because no agreement could be reached on a certain land reform and settlement law. As a representative of the Lower Saxony state parliament, Albers attended the first Federal Convention on 12 September 1949, which elected Theodor Heuss as President of Germany.

In 1951/52 Albers became deputy chairman of the FDP faction in the Lower Saxony state parliament. He also becamea member of the Federal Convention in 1954, when Heuss was re-elected.

Albers was also the Landrat (District Administrator) of the District of Friesland from 20 December 1945, and held this office until his death. From 1952 to 1961 he was still Mayor of Jever.

== Family ==
Albers married Elsa née Janssen (19 March 1891 – 12 May 1962), who also came from Jever.

== Awards ==
- 1955: Order of Merit of the Federal Republic of Germany

== Sources ==
- Barbara Simon: Abgeordnete in Niedersachsen 1946–1994. Biographisches Handbuch. Ed. by the President of the Lower Saxony State Parliament. Parliament of Lower Saxony, Hanover 1996, p. 18.
- Hans Friedl et al. (Ed.): Biographisches Handbuch zur Geschichte des Landes Oldenburg (Biographical Handbook on the History of the State of Oldenburg). Ed. by Order of the Oldenburgische Landschaft. Isensee, Oldenburg 1992, ISBN 3-89442-135-5, pp. 24–25. PDF (4.6 MB)
