= Jeverland =

Coordinates: 53°35′N 7°59′E

Jeverland is the northern part of the present-day district of Friesland in northern Germany with the town of Jever as the seat of its local government. The Jeverland was formed in the 15th century from the Barony of Jever, which itself descended from the Banter Viertel, part of Östringen and the Wangerland. The town of Wilhelmshaven, founded in 1853, no longer belongs to Jeverland, but is an independent district. Despite that, the formerly independent church parishes of Heppens und Neuende are on the town's territory. In earlier times, agriculture was the mainstay of Jeverland's economy.

Trade was chiefly handled by the small coastal 'sluice' ports (Sielhafen) of Hooksiel, Rüstringersiel and Mariensiel. The state of Kniphausen, which was for a time entirely politically independent, was also located in Jeverland along with its two ports of Inhausersiel and Kniphausersiel. Today its former territory lies partly within the town of Wilhelmshaven.
