= Wiebke Eden =

German writer

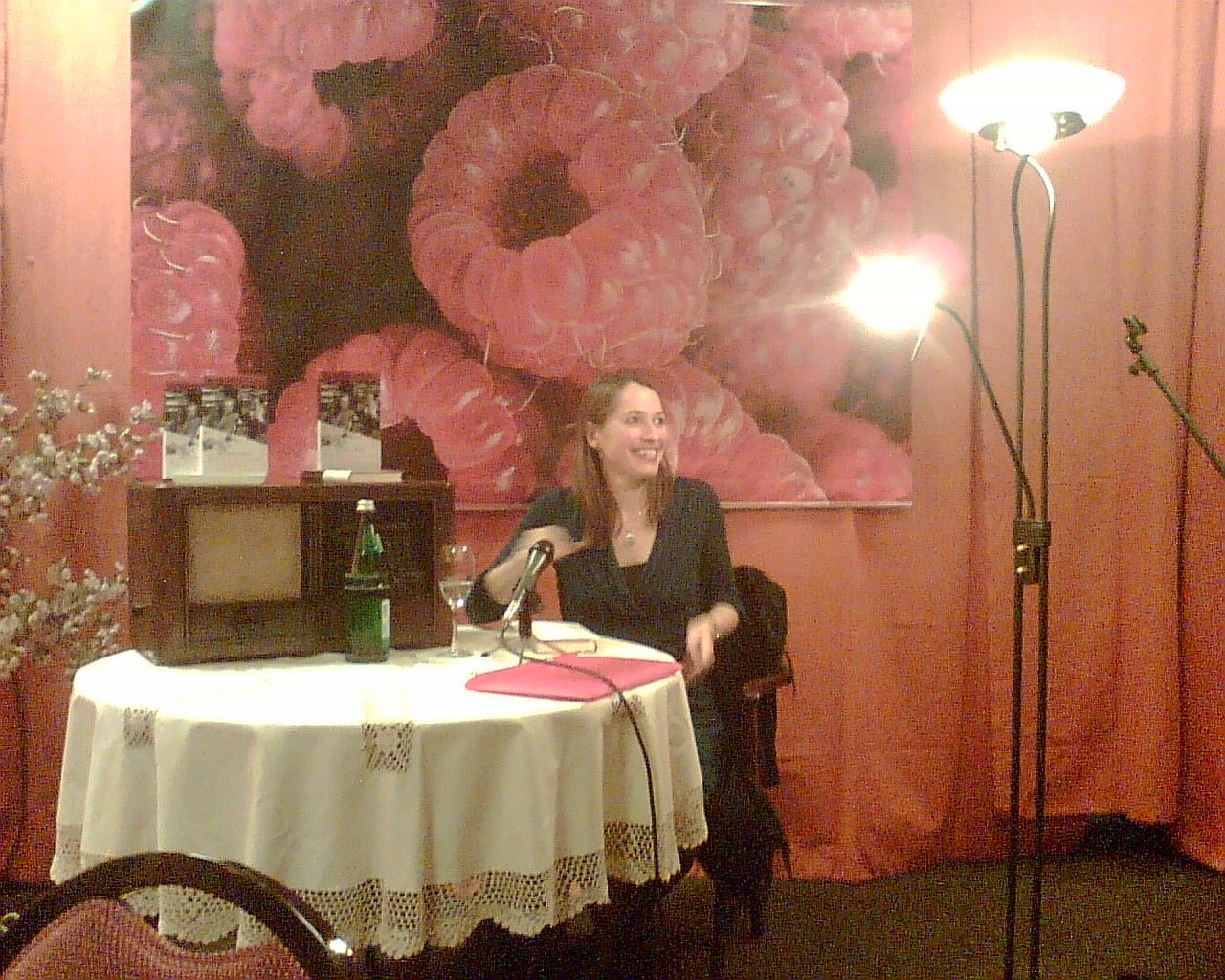
- Born: Wiebke Eden; 19 January 1968 (age 58); Jever, Germany
- Occupation: Writer
- Writing career
- Notable work: Time of the Red Fruits
- Notable awards: Young Investigator Award of the Chamber of Agriculture Weser-Ems. (1990)

Wiebke Eden (born 19 January 1968 in Jever, Lower Saxony), is a German writer.

In 1988 Eden started to work as a trainee at the Jeversches Wochenblatt. Afterwards she became an editor. From 1991 to 1996 she studied German Studies and Pedagogy at the University of Oldenburg before a full-time career as a freelance journalist and writer. In 2008, she published her first novel, Zeit der roten Früchte (Time of the red fruits) ISBN 978-3-7160-2375-4.
