= Harlebucht =

Former bay in East Frisia

Coordinates: 53°42′N 7°48′E

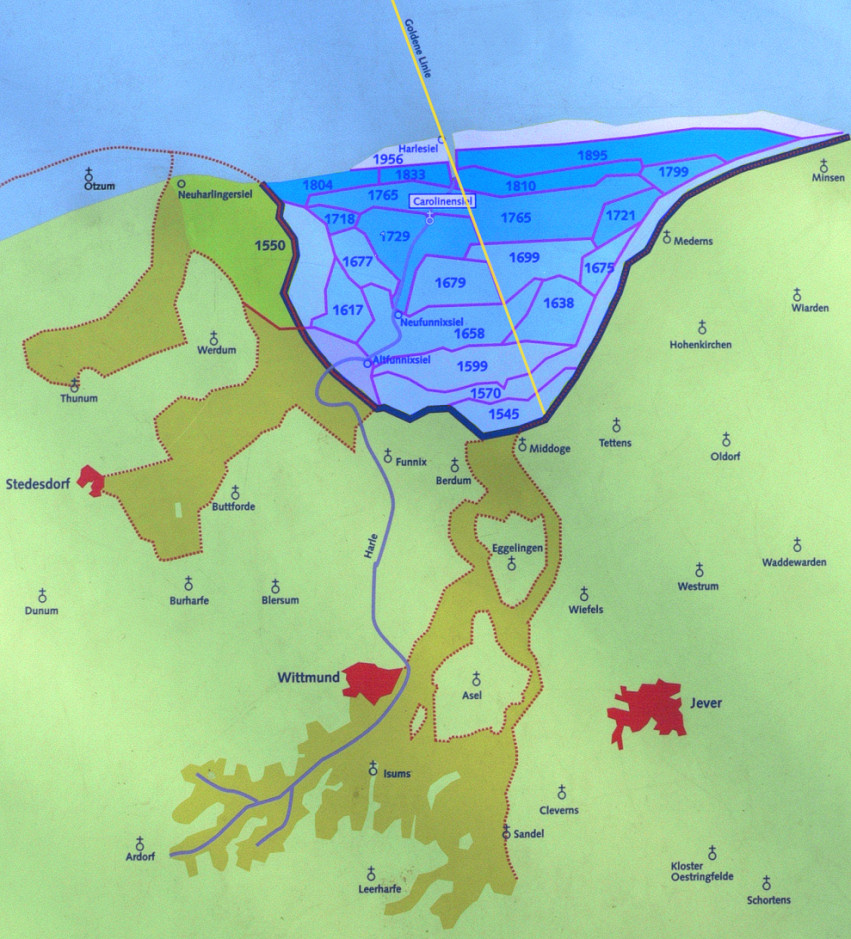
The original Harlebucht (blue) with the Golden Line. The dates on the smaller divisions indicate the year that each was diked and drained to become farmland.

The Harlebucht or Harle Bay was originally a bay approximately 15 kilometers wide that reached about 10 kilometers inland north of Wittmund in today's East Frisia. (A more appropriate translation of bucht here might be Bight; the German word can mean either.)

The water encroachments into the hinterland in the Grote Mandrenke (Second Marcellus Flood) in 1362, which reached as far as the Geest near Jever, gave rise to side bays and greatly enlarged the Harlebucht. Around 1550 began a period of building dikes and polders, draining the Harlebucht and turning it into farmland. Piece by piece, fertile farmland was created from what had been marsh and bay, until in 1894 the Elisabethgroden section was completed.
