= Georg Müller =

Georg Müller may refer to:

- Georg Müller (explorer) (1790–1826), German engineer and explorer
- George Müller (1805–1898), Christian evangelist and orphanage director
- Georg Müller (agricultural scientist) (1917–2004), German agricultural scientist
- Georg Elias Müller (1850–1934), German experimental psychologist
- Georg Müller (Catholic bishop) (1951–2015), bishop of Trondheim
- Georg Alexander von Müller (1854–1940), German Navy Admiral
- Georg Müller-Jürgens (born Georg Müller, 1883–1971), mayor of Jever, Germany
