= Jever =

Town in Lower Saxony, Germany

- Town
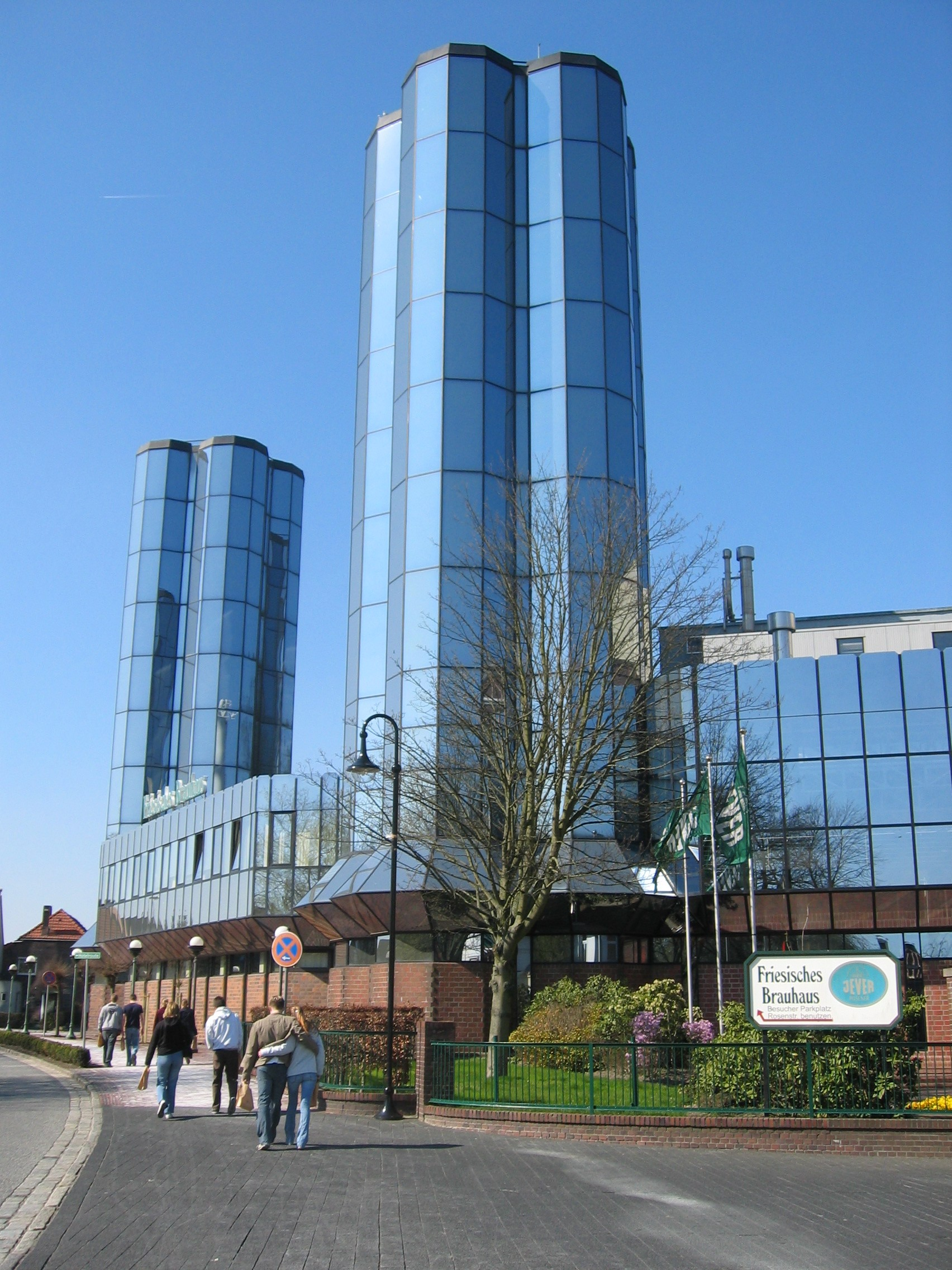
- The Friesisches Brauhaus, where Jever beer is brewed

- Flag Coat of arms

- Location of Jever within Friesland district
- Interactive map of Jever
- Location within Germany Location within Lower Saxony
- Coordinates: 53°34′28″N 7°54′03″E
- Country: Germany
- State: Lower Saxony
- District: Friesland

Government
  - Mayor (2021–26): Jan Edo Albers (Ind.)

Area
  - Total: 42.13 km^{2} (16.27 sq mi)
- Elevation: 9 m (30 ft)

Population (2025-12-31)
  - Total: 14,671
  - Density: 348.2/km^{2} (901.9/sq mi)
- Demonym: Jeveraner
- Time zone: UTC+01:00 (CET)
  - Summer (DST): UTC+02:00 (CEST)
- Postal codes: 26441
- Dialling codes: 04461
- Vehicle registration: FRI
- Website: www.stadt-jever.de

Jever (German pronunciation: [ˈjeːfɐ]) is the capital of the district of Friesland in Lower Saxony, Germany. The name Jever is usually associated with a major brand of beer, Jever Pilsener, which is produced there. The city is also a popular holiday resort. Jever was granted city status in 1536. Unofficially Jever is sometimes referred to as Marienstadt (Maria city) in reference to Maria of Jever, the last independent ruler of the city. The inhabitants of Jever are named Jeveraner ("Jeverans").

== Politics ==
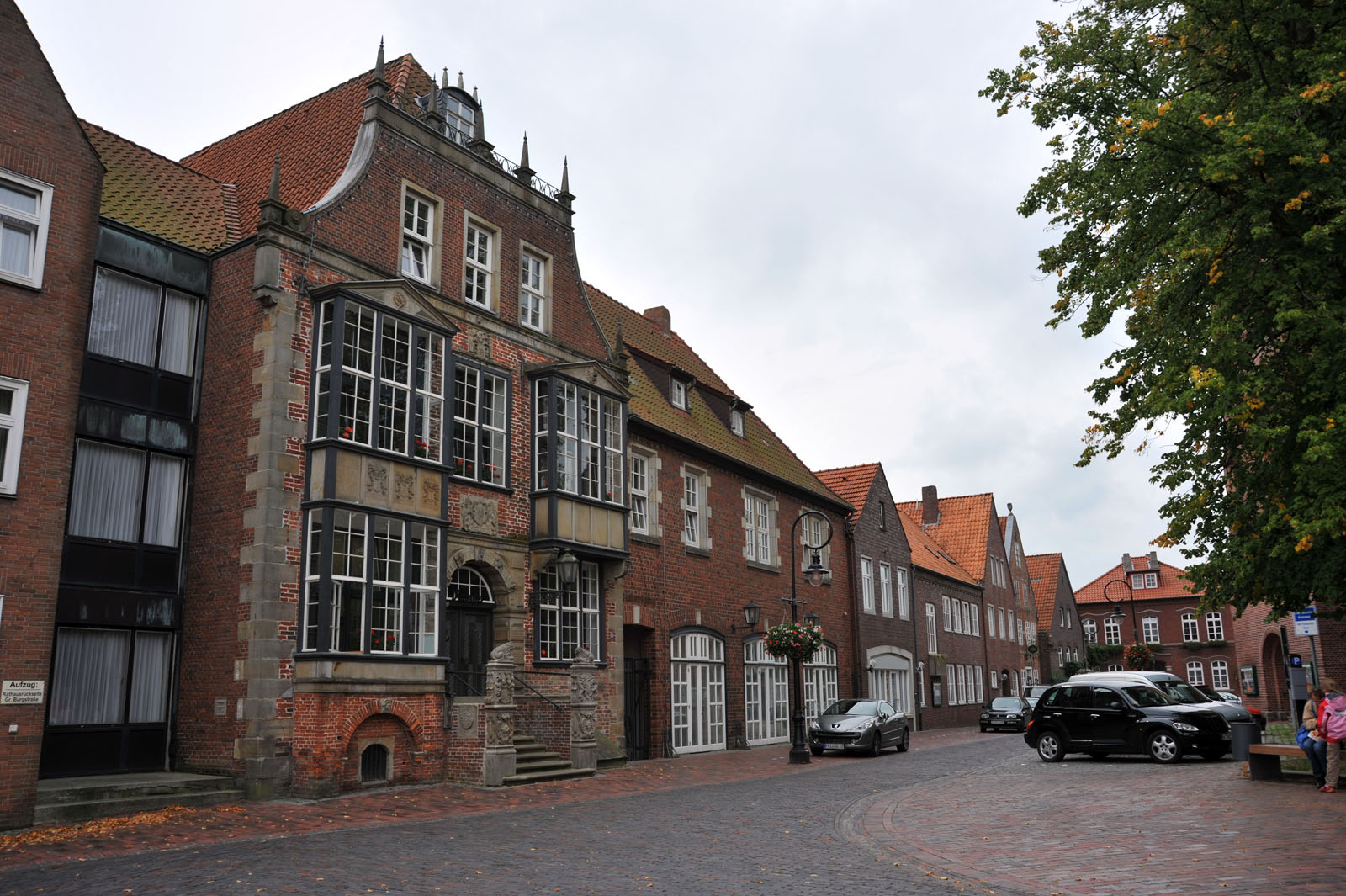
City Hall of Jever

=== City Council ===
The Jever City Council consists of 30 members—the fixed number for a town with a population of between 12,001 and 15,000 inhabitants. The 30 councillors are elected by local elections for a five-year term. The current term of office began on 1 November 2021 and ends on 31 October 2026

The full-time mayor Jan Edo Albers (Independent) is also entitled to vote in the city council.

The results of the last local elections, on 11 September 2016, are as follows. Deviations from the results of the local elections of 11 September 2011 are indicated in the third column.

Party	Percentage of votes	Difference from previous election	Seats	Difference from previous election
CDU	30.14 %	+ 4.42 %p	9	+1
SPD	28.88 %	+ 1.01 %p	9	+1
SWJ*	20.35 %	− 0.83 %p	6	±0
Grüne	11.91 %	− 2.49 %p	3	-1
FDP	8.69 %	+ 2.38 %p	3	+1

* - Social Voter Group of Jever and Friesland, a voter group

The voter turnout in the 2016 local elections was 56.19%, slightly above the Lower Saxony average of 55.5%. For comparison, the voter turnout was 53.43% in the previous local elections on 11 September 2011.

=== Mayors and town councillors ===
Since 12 November 2013, the Jever City Council has been headed by Mayor Jan Edo Albers (Independent). At the mayoral election on 6 October 2013, this jurist and former lawyer was elected full-time mayor. He won the run-off elections with 51.11%, narrowly beating the Independent candidate Dietmar Rüstmann with 48.88%. The turnout was 56.02%, compared with 74.75% in the first round of voting.

==== List of mayors of Jever ====
===== Mayors before 1945 =====
- 1919-1935: Georg Müller-Jürgens
- 1935-1945: Martin Folkerts

===== Voluntary mayors after World War II =====
- May 1945-July 1945: Christel Matthias Schröder; Schröder was a Protestant pastor who was appointed to the mayor's office by the British occupying power.
- July 1945-December 1945: Erich Kampf; appointed city director in Jever with the start of the twin-track administrative system
- 1945-1946: Hermann Klüsener
- 1946-1949: Alfred Onnen; elected to the German Bundestag in the federal elections on 14 August 1949
- 1949-1952: Hans Busch
- 1952-1961: Johann Albers; FDP politician in numerous functions (including district administrator of the Friesland district, member of the Lower Saxony state parliament, minister)
- 1961-1972: Ommo Ommen
- 1972-1975: Horst Dutge
- 1975-1976: Paul Müller
- 1976-1985: Paul Sillus
- 1985-1986: Heinz Behrends
- 1986-1996: Siegfried Harms
- 1996-2001: Margot Lorentzen; first female mayor of Jever
- 2001-2005: Siegfried Harms; last mayor of the twin-track administrative system

===== City directors after the introduction of the twin-track administrative system =====
- 1945-1950: Erich Kampf
- 1950-1957: Peter Oltmanns
- 1957-1963: Hans Neef
- 1963-1971: Fritz Hörnig
- 1971-1978: Wilhelm Hermann Greve
- 1978-1981: Christian Kuhle; interim city director
- 1981-2005: Ingo Hashagen; last city director of the twin-track administrative system

===== Full-time mayors =====
- 2005-2013: Angela Dankwardt
- since 2013: Jan Edo Albers

=== Representatives in Landtag and Bundestag ===
In the elections to the Lower Saxony Landtag, Jever is part of the Landtag Electoral District of Friesland, which covers the entire district of Friesland. The direct management was won on 15 October 2017 by Olaf Lies from the SPD. On 22 November 2017, Lies was elected Lower Saxony's Minister for Environment, Energy, Building and Climate Protection. The legislative period ends in 2022.

Jever belongs to the Bundestag constituency of Friesland – Wilhelmshaven – Wittmund. It includes the city of Wilhelmshaven and the districts of Friesland and Wittmund. Siemtje Möller (SPD) is the directly elected member of parliament. No party candidates from the constituency entered the Bundestag via party listings.

=== Coat of arms, flag, and banner ===
The coat of arms of Jever

The depictions of the town's coat of arms have changed several times over the centuries. The coats of arms have always been used in very different variations and colours. For this reason, at the end of the 1960s, the town commissioned the former head of the Oldenburg State Archives and recognised expert in heraldry, Hermann Lübbing, to design a contemporary representation of the coat of arms on the basis of historical traditions.

The result was the present coat of arms of the town with the following blazoning: "In blue above a silver, a sloping rampart with an open stepped gabled gate, three silver red-roofed towers, the central one being higher and wider than the side towers. The golden letters DVMG are harmoniously distributed over the spires of the towers. A golden lion strides upright in the archway, its claws and tongue tinged in red. On both sides of the gate stands a red plank fence."

The town gate with the three towers represents the original existing town fortifications of Jever. The lion is the symbol of the late medieval rule or the chieftains of Jever. The Latin letters DVMG recall the granting of the town charter in 1536 by Fräulein Maria von Jever. They stand for "Donat Urbi Maria Gubernacula", meaning "Ruler Mary gives the town status" in Latin.

The flag and banner can be described as such: "The flag or banner is blue-and-white-striped horizontally or vertically, with the coat of arms in the middle."

=== Twin cities ===
Jever is twinned with the following cities:

- Zerbst, Germany (1990)
- Cullera, Spain (1998)

== Geography ==
=== Geographical location and neighbouring municipalities ===
Jever is situated in Jeverland, part of the north-eastern part of the East Frisian peninsula, and is located near the coast of the North Sea in Lower Saxony, some 15 kilometres west of Wilhelmshaven and Jade Bight. Jever borders the municipality of Wangerland to the north, the town of Schortens to the east and south, and the town of Wittmund to the west. In the southwest, Jever briefly borders the East Frisian municipality of Friedeburg.

=== Urban structure ===
Since the local government reorganization of 1972, the town consists of the core town of Jever, into which the previously independent suburban area of Jever had already been incorporated in 1844, as well as the districts of Moorwarfen, Rahrdum, Cleverns, Sandel and Sandelermöns.

=== Geology ===
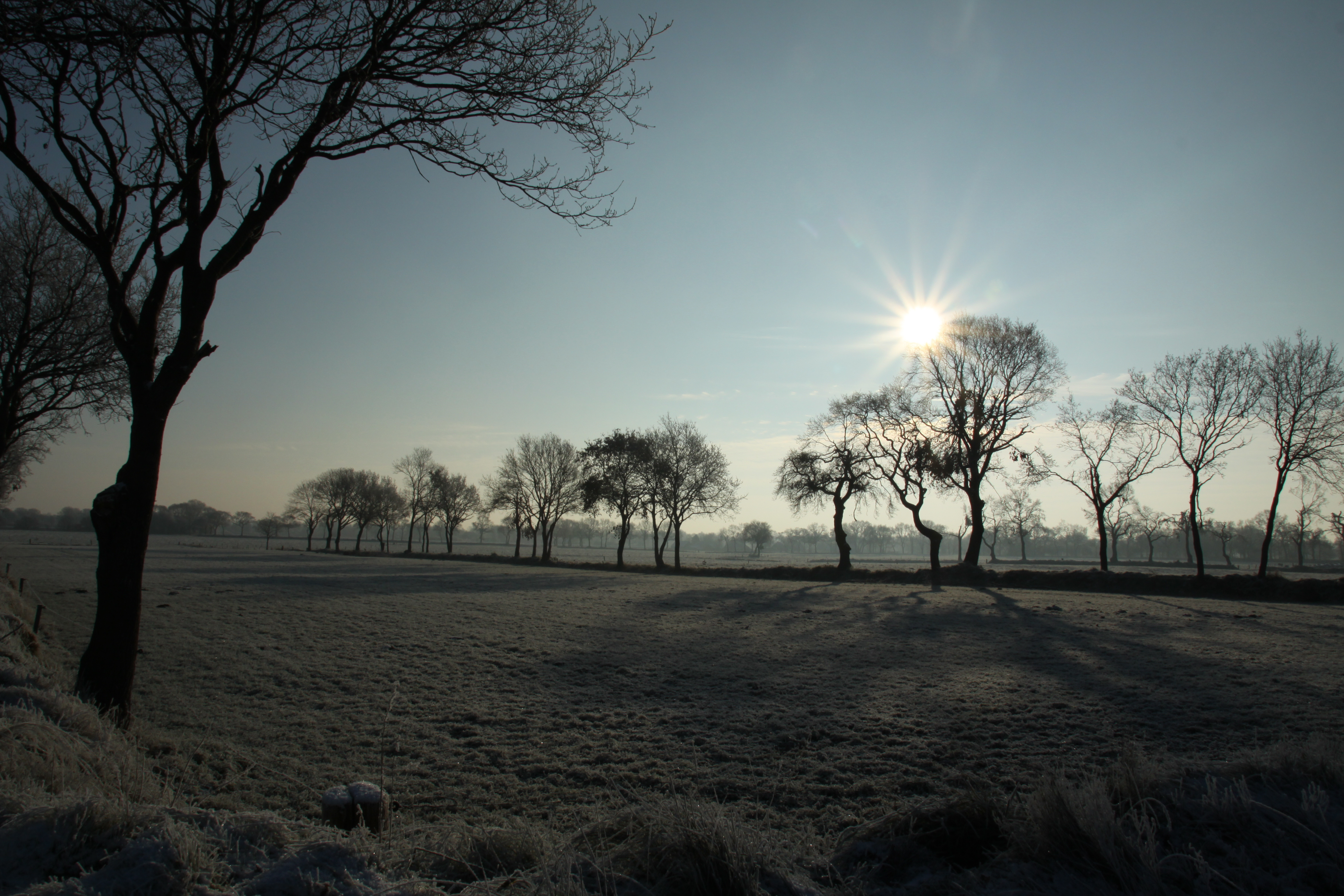
Wall hedges in the geest of Jever

The town is situated on a flat tongue of the Oldenburg-East Frisian geest, which rises 7 to 8 metres above the surrounding flat marshes of the Wangerland. The foothills were formed by sand deposits during the Ice Age. The Cleverns district is a typical landscape with a geest culture, which can be seen in the wall hedges. Towards the town border with Schortens, Jever has bogs which are protected under conservation.

=== Major bodies of water ===
Jever is surrounded by several interconnected tiefs. (A tief is a watercourse close to the sea, the bed of which is generally or largely below mean sea level. They are mainly used to drain lower areas behind dikes.) These include the Moorlandstief in the east, the Mühlentief in the west, and the Tettenser Tief and the Hooksieler Tief in the north. All of the tiefs in Jeverland flow into the North Sea via the Hohenstief Sieltief in Horumersiel.

Lake Moorwarfener, a former quarry pond which is managed by the Jever Fishing Club, is also located in the town area. The lake is located in the Jeveran district of Moorwarfen and covers around 17 hectares.

=== Climate ===
Jever has a temperate climate, under the direct influence of the North Sea. Daytime temperatures are lower in summer, and often higher in winter, than in the rest of the country. The climate as a whole is characterised by westerlies.

According to the Köppen climate classification system, Jever is in the classification Cfb. C stands for a warm temperate climate, fb for a humid temperate climate with warm summers.

The nearest weather station is in Hooksiel, 13 kilometres away.

Climate data for Jever, 1991–2020 normals, extremes 1931–2005
Month	Jan	Feb	Mar	Apr	May	Jun	Jul	Aug	Sep	Oct	Nov	Dec	Year
Record high °C (°F)	13.7 (56.7)	16.7 (62.1)	24.0 (75.2)	29.3 (84.7)	30.5 (86.9)	34.1 (93.4)	34.5 (94.1)	36.3 (97.3)	32.1 (89.8)	24.8 (76.6)	18.0 (64.4)	15.4 (59.7)	36.3 (97.3)
Mean maximum °C (°F)	11.0 (51.8)	12.2 (54.0)	16.2 (61.2)	21.5 (70.7)	25.0 (77.0)	28.8 (83.8)	29.6 (85.3)	30.5 (86.9)	23.5 (74.3)	18.8 (65.8)	13.3 (55.9)	11.5 (52.7)	32.2 (90.0)
Mean daily maximum °C (°F)	4.7 (40.5)	5.5 (41.9)	8.8 (47.8)	13.0 (55.4)	16.9 (62.4)	19.4 (66.9)	21.9 (71.4)	22.3 (72.1)	18.1 (64.6)	13.1 (55.6)	8.0 (46.4)	4.8 (40.6)	13.0 (55.4)
Daily mean °C (°F)	2.6 (36.7)	2.8 (37.0)	5.1 (41.2)	8.7 (47.7)	12.4 (54.3)	15.1 (59.2)	17.5 (63.5)	17.7 (63.9)	13.9 (57.0)	9.5 (49.1)	5.5 (41.9)	2.5 (36.5)	9.4 (48.9)
Mean daily minimum °C (°F)	−0.1 (31.8)	−0.1 (31.8)	1.8 (35.2)	4.2 (39.6)	8.0 (46.4)	10.8 (51.4)	13.5 (56.3)	13.5 (56.3)	10.4 (50.7)	6.2 (43.2)	2.7 (36.9)	0.0 (32.0)	5.9 (42.6)
Mean minimum °C (°F)	−8.7 (16.3)	−8.1 (17.4)	−3.2 (26.2)	−2.3 (27.9)	2.0 (35.6)	5.5 (41.9)	8.7 (47.7)	8.6 (47.5)	5.3 (41.5)	−0.7 (30.7)	−3.7 (25.3)	−8.2 (17.2)	−11.1 (12.0)
Record low °C (°F)	−18.0 (−0.4)	−23.9 (−11.0)	−15.5 (4.1)	−7.5 (18.5)	−1.7 (28.9)	2.1 (35.8)	3.8 (38.8)	2.5 (36.5)	0.1 (32.2)	−5.4 (22.3)	−13.2 (8.2)	−15.8 (3.6)	−23.9 (−11.0)
Average precipitation mm (inches)	61.5 (2.42)	53.3 (2.10)	53.2 (2.09)	46.1 (1.81)	57.2 (2.25)	82.5 (3.25)	85.5 (3.37)	77.5 (3.05)	98.9 (3.89)	82.1 (3.23)	68.6 (2.70)	81.2 (3.20)	847.5 (33.37)
Average extreme snow depth cm (inches)	3.7 (1.5)	4.6 (1.8)	2.1 (0.8)	0.1 (0.0)	0 (0)	0 (0)	0 (0)	0 (0)	0 (0)	0.1 (0.0)	0.8 (0.3)	4.6 (1.8)	8.5 (3.3)
Average precipitation days (≥ 0.1 mm)	19.4	17.4	16.8	15.6	15.1	17.2	16.1	16.1	18.0	19.0	20.1	19.4	210.2
Average relative humidity (%)	85.3	83.3	79.6	74.1	74.4	74.8	75.6	76.4	81.0	83.8	87.9	87.5	80.3
Mean monthly sunshine hours	51.3	73.2	118.2	173.6	220.2	203.3	223.2	218.1	145.2	110.2	54.5	42.8	1,633.9
Source: Deutscher Wetterdienst/SKlima.de

== History ==
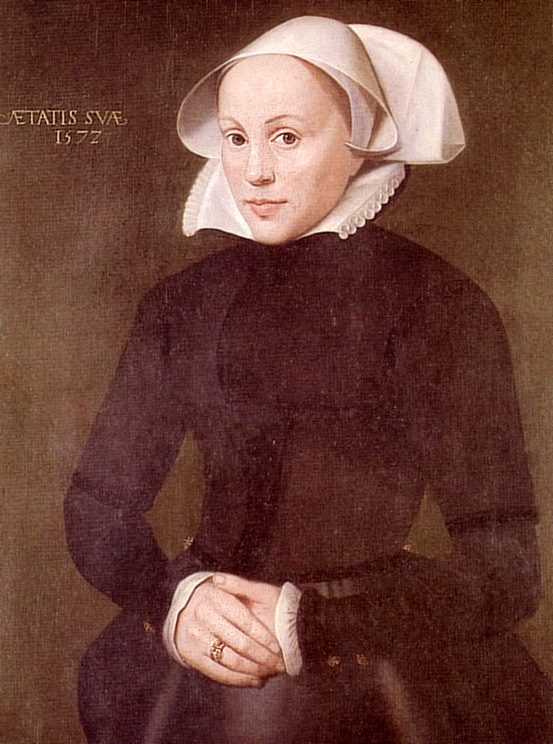
Painting of Maria of Jever, 1572

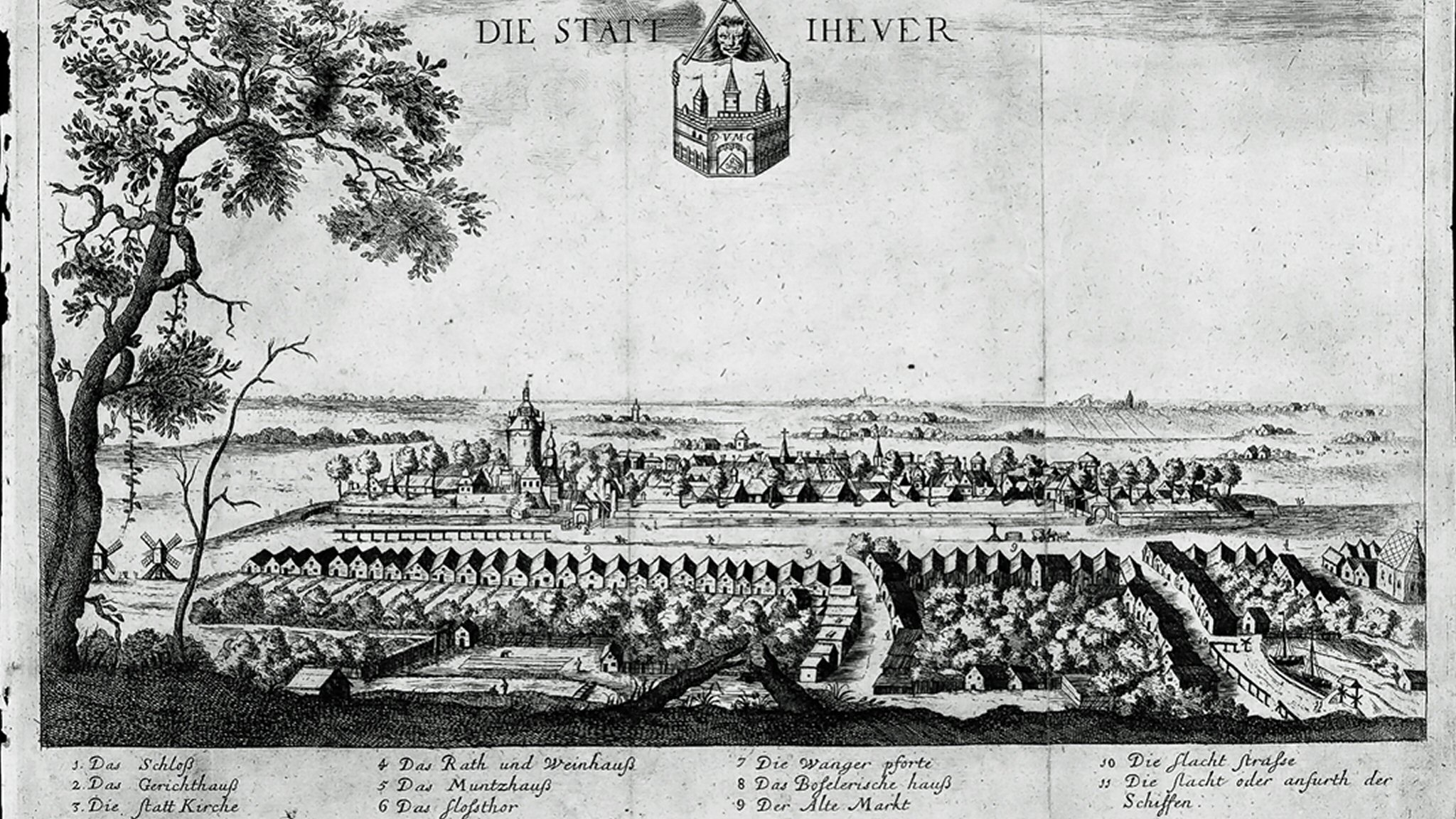
Jever's harbor, c. 1651

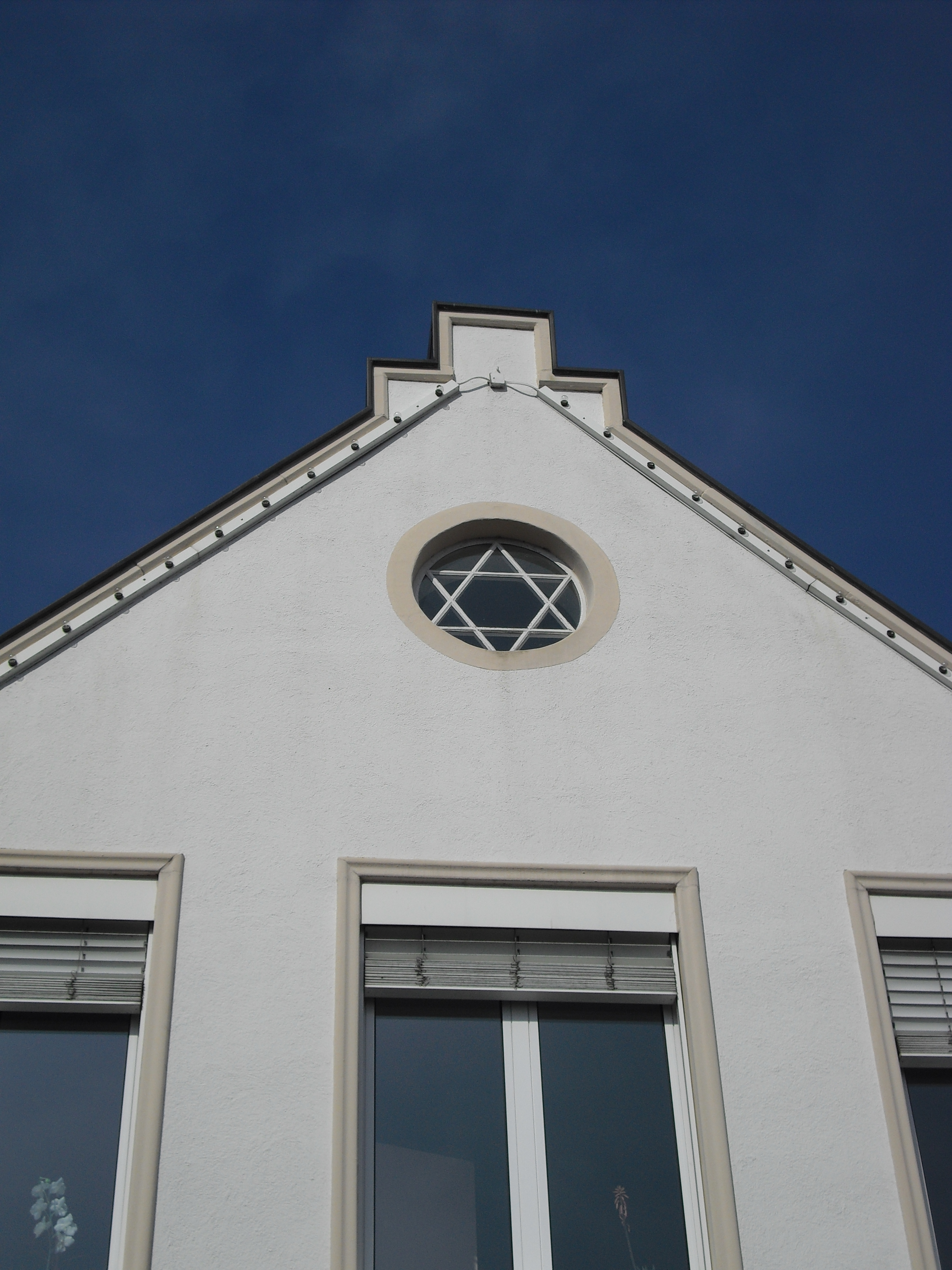
The Star of David in the gable of a house

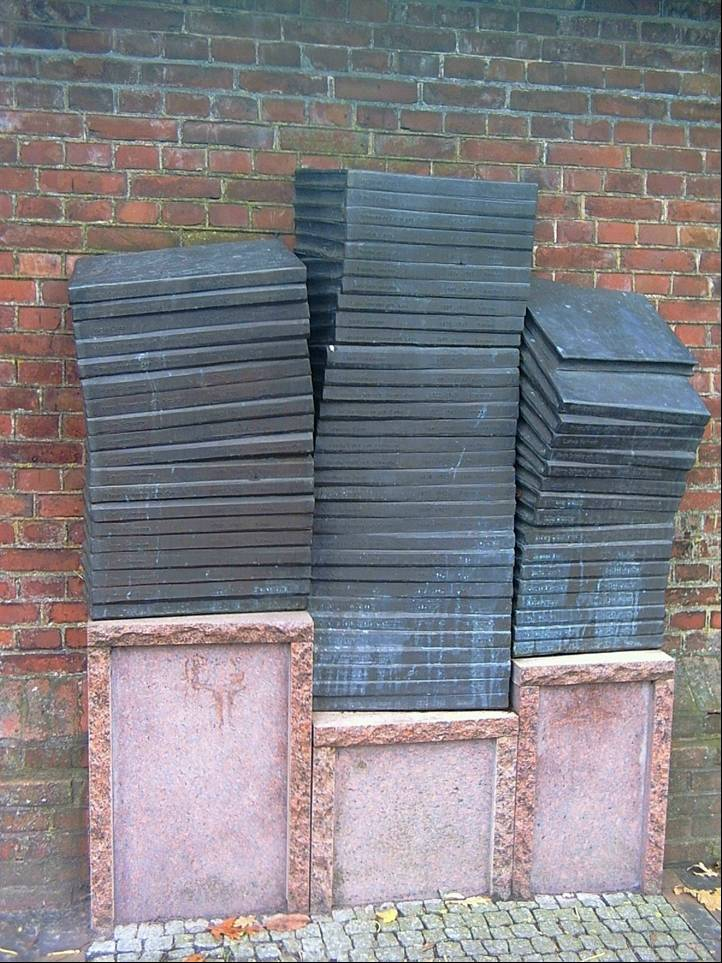
Holocaust memorial

Archaeological findings in the vicinity of Jever suggest that the area has been inhabited since the Neolithic era. A dolmen was located near the town up until at least 1880 but was removed sometime at the end of the 19th century due to farming expansion. In addition to this tools such as a flint dagger and sickle have been found in the Jever area. From later periods around the 6th century BCE there has also been a number of urns uncovered as well as a bronze spear tip and socket axe.

During the Roman period the Chauci had a settlement in the area of Jever. Around 826 Frisia was given by Louis the Pious to the Danish King Harald Klak following his conversion to Christianity, Harald had sought refuge at Louis’ court after being driven from his homeland. The 9th century epic Gudrunlied mentions the Danish dominion of Friesland and contains a reference to “Givers” in the area of Sande which is probably the first record of Jever. A further reference in 1158 notes a town by the name of "Geverae", the latinisiation of the low German Geveren or Gaveren ("pasture", or alternatively "Place of the Thing").

Coins stamped in Jever have been found as far afield as the Finnish Gulf and Warta in Poland which serves as testament to Jever importance as a trading town. during the 10th and 11th centuries Jever was a port and had access to the North Sea via both the Jade and the Harlebucht. Over time however land movements meant the access to the sea disappeared and the later construction of dikes has now left Jever well inland. Nevertheless, Jever retained importance as a trading post. In 1546 Hooksiel became an outer harbour for Jever and with the extension of paved roads from Jever to Hooksiel the need for even small ships to sail to Jever was abolished. Today in the centre of Jever a children's playground with a climbing frame in the shape of a ship serves as a reminder of the city's important maritime past.

Saxon Dukes and subsequently the House of Welf later ruled over Jever, finally at the end of the 12th century, Jever came under the control of Oldenburg. A letter sent to King Philip III of France, details that between 1271 and 1285, the people of Östringer were subject to no sovereign, but that they selected their own judges and chiefs themselves (see Frisian freedom).

Jever was granted rights as a town in 1347. Around the turn of the 15th century the town continued to be a prosperous trading center; this attracted not only merchants but also pirates. The most famous of the pirates was a band who were known as the "Likedeeler", and included Klaus Störtebeker and Goedeke Michels.

The last Baron of the Jeverland was Edo Wiemken who, in 1505, completed the reconstruction of the castle and is buried in the city church. After Edo's death Jever came under the control of Graf Edward I. However Maria of Jever, the daughter of Edo restored the city's independence, and in 1536 whilst under her rule Jever received its city rights which has led to the city's unofficial title as "Marienstadt".

Maria died in 1575 but her death was kept secret for fear of a return of the East Frisians. Instead, Jever became one of Oldenburg's territories by last will of Maria. In 1667 Jever was through distaff passed under control of the Anhalt-Zerbst. After Prince Frederick August, who had supported the British in the American Revolutionary War for financial reasons, died in 1793, the male-line of Anhalt-Zerbst perished and its territories were split. Jeverland was then inherited by Catherine II of Russia, formerly Princess Sophia of Anhalt-Zerbst and Frederick August's sole surviving sibling. It remained Russian until Napoleon's armies occupied it in 1807. Between 1808 and 1810 it was part of the Kingdom of Holland, a Napoleonic vassal state. When the French were forced to withdraw in 1813, Russia regained possession of Jever and gave it to the new grand dukes of Oldenburg in 1818.

Jever was connected to the railway network in 1871 by a line from Sande. From 1881, a line connected it westwards to Wittmund, Esens and Dornum, and from 1888 there was a line northwards to Carolinensiel. The railway station in Jever still has a waiting room for the exclusive use of the Dukes of Oldenburg to this day.

Because Anhalt-Zerbst had guaranteed security and freedom of business for Jews, Jever became a center of Jewish life in Frisia, reaching its peak in the late 19th century. After that many youngsters left for larger cities where they hoped to find better economic opportunities (and since the 1920s also to escape growing anti-semitism). This caused the community to shrink to only half of its former size: by 1933, there were only 98 Jews left in Jever. The synagogue (inaugurated in 1802) was completely destroyed in the Night of Broken Glass, and at least 63 Jever Jews were killed in the Holocaust.

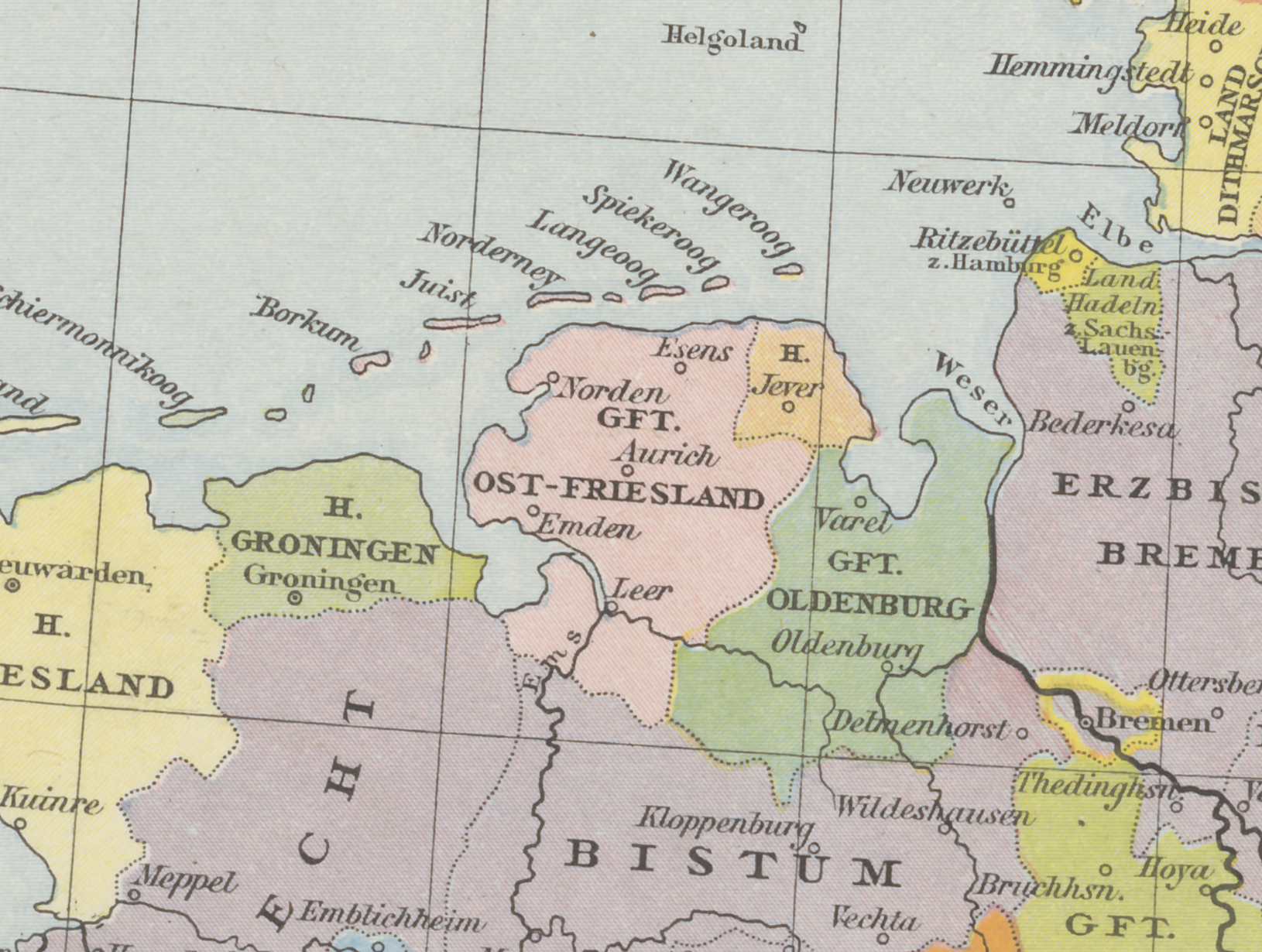
The Herrschaft Jever, ca. 1500

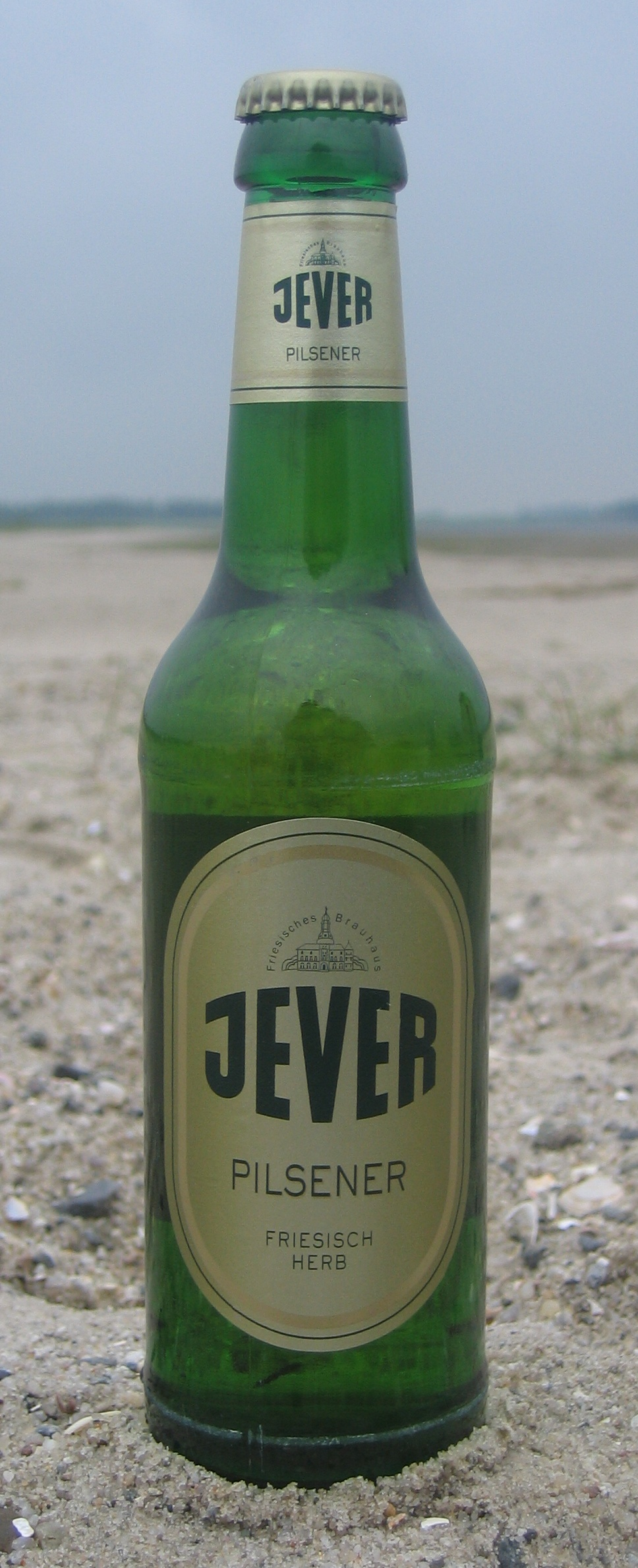
A bottle of Jever beer

=== Incorporations ===
On 1 July 1972, the neighbouring municipality of Cleverns-Sandel was incorporated into Jever.

=== Population growth ===
Population development of Jever from 1785 to 2017

The population of Jever, from 1939 to 1 January, increased significantly after the Second World War due to the influx of displaced persons. A further leap occurred in 1972 after the former Cleverns-Sandel community was incorporated into the town of Jever.

In 2015, the proportion of foreigners was 3.92 percent. They come from 64 nations, most of them from the former Yugoslavia, followed by Italians and former citizens of the Soviet Union.

- Year	Population
  ca. 1785	ca. 2,785
  1825	3,363
  1833	3,517
  1875	4,054
  1925	6,042
  1939	7,032
- Year	Population
  1945	7,661
  1950	10,972
  1955	10,364
  1960	9,938
  1965	10,028
  1970	10,435
- Year	Population
  1975	12,153
  1980	12,628
  1985	12,820
  1990	12,848
  1995	13,500
  2000	13,782
- Year	Population
  2005	14,191
  2010	14,189
  2015	14,020
  2017	14,207

== Points of interest ==
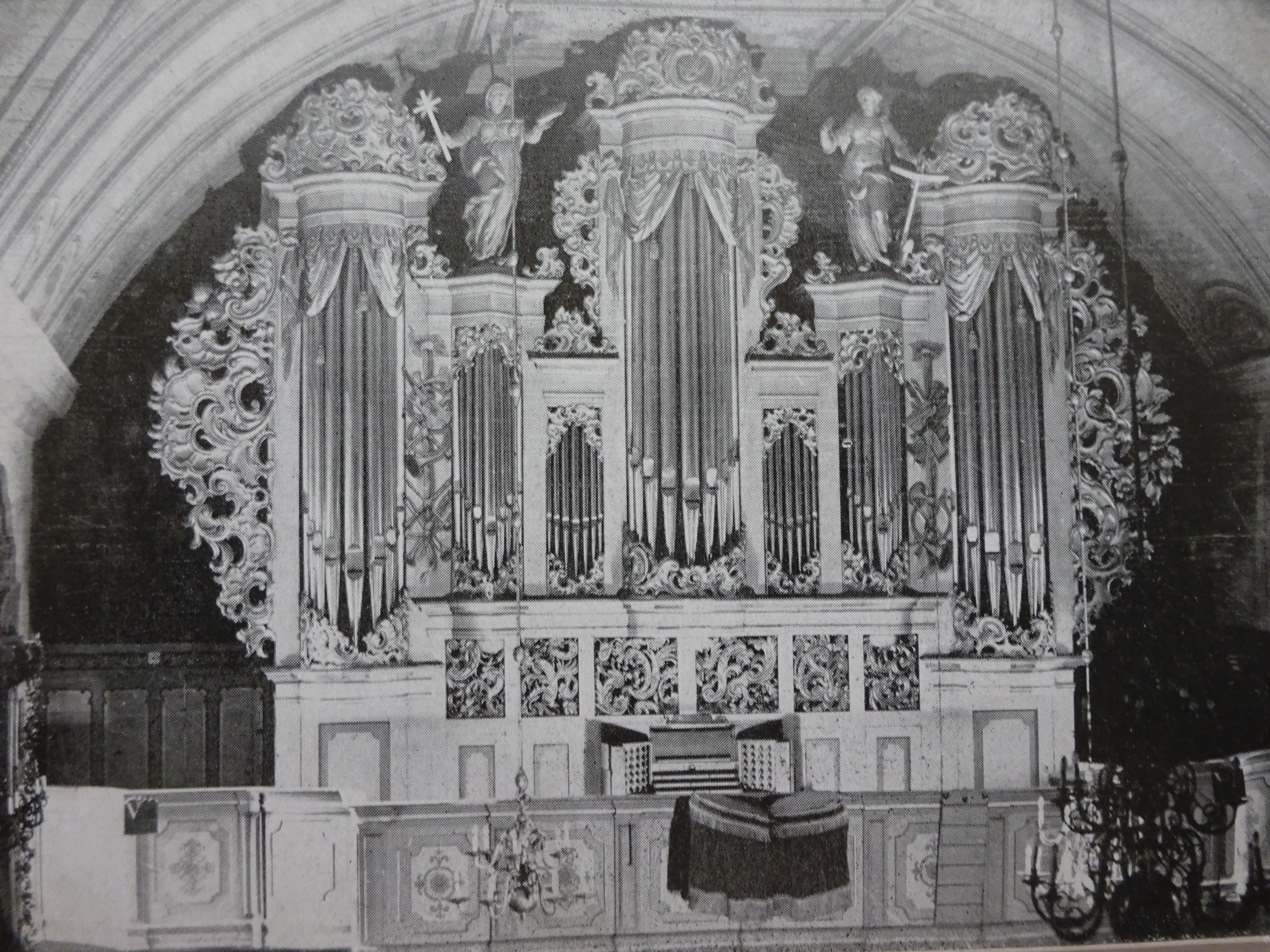
The Bernese organ in the town church

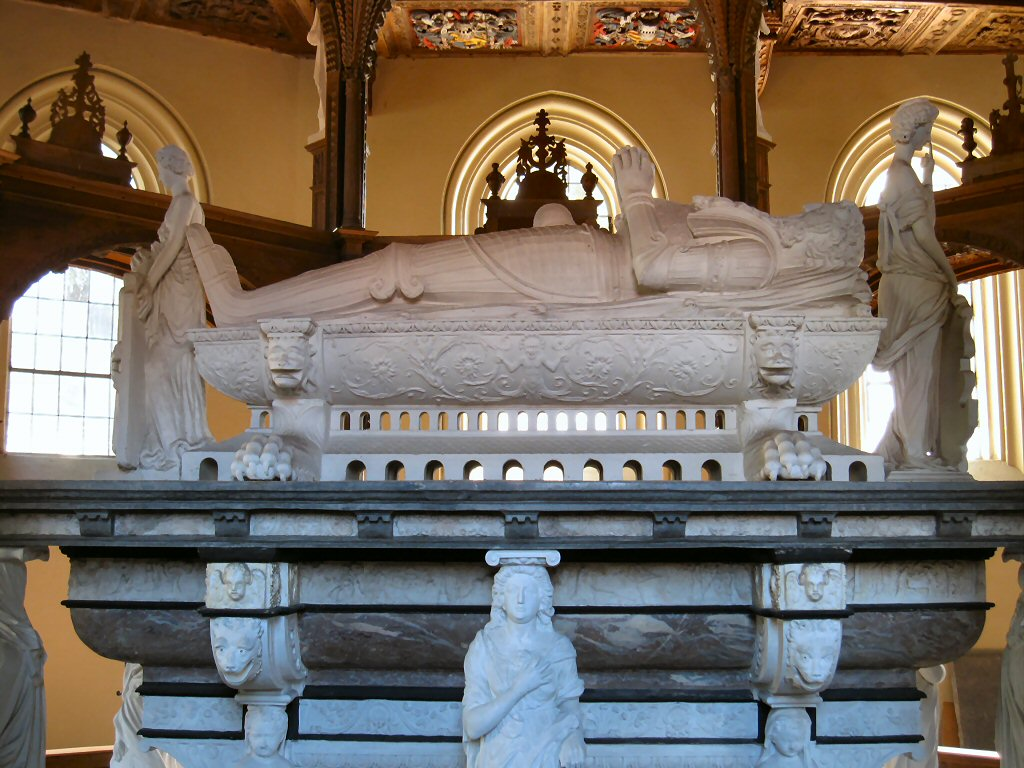
The Edo-Wiemken Monument in the town church of Jever

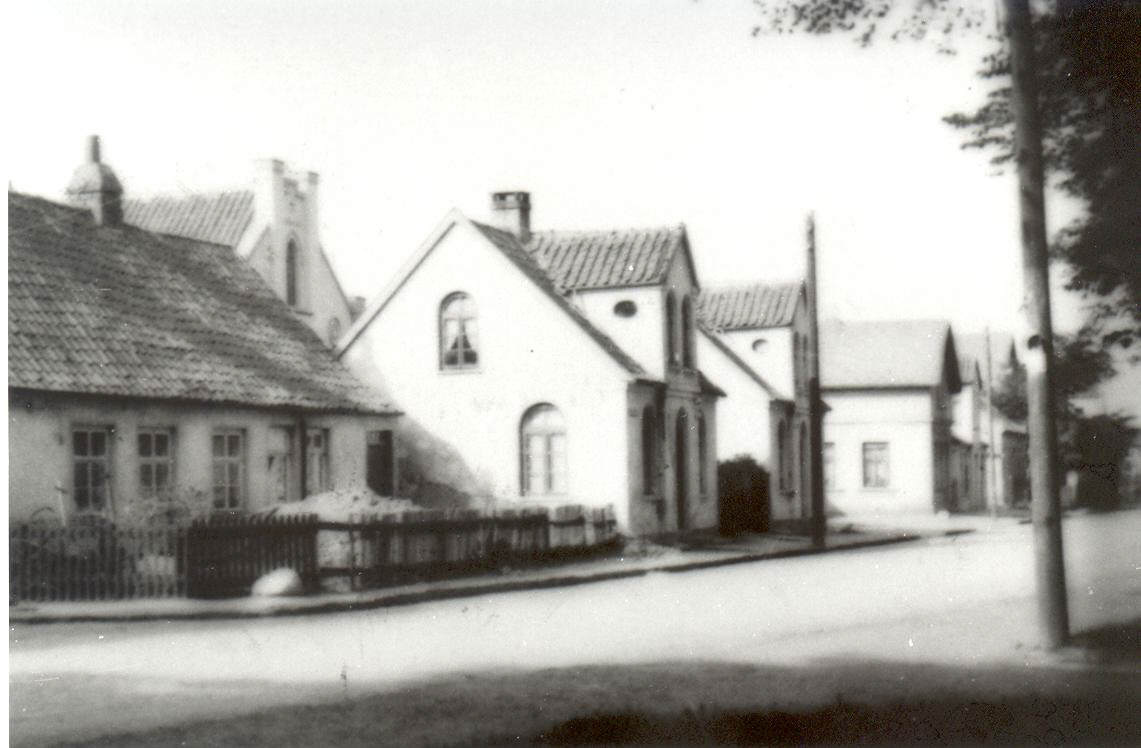
The prayer house as a backyard building; in the foreground two small houses (about 1920)

Jever offers a variety of historical, cultural, technical and also botanical monuments, which refer to the different epochs of the history of the Jever area, spanning over 1,000 years. The city offers guided tours of the town and churches. In addition, there are several museums that concentrate on a specific theme, or offer changing special exhibitions in addition to a main theme.

=== Sacred buildings ===
==== Old church ====
The Evangelical Lutheran town church stands on the church square in Jever, on the site of its predecessor churches. When the previous church on this site had burnt down, the new building, was consecrated in 1736. It subsequently burned down on 1 October 1959. This fire also destroyed the three-manual organ built by Johann Adam Berner in 1750–1756. The Amsterdam merchant Diedrich Garlichs, born in Neuende, had donated it.

==== New church ====
In 1964 the present church was built, a modern, strongly staggered central building, connected to the preserved apse of the destroyed church. Seen from a distance, the building gives the impression of a "city crown". Dieter Oesterlen (1911-1994), the architect, stated that his intention was "to clearly separate listed buildings from new buildings". According to him, "both structures come to their own architectural effect". The sandstone framing of the entrance portal and the baptismal font are from the previous church. The organ in the town church is the work of the Wilhelmshaven organ builder Alfred Führer. It has 47 stops and mechanical action. The disposition of the instrument was designed by the Jeverian cantor Günter Maurischat, and the prospectus of the organ was made according to a design by Dieter Oesterlen.

The church interior can accommodate about 800 people attending church services. In the aforementioned historical apse is the listed Edo-Wiemken monument, which commemorates the last male East Frisian chief of the Jeverland and has already survived two fires in the course of history. It was commissioned by Fräulein Maria, the daughter of Edo Wiemken, and was created between 1561 and 1564 by students of the Antwerp sculptor Cornelis Floris. It is considered an important example of Dutch Renaissance art.

==== St.-Annen-Kapelle ====
St.-Annen-Kapelle is the oldest preserved church in the town of Jever. It was built in 1610, but "again completely renovated and improved by Harmen Warner and Jakob Hanke, currently members of the Jever church jury" only fifty years later. One of these improvements is probably the polygonal choir screen, which archaeological research showed the chapel did not receive until 1660. The interior of the church is a light-flooded apse hall. It is 16 metres long and seven metres wide. In the construction of the St. Anne's Chapel, younger bricks as well as bricks in the so-called monastery format were used, which probably came from the rubble of the Oestringfelde monastery.

The altar is also worthy of note, the top of which was painted in rural style in 1703. On the left wing, Moses is depicted in front of the raised serpent and on the right wing, the crucified Jesus Christ. Among the representations on the altar wings there is an inscription: And as Moses lifted up the serpent in the wilderness, even so must the Son of man be lifted up. (The Gospel of John, chapter 3, verse 14). The central part of the altarpiece is composed of four carved and coloured panels with scenes from the legendary life of St. George. The chapel served in earlier times as a suburban church and today it is almost exclusively a cemetery chapel. The cemetery surrounding it was already mentioned in 1665 as Capellen-Kirchacker, but was currently only reserved as a burial place for suburbanites and members of the garrison. After the cemetery surrounding the town church was abolished in 1803, the Capellen-Kirchacker became the cemetery of the town of Jever, which has been extended several times since then.

==== Baptist Prayer House ====
The Baptist Prayer House in Jever was built in 1858 and is one of the oldest Baptist church buildings in Germany and the second oldest in Jever. The prayer house is still used for worship services today. It is located outside the historic centre of Jever on the banks of the Elisabeth River in the so-called St. Annen suburb. Until the 1950s, two small residential buildings were located in the present car park in front of the prayer house. They had to be erected in front of the church, as free-church places of worship were only permitted as backyard buildings in the 19th century.

==== St.-Marien-Kirche ====
The Roman Catholic Church of St. Mary is built in the Cubist style. Its tower contains four bells and measures 23 metres. A small chapel located in the former sacristy is used as a place of worship for masses on weekdays.

=== Secular buildings ===
==== Jever Castle ====
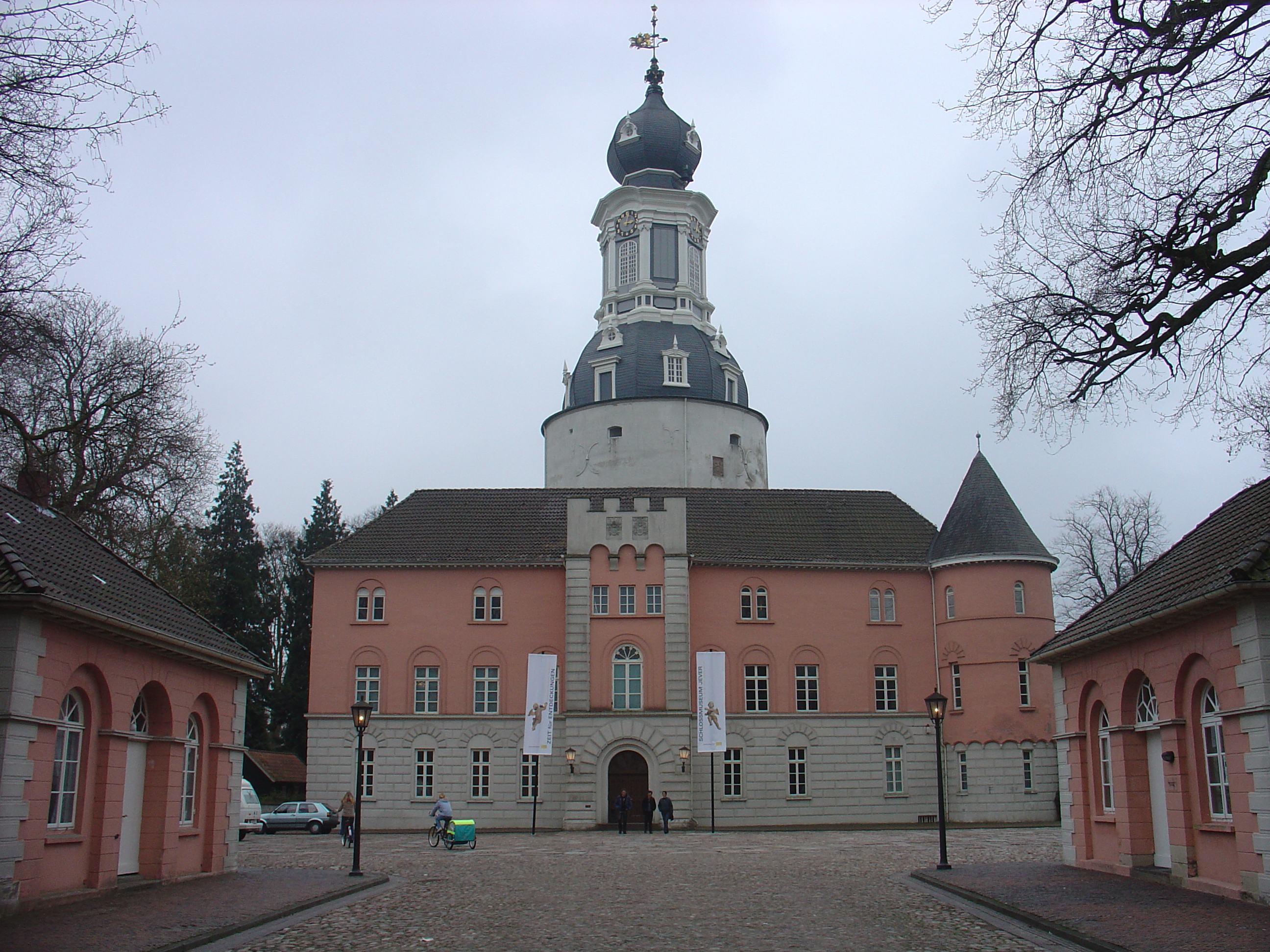
Jever castle

Jever Castle was built from a fortified complex from the 14th century. The castle was the seat of the Jever Dominion. Its centre was a mighty Bergfried, which from the 16th century onwards was integrated into a four-wing castle complex surrounded by moats and ramparts. From 1560 to 1564, the then-regent Maria von Jever had various alterations carried out in the Renaissance style. It is the most important secular building in the city. Since 1921 the castle has been home to the Castle Museum. It displays exhibits on the cultural history, folklore and archaeology of the Jeverland.

==== Town Hall ====
The town hall of Jever was built in 1609-1616 by the master Albert von Bentheim. The original Dutch gable was replaced in 1836 by the present, much simpler finish. In 1963 the town hall was almost completely demolished due to deterioration, and replaced by a new building. Only the outer façade could be preserved in the new building. The top of the gable also had to be removed and replaced.

Part of the façade is featured in the city's coat of arms with the inscription Donat Urbi Maria Gubernacula, meaning "Mary gives the town the power to govern".

In front of the town hall is one of the oldest public fountains, the Ratspütt.

==== Residential buildings ====
In the old town there are numerous well-preserved residential buildings. Despite some demolitions (especially on St. Annenstrasse and Lindenbaumstrasse), and renovation measures on Hopfenzaun and Drostenstrasse, to which the Drostenhaus, among others, fell victim in 1975, the old character of the inner city with its often plastered brick buildings has been largely preserved. Typical are the numerous high-quality sandstone portals of the 18th and 19th centuries. A larger number of historic houses can be found in the area of the church square. Particularly noteworthy is the Schwarzer Bär inn located at Kirchplatz 14, a two-storey brick building dating from 1562. The house at Am Kirchplatz 1 is dated 1661 and the house at Am Kirchplatz 9, not far from the town hall, with its bell-gable, was built in 1715. The Rococo portal, which does not belong to the building, was not added until 1934, however, when the previously brick-faced façade was plastered.

In the nearby Wangerstrasse 8 there is a granary built in 1650 with centrally located loading hatches. The building at Wangerstrasse 14 (today the headquarters of the Brune-Mettcker publishing house) was built in 1823 on part of the filled up moat as a town weighhouse and public house. A particularly impressive building is the former Löwenapotheke pharmacy in Apothekerstrasse 1. The house, which is older in its core, goes back in its present form to the pharmacist Johann Carl Christian Sprenger, who acquired the southern gabled house in 1798 and connected it with the neighbouring house. Of the Drostenhaus already mentioned, only the portal, dated 1756, remained, which was integrated into the new building at Hopfenstrasse 2. Other portals are located at Am Kirchplatz 17 (mid-18th century) and at the houses Schlossstrasse 4 (1754), Wangerstrasse 10 (1765) and Wangerstraße 13 (1823).

Some remarkable residential buildings have also been preserved outside the fortified town centre. At Schlachtstraße 1 is the so-called Haus der Getreuen (House of the Faithful), which has a sandstone portal in Rococo style. It was probably built in the first half of the 18th century and was extended by a window axis in the west before 1890.

One of the most important buildings of Classicism in Jever is the house at Mühlenstraße 1, which is today the headquarters of the Oldenburgische Landesbank. It was built around 1850 by the merchant Diesendorf and has a triaxial central avant-corps, which is divided by Corinthian pilasters.

==== "Hof von Oldenburg" ====
The prominent building "Hof von Oldenburg" at Alter Markt 14 is a historic restaurant, built in 1798 as one of the first buildings outside the city's defences. A carillon at the "Hof von Oldenburg", inaugurated in April 1983, recalls the most important rulers of the Jeverland several times a day. They appear in the following order: Edo Wiemken the Younger, Mary of Jever, Count Anton Günther, Prince Johann August of Anhalt-Zerbst and Tsarina Catherine II of Russia; all of them bearing various insignia of their rule over Jever. The 16 bells of the carillon play different folk tunes to the circulation of the figures. The carillon, made by the Korfhage tower clock factory in Melle, was donated by Jacobus Eden, who later became an honorary citizen of the town.

==== Blaudruckerei Jever ====
Since the 1980s, the Blaudruckerei Jever has been located in an old warehouse building in Kattrepel street. It is one of the few places in Germany where the traditional craft of old East Frisian and North German Blaudrucks (blue printing) is still practiced. Fabrics are dyed by hand with indigo blue and then washed until white blue print patterns appear on a blue background. In the print shop's workshop, visitors can learn about the craft and watch the individual steps in the process.

==== Schlachtmühle ====
In 1846, the Schlachtmühle, a two-storey smock mill, was built in the centre of Jever. The mill is situated on the Friesische Mühlenstraße.

==== Friesisches Brauhaus ====
The Friesisches Brauhaus has been brewing the beer of the same name since 1848. With its modern production facilities, the brewery employs around 270 people and fills around 60,000 bottles of Jever beer per hour. The brewery's mirrored fermentation towers on the banks of the Elisabeth River contain five tanks of 240,000 litres each, in which the young beer is stored at -1 °C for three to four weeks before bottling. The brewery offers guided tours of the production facility by appointment. The tour also includes a walk through the adjoining historical brewery museum. Here you will get an insight into the everyday life of a brewery as it was about 100 years ago. In 2007 more than 33,000 guests took the opportunity to visit the brewery.

=== Museums ===
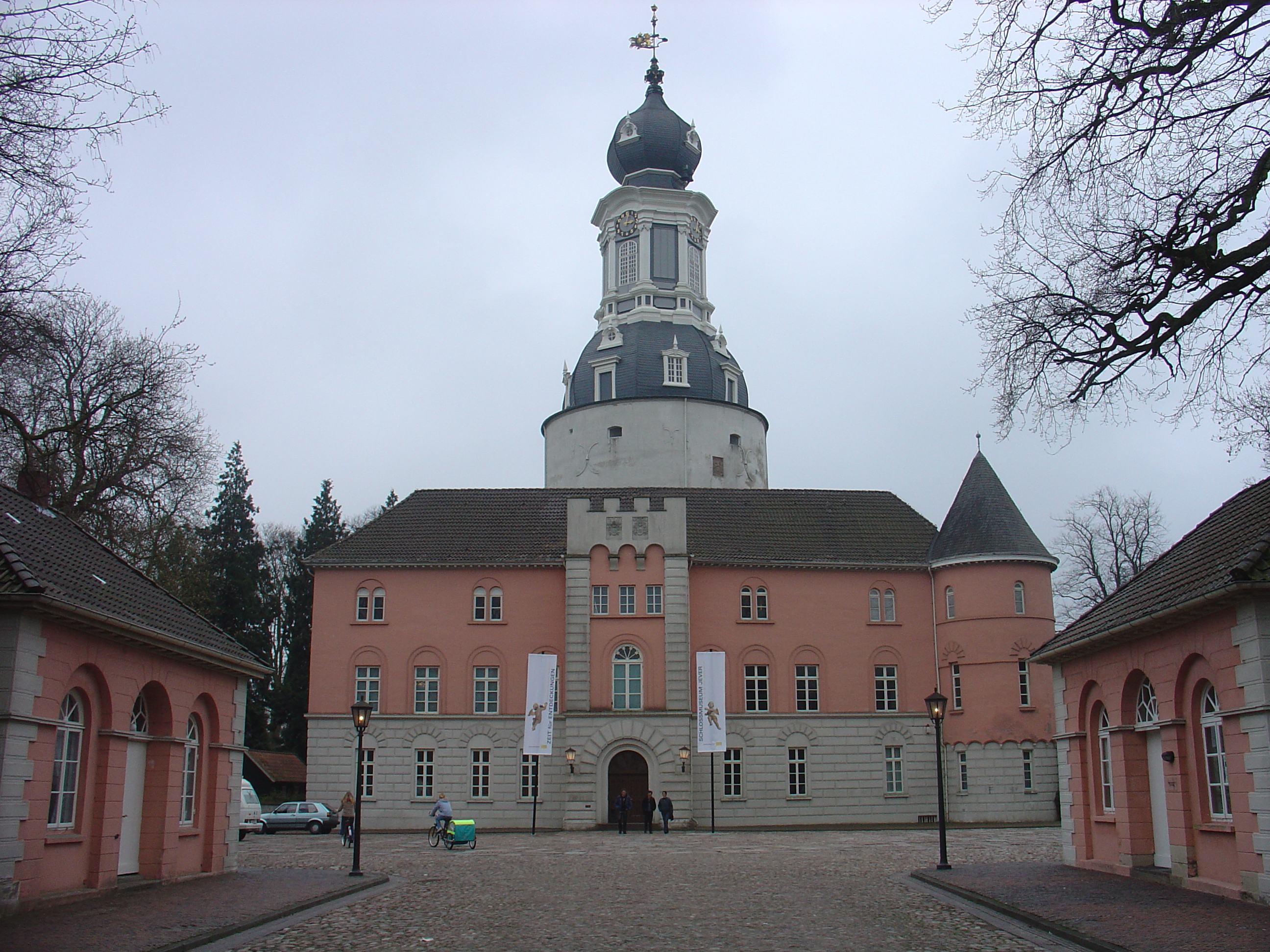
Jever castle

The Jever Castle Museum, of cultural history, presents information on the history of Jever Castle, where it has been located since 1921. It also has collections on the cultural and regional history of Jeverland.

The Historical Brewery Museum attached to the Friesisches Brauhaus shows how beer was brewed a good hundred years ago. A tour of today's modern brewery under the guidance of an expert will show you how time-consuming and labour-intensive it was to produce a few bottles of beer. The tours, which last a good two hours, are only possible by prior arrangement.

The Bismarck Museum of The Faithful of Jever has been located on Wangerstrasse in Jever since December 2004. The private museum shows an exhibition with about 400 exhibits about the Prussian Chancellor Otto von Bismarck and Prussian history. Among the exhibits are items from Bismarck's personal possessions as well as art objects, historical postcards and photographs and objects of daily use with his portrait. With the museum, the Faithful of Jever are continuing a Jeversche tradition which began as a regular meeting of Jeversche citizens in the inn "Haus der Getreuen" and consisted of sending Bismarck 101 lapwing eggs each year on his birthday. The Faithful are still active today and meet annually on Bismarck's birthday on 1 April in the inn "Haus der Getreuen", which is opposite the Bismarck Museum.

Another museum in Jever is the Jever Fire Museum. It is located near the railway station and uses the former railway freight building. In addition to exhibits about Jever's fire brigade history, the centrepiece of which is a vintage fire engine, the museum presents annually changing exhibitions on various fire fighting topics.

=== Parks and green spaces ===
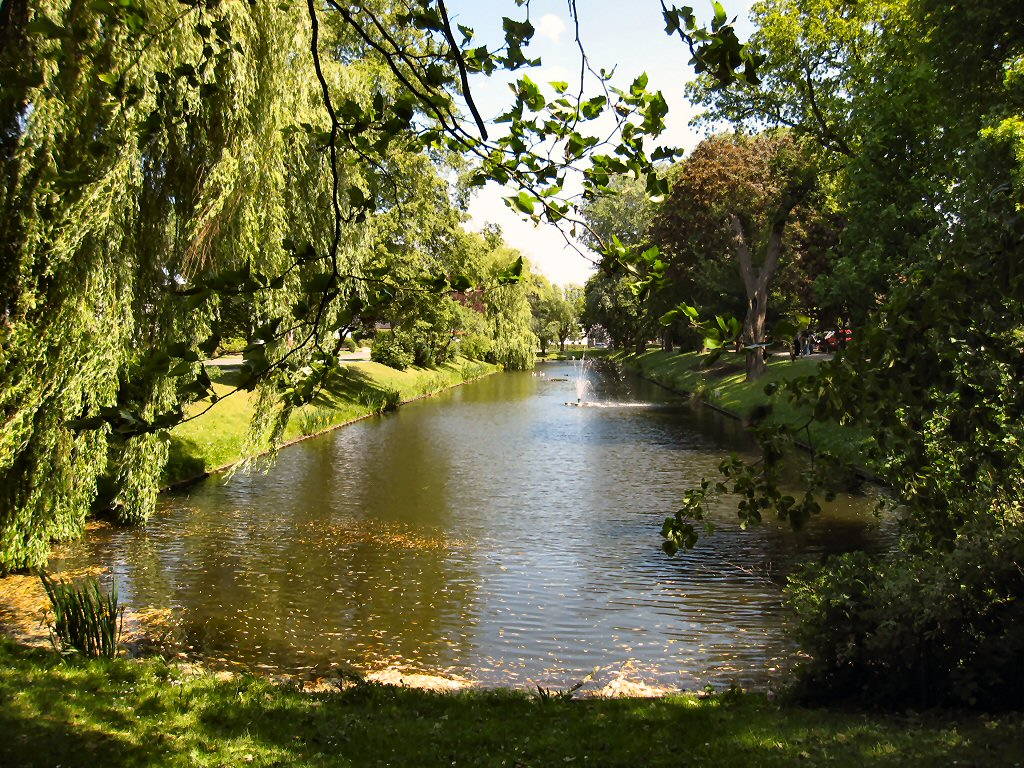
One of Jever's Graften

The townscape of Jever is strongly influenced by the five Graften that surround the historic centre. The original ring-shaped Gräfte was built in 1536, together with earthen walls to protect the newly appointed town. Three wooden town gates with bridges in front of them made it possible to pass through this fortification. At the beginning of the 19th century, the earth walls were removed and instead of the gates with their bridges, the canals were filled up with earth for crossing. All that remained were the Graften, which were ditches in front of the ramparts.

The five remaining separate Graften (moats) are the Duhmsgraft and the Pferdegraft on the Elisabethufer, the two-part Blankgraft on the Von-Thünen-Ufer, the Prinzengraft near the Kreisamtsgebäude, and the Schlossgraft, which forms a separate ring-shaped moat complex around Jever Castle. Viewed from above, the Graften surrounding the town and the castle form a figure-eight shape. Containing green spaces and mature trees, the waterways form a green belt around the historic old town and are used for recreation.

The layout of the present Castle Park, near Jever Castle, dates back to 1838. It was modelled after the so-called English landscape gardens, which developed in form and style in 18th century England. In addition to well-known European hardwoods (e.g. beech, oak, lime), the castle park also offers exotic woods. These include the North American tulip tree, the Southeast Asian katsura tree and the dawn redwood from southwest China.

The Castle Park also offers birdwatching. The Jever Castle Museum has a list of over 80 bird species.

== Culture ==
Jever offers a wide range of cultural facilities and events. Sponsorship lies partly with the public sector, and partly with associations and private initiatives. Below is a selection of the offers.

=== Theatre and Art ===
Jever is the venue of the Landesbühne Niedersachsen Nord (LBNN), which presents about ten productions in the city throughout the year. After the inadequate stage conditions no longer permitted the use of larger stage sets in the Concerthaus from the 1970s onwards, the Theater am Dannhalm, with 352 seats, was specifically designed as a venue for the Landesbühne.

Künstlerforum Jever e. V., an association for the promotion of art and culture in the Friesland region, was founded in 1989. The Artists' Forum has at its disposal the listed building ensemble of a former engine shed and signal box at Moorweg 2 in Jever, from which the association created a venue for cultural presentations of all kinds. The historical building ensemble offers rooms for the ZiL - ZiL – Zimmertheater im Lokschuppen as well as for the Galerie im Lokschuppen. The building also houses a collection of tea strainers from various eras and countries. The stage in the locomotive shed is an old goods truck from the Deutsche Bundesbahn. Since 2001, the in-house Jever ArtEnsemble has been performing plays and fairy tales in the ZiL. With around 80 events and changing exhibitions by renowned artists, the artists' forum is one of the focal points of Jever's cultural scene.

=== Sports ===
MTV Jever von 1862 e. V. is the largest club in the town of Jever, with over 2,100 members in thirteen departments. The association, which was founded on 20 June 1862 by 53 people as a purely male gymnastics club, was founded according to the physical education principles of Friedrich Ludwig Jahn. It was not until 21 February 1896 that a "ladies' section" was founded with 34 women and girls. Today, the club provides a comprehensive range of sports and leisure activities for all age and population groups. With well over 600 young members, the association is particularly committed to the promotion of professional sports in youth. In addition, the club also pursues performance-oriented goals in some areas (e.g. table tennis and handball). MTV Jever's own development association supports competitive sports on MTV Jever both ideally and economically.

Furthermore, the football club FSV Jever e.V. is based in Marienstadt. It was founded in 1946 as FC Jever-Heidmühle—acquiring its current name in 1948—and since then has been the football club of the "Kiebitze", as the members of the club call themselves. Since 2013, the club's sponsoring association has made it possible to lay an artificial turf pitch on the club's premises in Jahnstrasse. As of 2020, 13 teams, 10 junior and 3 senior teams are listed.

=== Events ===
A cycle of traditional annual events begins on the Monday after Epiphany (6 January), with the so-called Püttbierfest. This festival, which is celebrated peripherally in the various well districts, goes back to a Jeverian well decree, which was issued by the Jever municipal authorities under Prince Friedrich August of Anhalt-Zerbst (1734-1793) on 9 October 1756. This decree stipulates that every public fountain in the town must be looked after by a specified community of residents, the so-called Püttacht. Although the original function of the Püttacht has been lost, the new Püttmeister is elected and the Püttbuch is continued according to the old custom during the Püttbierfest.

On the weekend of Palm Sunday, there is an annual spring festival, the Kiewittmarkt (Kiebitzmarkt). This three-day event features seasonal stalls, an open Sunday and live music in public places. The Kiewittmarkt is organised by Jever aktiv, the advertising association of Jever businessmen and by Jever Marketing und Tourismus GmbH.

The Altstadtfest, which has been held on weekends in the first half of August since 1974, presents the town's rich club life in addition to many stalls, events and live music. The event, which also attracts many foreign guests and former Jeverans, is held in the pedestrian zones, the historic church square and the Old Market Square.

The Brüllmarkt, which commemorates the special importance that Jever once had for the regional cattle trade, takes place in October. A Christmas market, which opens its doors in the week before the first Advent, brings the great annual festivities of Jever to a close.

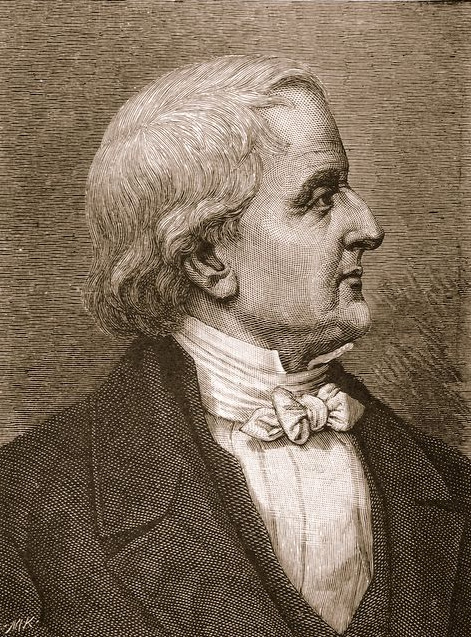
Friedrich Christoph Schlosser

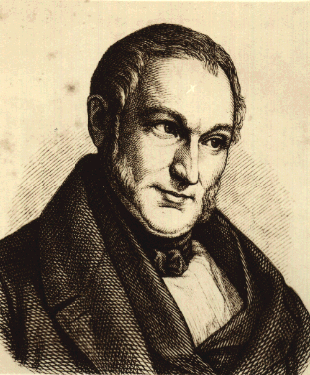
Johann Heinrich von Thünen

== Notable people ==
- Maria of Jever (1500-1575), the last ruler of the Lordship of Jever from 1517 on.
- Paul Heinrich Gerhard Möhring (1710–1792), physician, botanist and zoologist
- Friedrich Christoph Schlosser (1776-1861), historian, university professor and a Privy Councillor.
- Johann Heinrich von Thünen (1783–1850), agricultural economist, social reformer and model landlord.
- Eilhard Mitscherlich (1794–1863), born in Neuende, a major German chemist and mineralogist.
- Georg Müller-Jürgens (1883–1971), lawyer and mayor of Jever
- Karl Jaspers (1883–1969), psychiatrist and philosopher; regular visitor to paternal grandparents in Jever.
- Wiebke Eden (born 1968), author
- Anne Janssen (born 1982), politician

== Ten-mark banknote ==
In 1825 Carl Friedrich Gauss stayed temporarily in Jever, for surveying work. The 10 Deutsche Mark note in the Fourth Series ("BBk III"; 1948–1990) showed a sextant on the back, as well as a sketch of the triangulation of Wangerooge and Neuwerk, with Jever as the triangulation station.

== Economy and infrastructure ==
=== Traffic ===
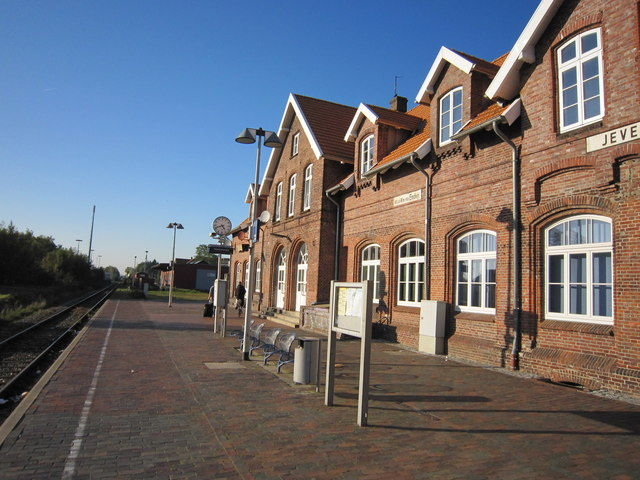
Jever train station

Jever is located on RB59 line (East Frisian coastal railway), which runs from Oldenburg via Sande, Jever, Wittmund and Burhafe to Esens. Also Jever is located on the former Jever-Harle railway, which nowadays is out of service.

Jever is located on the area if the transport association Verkehrsverbund Ems-Jade (VEJ), but it's fare only applies for bus rides.

The town is served by local busses as well.
