= Lordship of Jever =

Territory in the Holy Roman Empire

Lordship Jever Herrschaft Jever (German)
- 1359–1807
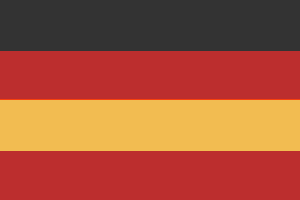
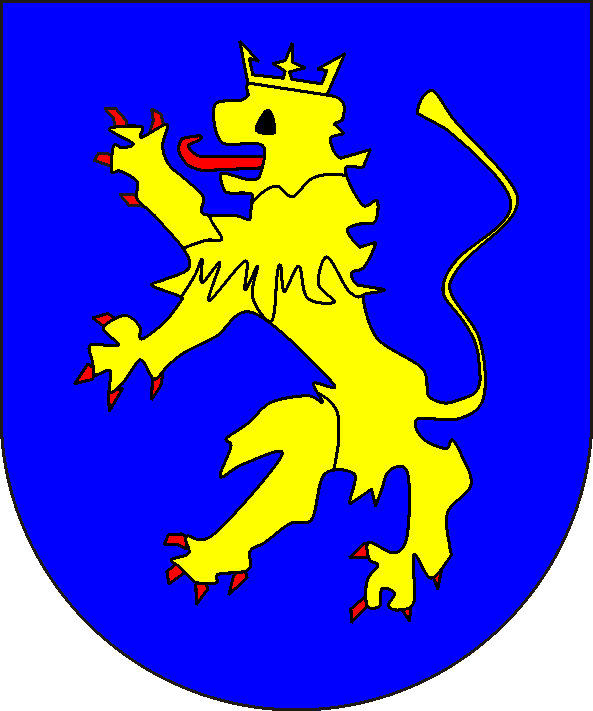
- (Proposed flag c.1800) Coat of arms

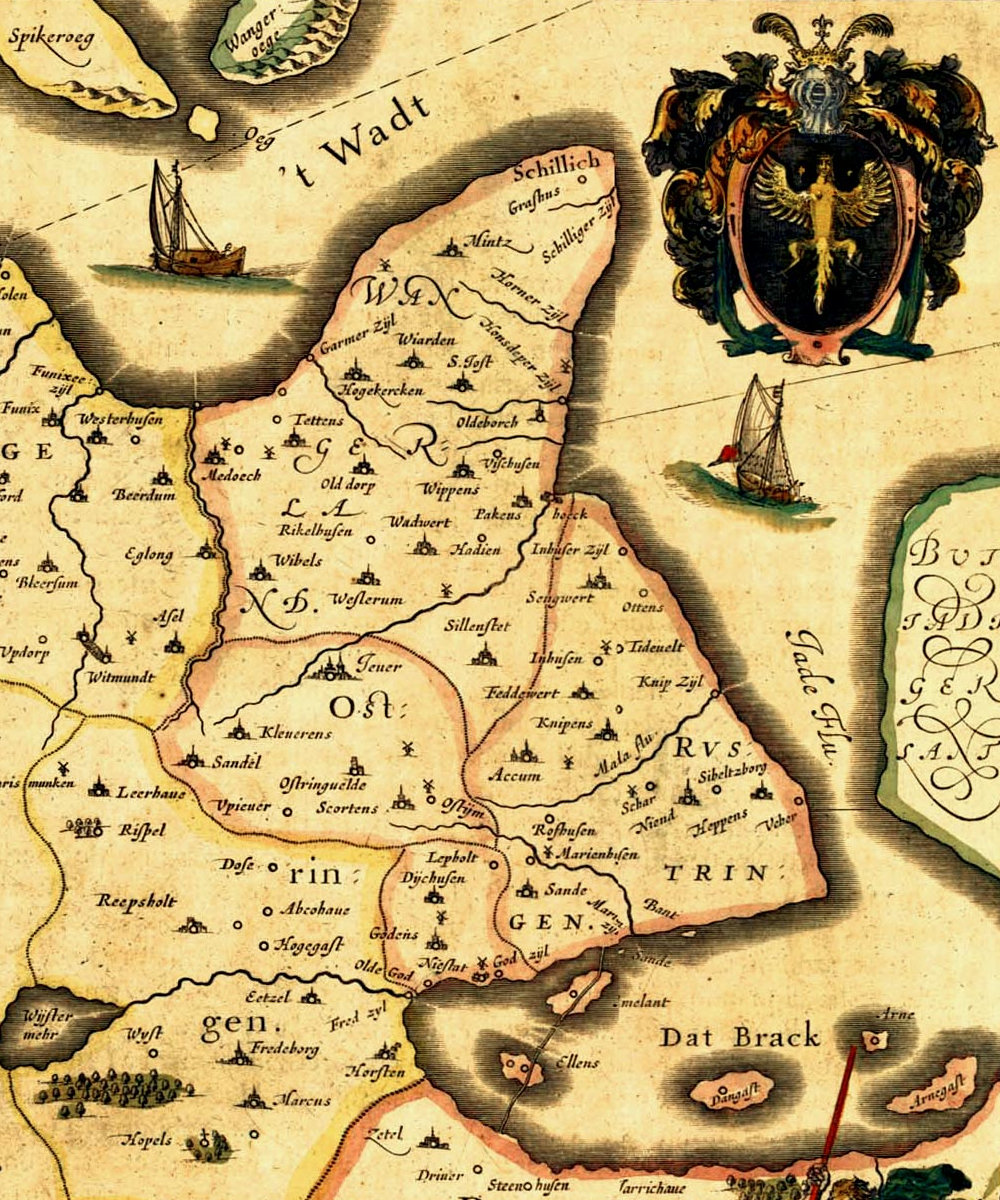
- Jeverland around 1600, by Ubbo Emmius
- Status: Lordship (state of the Holy Roman Empire)
- Capital: Jever
- Common languages: East Frisian language (until the 20th century); Low Saxon (from the 17th century); German
- Religion: Major: Catholicism (until the 16th century), Lutheranism (from the 16th century); Minor: Catholicism (from the 16th century), Judaism
- Government: Feudal monarchy
- Lords of Jever
  - 1359-1415: Edo Wiemken the Elder (first lord)
  - 1415-1433: Sibet Lubben
  - 1433-1441: Hayo Harlda
  - 1441-1468: Tanno Duren
  - 1468-1511: Edo Wiemken the Younger
  - 1511–1517: Christopher of Jever
  - 1517–1575: Maria of Jever (last lady)
- Historical era: Middle Ages; Early modern era
  - Edo Wiemken the Elder becomes the leader of Wangerland, Östringen and Rüstringen: 1359
  - Death of Maria of Jever: 20 February 1575
  - Annexed to the Kingdom of Holland: 1807
Preceded by	Succeeded by
East Frisian chieftains	Kingdom of Holland
- Today part of: Germany

The Lordship of Jever (German: Herrschaft Jever) was a historical state within the Holy Roman Empire located in what is now the district of Friesland in Lower Saxony, Germany.

The Lordship of Jever emerged in the late Middle Ages when Edo Wiemken the Elder, a chieftain of several Frisian districts, consolidated his power over the region. It officially became part of the Holy Roman Empire in 1548, joining the Burgundian Circle.

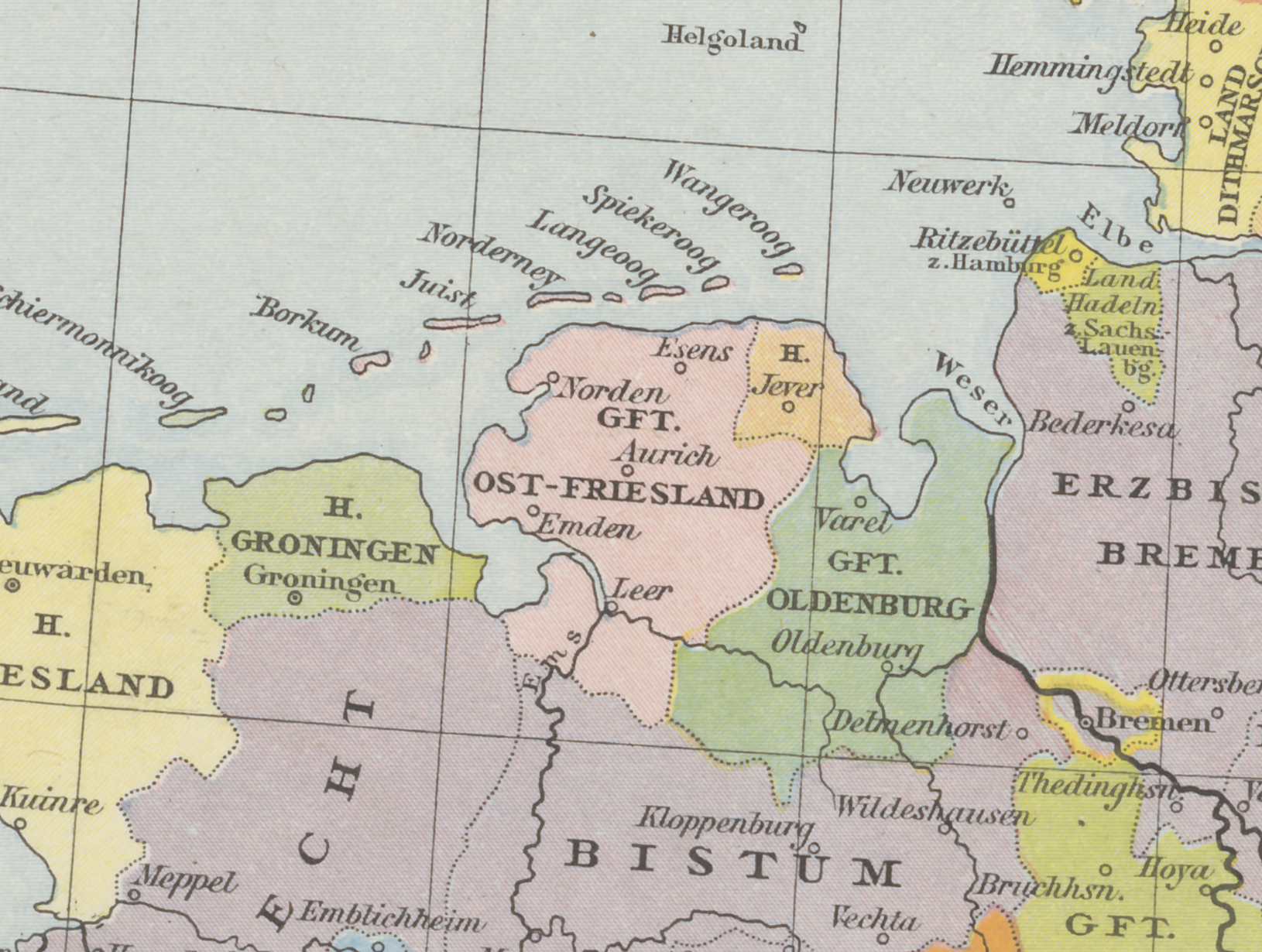
Jever on the map of East Frisia around 1500

Jever was ruled independently until 1575, when the last independent ruler, Maria of Jever, died without an heir. Maria had inherited the lordship in 1517 after her brother's death and was known for her efforts to maintain Jever's autonomy amidst pressures from neighboring County of East Frisia.

After Maria's death, Jever came under a personal union with the County of Oldenburg. However, it was not until 1667 that the lordship passed to the Principality of Anhalt-Zerbst, which held it until 1793. During this period, Jever was briefly occupied by East Frisia from 1517 to 1531 and saw the construction of the Jever Castle after the original was burned down in 1428.

Under Anhalt-Zerbst, Jever was involved in various conflicts, including providing soldiers for the American War of Independence. After the Anhalt-Zerbst line ended in 1793, Jever was inherited by Catherine the Great of Russia. However, during the Napoleonic Wars, Jever was reassigned to the Kingdom of Holland in 1807, and then to the French Ems-Oriental department in 1810.

The Lordship of Jever ceased to exist as a separate entity when it was fully annexed by Oldenburg in 1818. Today, the legacy of Jever can be seen in cultural and historical landmarks like Jever Castle, and it is remembered for its brief independence and the strong rule of Maria von Jever.
