= Sande, Lower Saxony =

Sande
- Municipality
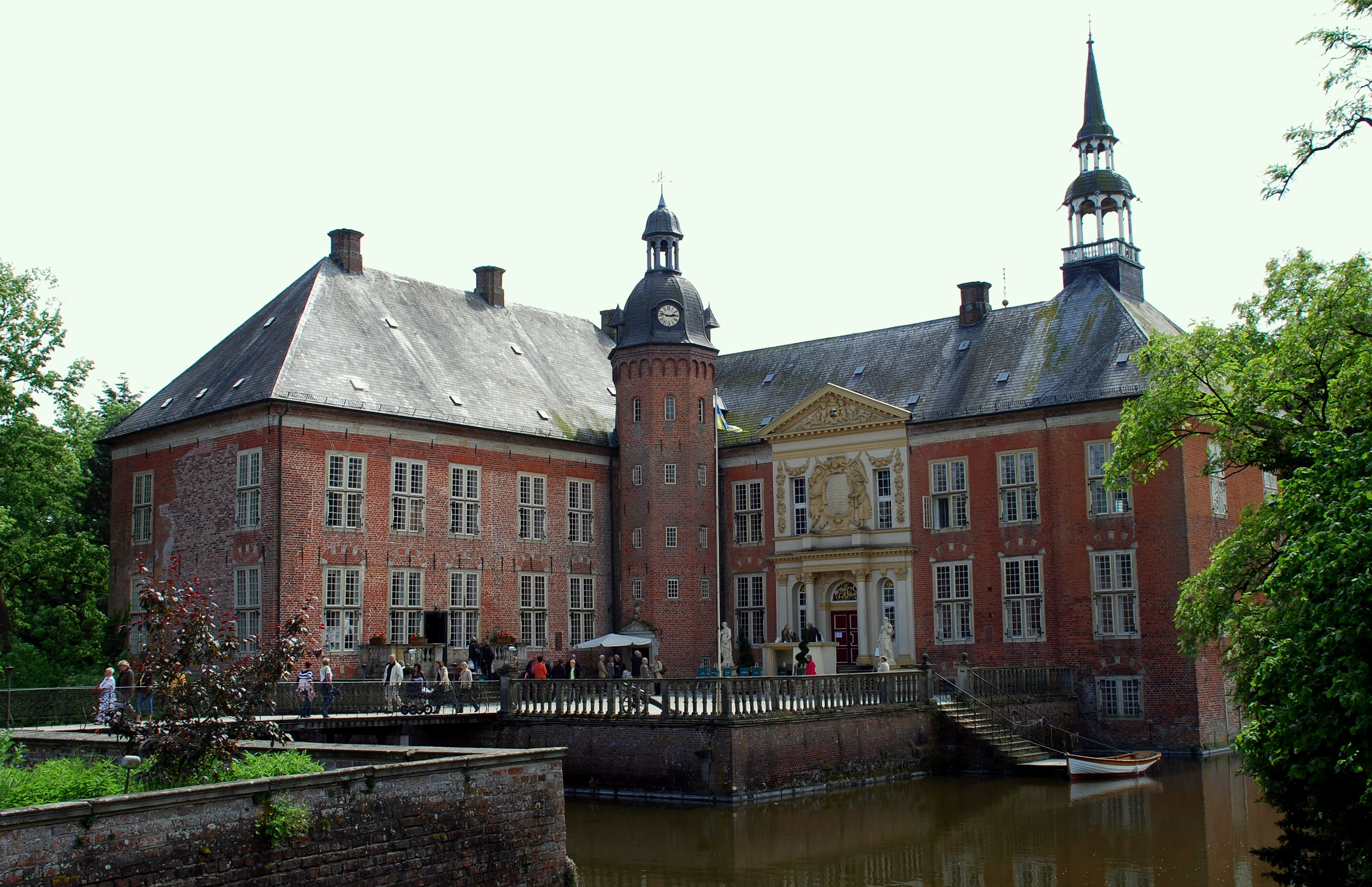
- Water castle

- Flag Coat of arms

- Location of Sande within Friesland district
- Interactive map of Sande
- Location within Germany Location within Lower Saxony
- Coordinates: 53°29′N 8°0′E
- Country: Germany
- State: Lower Saxony
- District: Friesland
- Subdivisions: 7 districts

Government
  - Mayor (2021–26): Stephan Eiklenborg

Area
  - Total: 44.92 km^{2} (17.34 sq mi)
- Elevation: 0 m (0 ft)

Population (2025-12-31)
  - Total: 8,629
  - Density: 192.1/km^{2} (497.5/sq mi)
- Time zone: UTC+01:00 (CET)
  - Summer (DST): UTC+02:00 (CEST)
- Postal codes: 26452
- Dialling codes: 0 44 22
- Vehicle registration: FRI
- Website: www.sande.de

Sande (German pronunciation: [ˈzandə]) is a municipality in the district of Friesland, Lower Saxony, Germany. It is situated near the Jade Bight, approximately 7 kilometres (4.3 mi) west of Wilhelmshaven, and 12 kilometres (7.5 mi) southeast of Jever.

Sande is on the railway which links Oldenburg to Wilhelmshaven and Esens. A bypass is planned so that rail traffic for the JadeWeserPort will not pass through the centre of Sande.

== Economy and infrastructure ==
=== Traffic ===
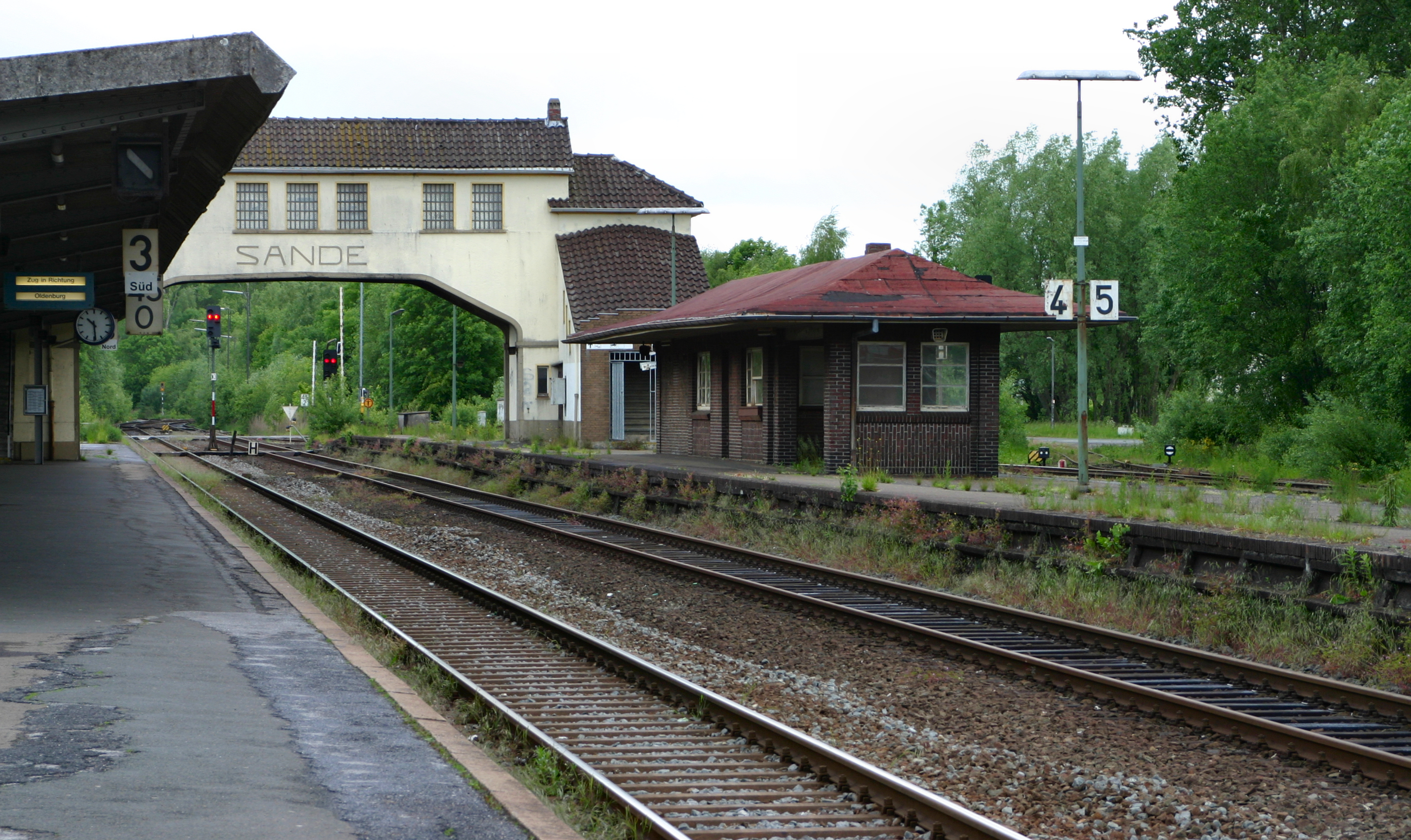
Sande station

Sande is located on RB59 line (East Frisian coastal railway), which runs from Oldenburg via Sande, Jever, Wittmund and Burhafe to Esens.

Sande is located on the area if the transport association Verkehrsverbund Ems-Jade (VEJ), but it's fare only applies for bus rides.

The town is served by local busses as well.

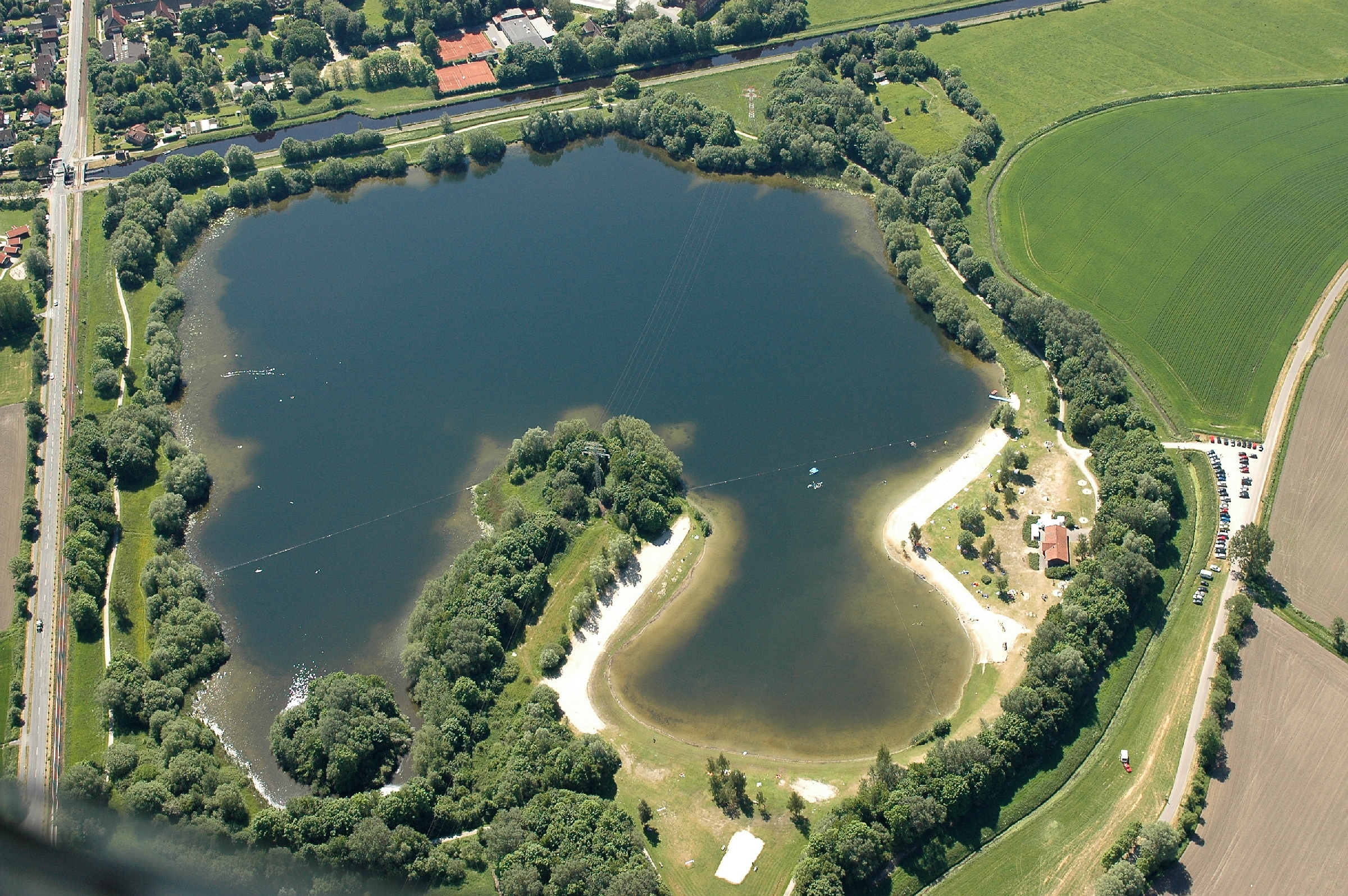
Sander Sea

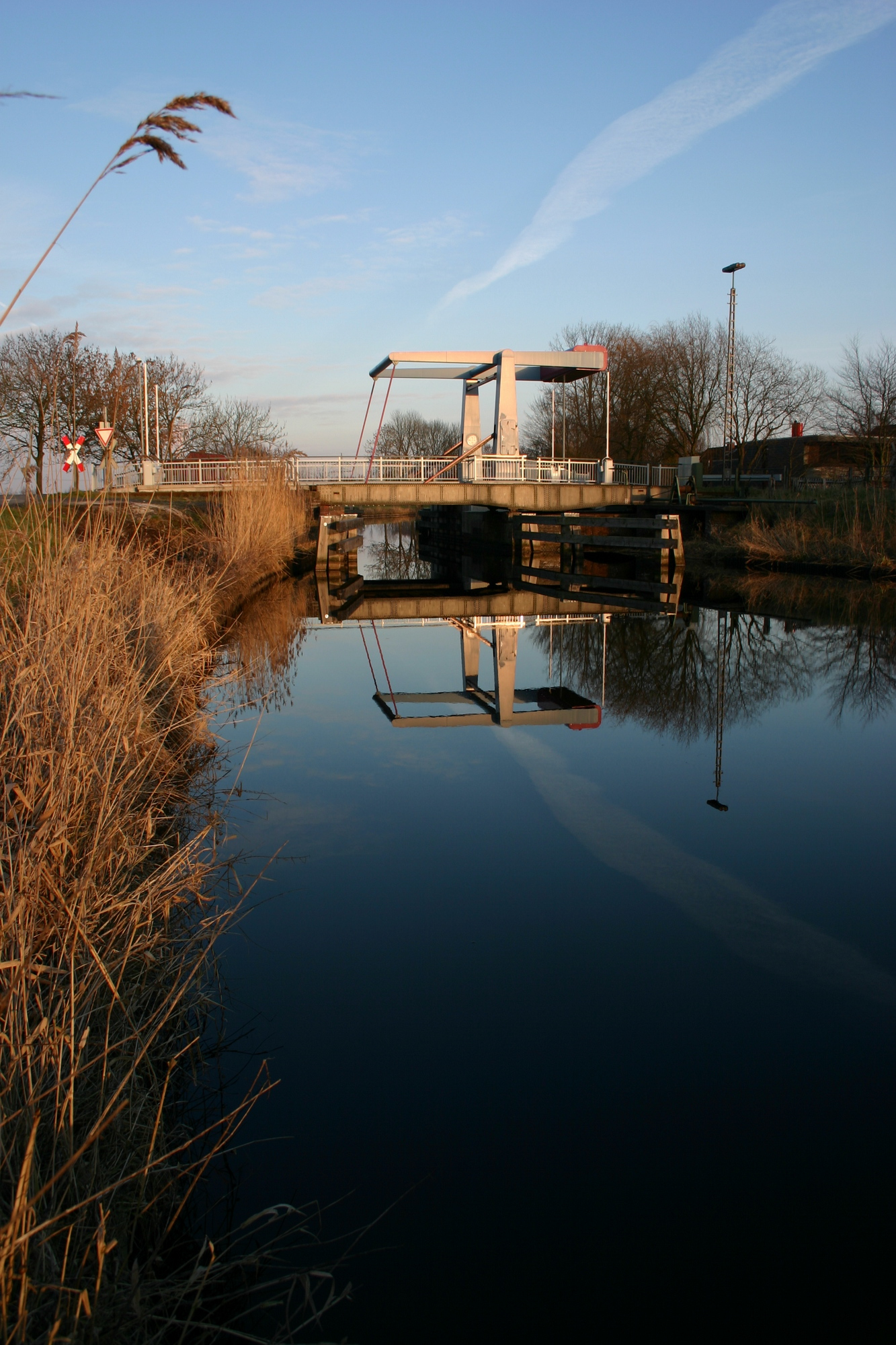
Ems-Jade Canal
