= Georg Müller-Jürgens =

German lawyer and mayor of Jever

Georg Müller-Jürgens (born Georg Müller; 4 May 1883 – 28 October 1971) was a German lawyer, mayor of Jever and member of the Oberkirchenrat (Upper Church Council).

== Life ==
Georg Müller was born in Dresden. He was the son of Georg Gottfried Müller, a secondary school teacher and headmaster, and Auguste Jürgens, who came from Jever. Since 1935 he was called Müller-Jürgens.

He studied law, received his doctorate in law and was mayor of the town of Jever from 1919 to 1935. In 1932 he joined the NSDAP. On 25 February 1935 he was elected full-time legal member of the Upper Church Council of the Evangelical Lutheran Church in Oldenburg and held this office until 9 June 1945, when he was dismissed at his own request with "pension-like alliance payments" due to his NSDAP membership.

He spent much of his life researching and publishing articles about the Vasa Sacra of the Oldenburger Land and of East Frisia.

== Works ==
- The Weser-Ems Area. Schulze, Oldenburg 1932
- (Ed.): The Weser-Ems region. The Northwest Mark of the German Reich. Schulze, Oldenburg 1933.
- People in the Weser-Ems Region. In: Race. Monatsschrift für den Nordischen Gedanken 9, 1942, Issue 1.
- Vasa sacra. Altarpiece in East Frisia (= Treatises and Lectures on the History of East Frisia 36). Publisher East Frisian Landscape, Aurich 1960
- Vasa sacra Oldenburgica. Volume 1. Holzberg, Oldenburg 1968.
