= Friesland (district) =

District in Lower Saxony, Germany

Coordinates: 53°30′N 8°00′E

- District
- Flag Coat of arms
- Country: Germany
- State: Lower Saxony
- Capital: Jever

Government
  - District admin.: Sven Ambrosy (SPD)

Area
  - Total: 608 km^{2} (235 sq mi)

Population (31 December 2022)
  - Total: 100,277
  - Density: 160/km^{2} (430/sq mi)
- Time zone: UTC+01:00 (CET)
  - Summer (DST): UTC+02:00 (CEST)
- Vehicle registration: FRI
- Website: friesland.de

Friesland is a district (Landkreis) in Lower Saxony, Germany. It is bounded by (from the southeast and clockwise) the districts of Wesermarsch, Ammerland, Leer and Wittmund, and by the North Sea. The city of Wilhelmshaven is enclosed by—but not part of—the district.

== History ==
The Frisian region was ruled by local chieftains until the 15th century; see East Frisia for details.

In 1438 in the northern part of today's Landkreis Friesland the Lordship of Jever was founded. East Frisia was from then on regarded as a hostile territory, and many skirmishes between Jever and East Frisia took place during the 15th and 16th centuries. The last ruler of Jever was Mary of Jever, who ruled until 1575.

After her death Jever became a part of Oldenburg, but East Frisia made a claim for the territory as well. In the following decades East Frisia tried to block all roads between Jever and Oldenburg. It was not before the 17th century that the hostilities between East Frisia and Oldenburg ended.

From 1667 to 1793 Jever was an exclave of Anhalt-Zerbst, and after Napoleonic occupation the westernmost exclave of Prussia. In 1818 Jever became a part of Oldenburg again.

The southern part of today's District of Friesland is the "Friesische Wehde" ("Frisian Woods"), which also was most of the time part of Oldenburg. This region later formed the District of Varel.

The District was established in 1933 by merging the former districts of Jever and Varel under the name of "Friesland". In 1977 it was dissolved and divided between the neighbouring districts of Wittmund and Ammerland. The dissolution was declared unconstitutional in 1979 because it violated the rights of the former State of Oldenburg, and the District was re-established in its old boundaries in 1980.

Friesland is also a province in the northwest of the Netherlands.

== Geography ==
In the east the district is bounded by the Jade Bight, a shallow bay of the North Sea. The island of Wangerooge, one of the East Frisian Islands, is a part of Friesland.

The inhabitants of Friesland insist that they are not a part of East Frisia. This is somewhat confusing, since Friesland is situated east of East Frisia, and geographers regard Friesland as a part of that region. The distinction has historical reasons: Friesland was an independent state from 1438 to 1575 (see above for details). Then and afterwards the region bore the name "Friesland", although this is also the German name for the entire Frisia.

Part of the District is in the Lower Saxony Wadden Sea National Park.

== Coat of arms ==
The lion is from the arms of the chieftains of Jever; it was the symbol of the Lordship of Jever. The blazon of the arms is: "Azure, a lion rampant Or, armed and langued Gules, and in chief two Greek crosses Argent".

== Cities and municipalities ==
Clickable map of towns and municipalities in the district

Cities
1. Jever
2. Schortens
3. Varel
Municipalities
1. Bockhorn
2. Sande
3. Wangerland
4. Wangerooge
5. Zetel
