= Testo =

Testo can refer to:

- Trade name for the drug Tiabendazole
- David Testo (b. 1981), American soccer player
- Testo (rapper) (b. 1988), German rapper
- In early oratorio, narrator
- Testo SE, German company that manufactures measuring equipment
- Colloquial abbreviation for testosterone
