= Wilhelm Kunst =

Wilhelm Kunst may refer to:

- Wilhelm Kunst (actor)
- Wilhelm Kunst (sculptor)
