= Felix von Eckardt =

German journalist and politician (1903–1979)

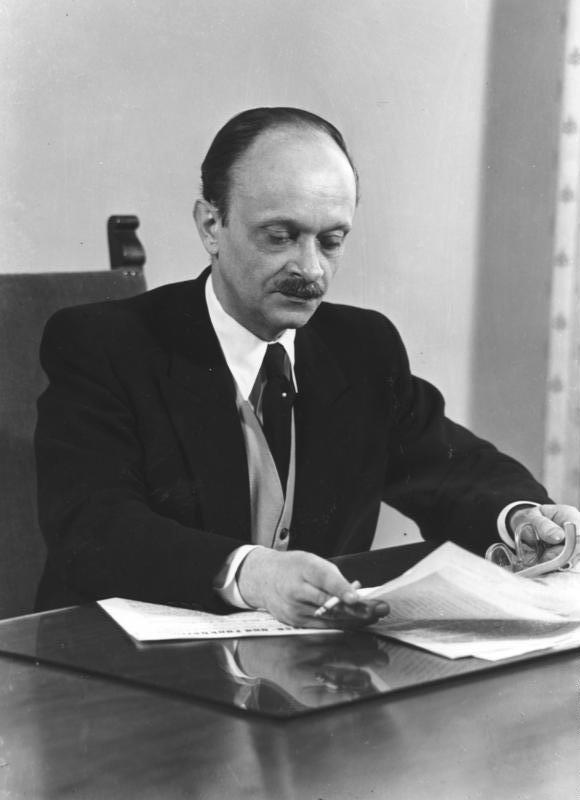
- von Eckardt in 1952

Member of the Bundestag; from Lower Saxony
- In office 19 October 1965 – 13 December 1972
- Preceded by: Johann Cramer
- Succeeded by: Multi-member district
- Constituency: Wilhelmshaven – Friesland (1965–1969); State list (1969–1972)

Personal details
- Born: Felix Heinrich Fedor von Eckardt; 18 June 1903 Berlin, Germany
- Died: 11 May 1979 (aged 75) Capri, Italy
- Party: Christian Democratic Union
- Spouse: Edith Peters (died)
- Children: 2
- Relatives: Friedrich Heinrich Geffcken (grandfather)
- Occupation: Journalist; Politician
- Awards: Order of Merit of the Federal Republic of Germany

Felix von Eckardt (18 June 1903 – 11 May 1979) was a journalist, Nazi propagandist, plenipotentiary of the West German government, and editor of Weser-Kurier. Before 1945 he wrote and co-wrote 19 Nazi propaganda films including Weisse Sklaven, Kopf hoch, Johannes!, and Menschen im Sturm, all of which were prohibited by Allied authorities after 1945. Shortly after the war he became editor of the West German newspaper Weser-Kurier.

In 1952 he became head of the Press and Information Agency of the Federal Government in West Germany. Following that, in 1956, he became the West German observer in the United Nations, in 1963 he returend to West Berlin to direct federal authorities in the border area. and in 1965 he was elected as a politician of the Christian Democratic Union in the Bundestag.

In 1962 he won the Federal Distinguished Service Cross with star and shoulder ribbon.

== Selected filmography ==
- The Optimist (1938)
