= Friesland – Wilhelmshaven – Wittmund =

Federal electoral district of Germany

26 Friesland – Wilhelmshaven – Wittmund
- Electoral district for the Bundestag
- Friesland – Wilhelmshaven – Wittmund in 2025
- State: Lower Saxony
- Population: 231,700 (2019)
- Electorate: 189,047 (2021)
- Major settlements: Wilhelmshaven; Wittmund
- Area: 1,373.5 km^{2}

Current electoral district
- Created: 1949
- Party: SPD
- Member: Siemtje Möller
- Elected: 2017, 2021, 2025

Friesland – Wilhelmshaven – Wittmund is an electoral constituency (German: Wahlkreis) represented in the Bundestag. It elects one member via first-past-the-post voting. Under the current constituency numbering system, it is designated as constituency 26. It is located in northwestern Lower Saxony, comprising the city of Wilhelmshaven and the districts of Friesland and Wittmund.

Friesland – Wilhelmshaven – Wittmund was created for the inaugural 1949 federal election. Since 2017, it has been represented by Siemtje Möller of the Social Democratic Party (SPD).

== Geography ==
Friesland – Wilhelmshaven – Wittmund is located in northwestern Lower Saxony. As of the 2021 federal election, it comprises the independent city of Wilhelmshaven and the entirety of the districts of Friesland and Wittmund.

== History ==
Unterems was created in 1949. In the 1949 election, it was Lower Saxony constituency 3. For the 1953 through 1961 elections, it was constituency 25 in the numbering system. From 1965 through 1998, it was constituency 21; from 2002 through 2009, it was constituency 27. Since the 2013 election, it has been constituency 26.

Originally, it comprised the city of Wilhelmshaven and the district of Friesland. At this time, it was named Wilhelmshaven – Friesland. In the 1965 election, the constituency gained the districts of Aurich and Wittmund, while losing the municipalities of Bockhorn, Neuenburg, Sande, Varel, Varel-Land, and Zetel, which were transferred to the Oldenburg constituency. Due to administrative reforms, in the 1976 election, it lost the municipality of Gödens.

In the 1980 election, the constituency was renamed to Friesland – Wilhelmshaven, and gained the municipality of Sande. The municipalities of Bockhorn, Varel, and Zetel also returned to the constituency in the 2002 election. In the 2013 election, it acquired its current name of Friesland – Wilhelmshaven – Wittmund.

Election	No.	Name	Borders
1949	3	Wilhelmshaven – Friesland	Wilhelmshaven city; Friesland district
1953	25	Wilhelmshaven – Friesland	Wilhelmshaven city; Friesland district
1957	25	Wilhelmshaven – Friesland	Wilhelmshaven city; Friesland district
1961	25	Wilhelmshaven – Friesland	Wilhelmshaven city; Friesland district
1965	21	Wilhelmshaven – Friesland	Wilhelmshaven city; Friesland district (excluding Bockhorn, Neuenburg, Sande, Varel, Varel-Land, and Zetel municipalities); Aurich district; Wittmund district
1969	21	Wilhelmshaven – Friesland	Wilhelmshaven city; Friesland district (excluding Bockhorn, Neuenburg, Sande, Varel, Varel-Land, and Zetel municipalities); Aurich district; Wittmund district
1972	21	Wilhelmshaven – Friesland	Wilhelmshaven city; Friesland district (excluding Bockhorn, Neuenburg, Sande, Varel, Varel-Land, and Zetel municipalities); Aurich district; Wittmund district
1976	21	Wilhelmshaven – Friesland	Wilhelmshaven city; Friesland district (excluding Bockhorn, Neuenburg, Sande, Varel, Varel-Land, and Zetel municipalities); Aurich district; Wittmund district
1980	21	Friesland – Wilhelmshaven	Wilhelmshaven city; Friesland district (excluding Bockhorn, Varel, and Zetel municipalities); Wittmund district
1983	21	Friesland – Wilhelmshaven	Wilhelmshaven city; Friesland district (excluding Bockhorn, Varel, and Zetel municipalities); Wittmund district
1987	21	Friesland – Wilhelmshaven	Wilhelmshaven city; Friesland district (excluding Bockhorn, Varel, and Zetel municipalities); Wittmund district
1990	21	Friesland – Wilhelmshaven	Wilhelmshaven city; Friesland district (excluding Bockhorn, Varel, and Zetel municipalities); Wittmund district
1994	21	Friesland – Wilhelmshaven	Wilhelmshaven city; Friesland district (excluding Bockhorn, Varel, and Zetel municipalities); Wittmund district
1998	21	Friesland – Wilhelmshaven	Wilhelmshaven city; Friesland district (excluding Bockhorn, Varel, and Zetel municipalities); Wittmund district
2002	27	Friesland – Wilhelmshaven	Wilhelmshaven city; Friesland district; Wittmund district
2005	27	Friesland – Wilhelmshaven	Wilhelmshaven city; Friesland district; Wittmund district
2009	27	Friesland – Wilhelmshaven	Wilhelmshaven city; Friesland district; Wittmund district
2013	26	Friesland – Wilhelmshaven – Wittmund	Wilhelmshaven city; Friesland district; Wittmund district
2017	26	Friesland – Wilhelmshaven – Wittmund	Wilhelmshaven city; Friesland district; Wittmund district
2021	26	Friesland – Wilhelmshaven – Wittmund	Wilhelmshaven city; Friesland district; Wittmund district
2025	26	Friesland – Wilhelmshaven – Wittmund	Wilhelmshaven city; Friesland district; Wittmund district

== Members ==
The constituency has been held by the Social Democratic Party (SPD) during all but three Bundestag terms since 1949; it has returned a representative from the SPD in every federal election since 1969. Its first representative was Johann Cramer of the SPD, who served a single term from 1949 to 1953. In 1953, the constituency was won by Hellmuth Heye of the Christian Democratic Union (CDU), who served until 1961. Cramer won the constituency back for the SPD in 1961, but Felix von Eckardt of the CDU won it in 1965. Cramer again won the constituency in 1969, and served a third term. He was succeeded by Herbert Ehrenberg in 1972, who served until 1990. Gabriele Iwersen served from 1990 to 2002, followed by Karin Evers-Meyer from 2002 to 2017. Siemtje Möller won the constituency in 2017.

Election	Member	Party	%
1949	Johann Cramer	SPD	32.6
1953	Hellmuth Heye	CDU	37.8
1957	Hellmuth Heye	CDU	43.2
1961	Johann Cramer	SPD	44.3
1965	Felix von Eckardt	CDU	44.5
1969	Johann Cramer	SPD	48.3
1972	Herbert Ehrenberg	SPD	57.2
1976	Herbert Ehrenberg	SPD	53.8
1980	Herbert Ehrenberg	SPD	54.6
1983	Herbert Ehrenberg	SPD	47.2
1987	Herbert Ehrenberg	SPD	48.1
1990	Gabriele Iwersen	SPD	43.6
1994	Gabriele Iwersen	SPD	47.9
1998	Gabriele Iwersen	SPD	53.3
2002	Karin Evers-Meyer	SPD	54.8
2005	Karin Evers-Meyer	SPD	50.4
2009	Karin Evers-Meyer	SPD	39.9
2013	Karin Evers-Meyer	SPD	44.1
2017	Siemtje Möller	SPD	39.7
2021	Siemtje Möller	SPD	45.4
2025	Siemtje Möller	SPD	35.4

== Election results ==
=== 2025 election ===
Federal election (2025): Friesland – Wilhelmshaven – Wittmund
Notes:	Blue background denotes the winner of the electorate vote. Pink background denotes a candidate elected from their party list. Yellow background denotes an electorate win by a list member, or other incumbent. A ✓ or ✗ denotes status of any incumbent, win or lose respectively.						
Party	Candidate	Votes	%	±%	Party votes	%	±%
SPD	✓ Siemtje Möller	52,913	35.4	▼10.1	38,211	25.5	▼12.5
CDU	Anne Janssen	40,089	26.8	▲4.8	39,618	26.4	▲5.0
AfD	Martin Sichert	29,525	19.7	▲12.0	30,278	20.2	▲12.0
Greens	Ulrike Maus	8,630	5.8	▼4.4	12,572	8.4	▼4.4
Left	Vincent Janßen	8,246	5.5	▲2.9	10,896	7.3	▲4.2
BSW					6,121	4.1	
FDP	Robert Wegener	3,974	2.7	▼4.5	5,961	4.0	▼6.5
FW	Andreas Lang	2,534	1.7	▼0.3	1,232	0.8	▼0.3
Tierschutzpartei					2.283	1.5	▼0.1
PARTEI	Anja Sanchez Mengeler	1,508	1.0	▼1.0	827	0.6	▼0.6
dieBasis	Stephanie Langner	1,189	0.8	▼0.2	550	0.4	▼0.5
Volt	Merten Köhler	1,021	0.7		756	0.5	▲0.3
Pirates					235	0.2	▼0.2
BD					199	0.1	
Humanists					114	0.1	0.0
MLPD					51	0.0	0.0
Informal votes		1,152			877		
Total valid votes		149,629			149,904		
Turnout		150,781	81.1	▲10.2			
SPD hold	Majority	12,824	8.6	▼14.8			

=== 2021 election ===
Federal election (2021): Friesland – Wilhelmshaven – Wittmund
Notes:	Blue background denotes the winner of the electorate vote. Pink background denotes a candidate elected from their party list. Yellow background denotes an electorate win by a list member, or other incumbent. A ✓ or ✗ denotes status of any incumbent, win or lose respectively.						
Party	Candidate	Votes	%	±%	Party votes	%	±%
SPD	✓ Siemtje Möller	60,392	45.4	▲5.7	50,448	38.0	▲7.3
CDU	Anne Janssen	29,286	22.0	▼10.4	28,535	21.5	▼11.3
Greens	Sina Beckmann	13,504	10.2	▲4.7	17,020	12.8	▲5.5
AfD	Joachim Wundrak	10,227	7.7	▼0.6	10,951	8.2	▼0.8
FDP	Hendrik Theemann	9,502	7.1	▲1.3	13,874	10.4	▲1.0
Left	Hans-Henning Adler	3,460	2.6	▼3.3	4,122	3.1	▼4.0
Tierschutzpartei					2,201	1.7	▲0.6
PARTEI	Andreas Tönjes	2,651	2.0	▲0.7	1,539	1.2	▲0.3
FW	Andreas Lang	2,611	2.0	▲1.1	1,512	1.1	▲0.5
dieBasis	Andrea Henning	1,275	1.0		1,155	0.9	
Pirates					419	0.3	0.0
Team Todenhöfer					298	0.2	
Volt					266	0.2	
NPD					125	0.1	▼0.2
Humanists					115	0.1	
V-Partei3					92	0.1	0.0
du.					91	0.1	
ÖDP					62	0.0	0.0
MLPD	Carsten Zimmer	68	0.1	▼0.1	50	0.0	0.0
LKR					34	0.0	
DKP					21	0.0	0.0
Informal votes		1,188			1,234		
Total valid votes		132,976			132,930		
Turnout		134,164	71.0	▼2.5			
SPD hold	Majority	31,106	23.4	▲16.1			

=== 2017 election ===
Federal election (2017): Friesland – Wilhelmshaven – Wittmund
Notes:	Blue background denotes the winner of the electorate vote. Pink background denotes a candidate elected from their party list. Yellow background denotes an electorate win by a list member, or other incumbent. A ✓ or ✗ denotes status of any incumbent, win or lose respectively.						
Party	Candidate	Votes	%	±%	Party votes	%	±%
SPD	Siemtje Möller	54,504	39.7	▼4.5	42,207	30.7	▼5.6
CDU	Hans-Werner Kammer	44,537	32.4	▼7.2	45,098	32.8	▼5.6
AfD	Achim Postert	11,392	8.3		12,490	9.1	▲4.9
Left	Holger Onken	8,127	5.9	▲0.8	9,738	7.1	▲1.9
FDP	Hendrik Theemann	8,074	5.9	▲3.6	12,958	9.4	▲5.1
Greens	Victor Alexander von Fintel	7,542	5.5	▼0.1	9,984	6.3	▲0.1
PARTEI	Andreas Tönjes	1,749	1.3		1,216	0.9	
Tierschutzpartei					1,423	1.0	▲0.1
FW	Udo Striess-Grubert	1,236	0.9	▼1.0	880	0.6	▼0.2
NPD					389	0.3	▼0.6
Pirates					377	0.3	▼1.2
MLPD	Conrad-Lüder von Petz	182	0.1		93	0.1	0.0
DM					177	0.1	
BGE					175	0.1	
V-Partei³					150	0.1	
DiB					121	0.1	
ÖDP					90	0.1	
DKP					30	0.0	
Informal votes		1,810			1,557		
Total valid votes		137,343			137,596		
Turnout		139,153	73.5	▲2.9			
SPD hold	Majority	9,967	7.3	▲2.9			

=== 2013 election ===
Federal election (2013): Friesland – Wilhelmshaven – Wittmund
Notes:	Blue background denotes the winner of the electorate vote. Pink background denotes a candidate elected from their party list. Yellow background denotes an electorate win by a list member, or other incumbent. A ✓ or ✗ denotes status of any incumbent, win or lose respectively.						
Party	Candidate	Votes	%	±%	Party votes	%	±%
SPD	✓ Karin Evers-Meyer	58,178	44.1	▲4.3	48,011	36.3	▲5.2
CDU	Hans-Werner Kammer	52,275	39.7	▲7.2	50,796	38.4	▲8.8
Greens	V. Alexander von Fintel	7,362	5.6	▼1.9	9,731	7.3	▼1.8
Left	Ralph T. Niemeyer	6,736	5.1	▼4.2	6,814	5.1	▼5.2
FDP	Lübbo Meppen	3,024	2.3	▼7.1	5,670	4.3	▼10.4
AfD					5,479	4.1	
FW	Udo Striess-Grubert	2,538	1.9		1,106	0.8	
Pirates					2,007	1.5	▼0.4
NPD	Sebastian Weist	1,680	1.3	▼0.2	1,206	0.9	▼0.3
Tierschutzpartei					1,194	0.9	▼0.1
PRO					149	0.1	
REP					87	0.1	
PBC					82	0.1	
MLPD					70	0.1	0.0
Informal votes		2,369			1,760		
Total valid votes		131,793			132,402		
Turnout		134,162	70.6	▲0.9			
SPD hold	Majority	5,903	4.4	▼3.1			

=== 2009 election ===
Federal election (2009): Friesland – Wilhelmshaven
Notes:	Blue background denotes the winner of the electorate vote. Pink background denotes a candidate elected from their party list. Yellow background denotes an electorate win by a list member, or other incumbent. A ✓ or ✗ denotes status of any incumbent, win or lose respectively.						
Party	Candidate	Votes	%	±%	Party votes	%	±%
SPD	✓ Karin Evers-Meyer	51,851	39.9	▼10.6	40,610	31.0	▼15.6
CDU	Hans-Werner Kammer	42,211	32.4	▼1.3	38,728	29.6	▼0.9
FDP	Lübbo Meppen	12,283	9.4	▲4.4	19,204	14.7	▲5.8
Left	Anja Kindo	12,055	9.3	▲5.1	13,572	10.4	▲5.5
Greens	Peter Sokolowski	9,794	7.5	▲3.7	12,009	9.2	▲3.3
Pirates					2,452	1.9	
NPD	Werner Klawun	1,911	1.5	▼0.2	1,570	1.2	▼0.3
Tierschutzpartei					1,277	1.0	▲0.2
RRP					1,071	0.8	
ÖDP					112	0.1	
DVU					106	0.1	
MLPD					85	0.1	0.0
Informal votes		2,630			1,939		
Total valid votes		130,105			130,796		
Turnout		132,735	69.7	▼7.1			
SPD hold	Majority	9,640	7.4	▼9.2			

=== 2005 election ===
Federal election (2005):Friesland - Wilhelmshaven
Notes:	Blue background denotes the winner of the electorate vote. Pink background denotes a candidate elected from their party list. Yellow background denotes an electorate win by a list member, or other incumbent. A ✓ or ✗ denotes status of any incumbent, win or lose respectively.						
Party	Candidate	Votes	%	±%	Party votes	%	±%
SPD	✓ Karin Evers-Meyer	72,454	50.4	▼4.4	67,133	46.6	▼5.4
CDU	Hans-Werner Kammer	48,472	33.7	▲1.6	43,900	30.5	▼0.2
FDP	Lutz Bauermeister	7,187	5.0	▼2.1	12,846	8.9	▲0.7
Left	Dirk Metzner	6,004	4.2	▲2.8	6,962	4.8	▲3.8
Greens	Christiane Lux-Hartig	5,480	3.8	▼0.3	8,409	5.8	▲0.1
NPD	Peter Müller	2,413	1.7		2,146	1.5	▲1.3
Tierschutzpartei					1,052	0.7	▲0.3
GRAUEN					977	0.7	▲0.5
Independent	Claus Westerman	917	0.6				
Independent	Günter Völker	706	0.5				
MLPD					163	0.1	
PBC					160	0.1	0.0
Pro German Center – Pro D-Mark Initiative					142	0.1	
BüSo					92	0.1	0.0
Informal votes		2,938			2,589		
Total valid votes		143,633			143,982		
Turnout		146,571	76.8	▼1.6			
SPD hold	Majority	23,982	16.7				
