= Seeheimer Kreis =

Group in Germany's Social Democratic Party

- Foundation: 1974; 52 years ago
- National affiliation: SPD
- Spokesperson: Marja-Liisa Völlers; Claudia Moll; Esra Limbacher
- Ideology: Economic liberalism
- Political position: Centre
- Website: seeheimer-kreis.de

The Seeheimer Kreis (German: [ˈzeːˌhaɪ̯.mɐ kʁaɪ̯s], lit. 'Seeheim Circle') is an official internal grouping within the Social Democratic Party of Germany (SPD) and one of the three main political factions within the SPD parliamentary group in the Bundestag, alongside the Parlamentarische Linke (PL) and Netzwerk Berlin. With around 94 members, it is the largest organized faction within the parliamentary group.

The group describes itself as “undogmatic and pragmatic” and generally advocates a moderately liberal economic and market-oriented approach. In public and media discussions, it is often described as the more conservative faction of the SPD parliamentary group. The Seeheimers emphasize policies that they consider economically feasible and place particular importance on employment, industrial policy, economic competitiveness, and the financial sustainability of the welfare state.

As of 2022, the group's spokespeople are Marja-Liisa Völlers, Dirk Wiese, and Uwe Schmidt. The Circle is named after its long-standing meeting place, Seeheim (Bergstraße), just south of Frankfurt.

== History ==
The origins of the Seeheimer Kreis can be traced back to the 1950s, when a group of more traditional and conservative members of the SPD began meeting informally under the name Kanalarbeiter (“Canal Workers”). Among their most prominent figures were Egon Franke and Annemarie Renger. The group represented a pragmatic, traditional strand of social democracy and became an influential force within the SPD parliamentary group. In 1969, Günther Metzger established the so-called Metzger Kreis, which developed in 1972 into the Arbeitskreis Linke Mitte (“Left Centre Working Group”). These groups, together with the Kanalarbeiter and other pragmatic currents, formed the political background from which the Seeheimer Kreis emerged.

The official founding of the Seeheimer Kreis is generally dated to a meeting at the Dorint Hotel in Lahnstein in December 1974. A year earlier, however, around 40 Social Democrats had already met at the initiative of Hans-Jochen Vogel to discuss how the moderate wing of the party could respond to the growing ideological influence of the left-wing members. Among those associated with the founding of the group were Hans Apel, Herbert Ehrenberg, Antje Huber, Richard Löwenthal, Annemarie Renger, and Gesine Schwan. Initially known as the Lahnsteiner Kreis, the group adopted the name Seeheimer Kreis after its meetings from 1978 onward at the Lufthansa training centre in Seeheim on the Bergstraße in southern Hesse. The name has remained in use ever since.

=== The Seeheimers and Helmut Schmidt ===
The Seeheimer Kreis became particularly influential during the chancellorship of Helmut Schmidt (1974–1982). Several Seeheimers served in Schmidt’s cabinets and provided him with important support during major internal debates within the SPD, particularly over nuclear energy and the NATO Double-Track Decision. The group also maintained a strong commitment to German reunification, distinguishing it from parts of the SPD left that were more sceptical about the political implications of reunification.

=== Agenda 2010 ===
During the 1990s, the Seeheimer Kreis increasingly focused on making the SPD capable of returning to government and developing a modernized social-democratic programme. This culminated in the group's strong support for the reform agenda of Gerhard Schröder, who became Chancellor in 1998. When Schröder introduced Agenda 2010 in March 2003, he called for extensive structural reforms aimed at improving economic growth, employment, and the long-term sustainability of the welfare state. The programme included reforms to unemployment benefits and the labour market that later became closely associated with the Hartz reforms.

The reforms were highly controversial within the SPD. The party's left wing argued that Agenda 2010 weakened the social safety net, while the Seeheimer Kreis strongly supported Schröder's reform programme and generally defended its market-oriented approach. The Seeheimers therefore became one of the most important internal SPD forces supporting the transformation of the party towards a more pragmatic, reform-oriented and economically liberal form of social democracy.

== Personnel ==
The Seeheim Circle is led by Siemtje Möller, Dirk Wiese, and Dagmar Ziegler. Other leading members of the Seeheimer are Doris Barnett, Fritz-Rudolf Körper, Edgar Franke, Sport Committee Chairwoman Dagmar Freitag, Carsten Schneider, who belong to a group known as the Sprecherkreis. Members of the advisory board for the Seeheimer include Sigmar Gabriel and Ulla Schmidt. Previous members have included Rolf Schwanitz, Thomas Oppermann and Wolfgang Tiefensee.

== Ideology ==
The Seeheim Circle focuses on pragmatic solutions in social policy, financial policy, and economic policy. The faction strives to align social welfare with financial possibilities, a commitment to give and take in social welfare, a reduction of the national debt, the necessity of reforms through pragmatic handling, and an open minded relationship to globalisation. The faction wants to pursue a more ambitious industrial policy. It is calling for lower electricity costs for businesses and a European single market that would only export and import goods produced in a net-zero manner.
