= Homburg (electoral district) =

Federal electoral district of Germany

299 Homburg
- Electoral district for the Bundestag
- Homburg in 2025
- State: Saarland
- Population: 240,500 (2019)
- Electorate: 185,941 (2021)
- Major settlements: Neunkirchen; Homburg; Sankt Ingbert
- Area: 550.2 km^{2}

Current electoral district
- Created: 1957
- Party: SPD
- Member: Esra Limbacher
- Elected: 2021, 2025

Homburg is an electoral constituency (German: Wahlkreis) represented in the Bundestag. It elects one member via first-past-the-post voting. Under the current constituency numbering system, it is designated as constituency 299. It is located in southeastern Saarland, comprising the Saarpfalz-Kreis district and parts of the Neunkirchen and Saarbrücken districts.

Homburg was created for the inaugural 1957 federal election after the accession of Saarland to Germany. Since 2021, it has been represented by Esra Limbacher of the Social Democratic Party of Germany (SPD).

== Geography ==
Homburg is located in southeastern Saarland. As of the 2021 federal election, it comprises the Saarpfalz-Kreis district, the municipalities of Neunkirchen and Spiesen-Elversberg from the Neunkirchen district, and the municipalities of Friedrichsthal, Quierschied, and Sulzbach from the Saarbrücken district.

== History ==
Homburg was created in 1957, then known as Homburg – St. Ingbert. In the 1965 through 1972 elections, it was named St. Ingbert. It acquired its current name in the 1976 election. In the 1957 and 1961 elections, it was constituency 247 in the numbering system. In the 1965 through 1998 elections, it was number 248. Since the 2002 election, it has been number 299.

Originally, the constituency comprised the Homburg district, the St. Ingbert district, and the municipality of Neunkirchen and Amt of Spiesen from Ottweiler district. In the 1976 through 1998 elections, it comprised the Saarpfalz-Kreis district and the municipalities of Neunkirchen and Spiesen-Elversberg from the Neunkirchen district. It acquired its current borders in the 2002 election.

Election	No.	Name	Borders
1957	247	Homburg – St. Ingbert	Homburg district; St. Ingbert district; Ottweiler district (only Neunkirchen municipality and Spiesen Amt)
1961	247	Homburg – St. Ingbert	Homburg district; St. Ingbert district; Ottweiler district (only Neunkirchen municipality and Spiesen Amt)
1965	248	St. Ingbert	Homburg district; St. Ingbert district; Ottweiler district (only Neunkirchen municipality and Spiesen Amt)
1969	248	St. Ingbert	Homburg district; St. Ingbert district; Ottweiler district (only Neunkirchen municipality and Spiesen Amt)
1972	248	St. Ingbert	Homburg district; St. Ingbert district; Ottweiler district (only Neunkirchen municipality and Spiesen Amt)
1976	248	Homburg	Saarpfalz-Kreis district; Neunkirchen district (only Neunkirchen and Spiesen-Elversberg municipalities)
1980	248	Homburg	Saarpfalz-Kreis district; Neunkirchen district (only Neunkirchen and Spiesen-Elversberg municipalities)
1983	248	Homburg	Saarpfalz-Kreis district; Neunkirchen district (only Neunkirchen and Spiesen-Elversberg municipalities)
1987	248	Homburg	Saarpfalz-Kreis district; Neunkirchen district (only Neunkirchen and Spiesen-Elversberg municipalities)
1990	248	Homburg	Saarpfalz-Kreis district; Neunkirchen district (only Neunkirchen and Spiesen-Elversberg municipalities)
1994	248	Homburg	Saarpfalz-Kreis district; Neunkirchen district (only Neunkirchen and Spiesen-Elversberg municipalities)
1998	248	Homburg	Saarpfalz-Kreis district; Neunkirchen district (only Neunkirchen and Spiesen-Elversberg municipalities)
2002	299	Homburg	Saarpfalz-Kreis district; Neunkirchen district (only Neunkirchen and Spiesen-Elversberg municipalities); Saarbrücken district (only Friedrichsthal, Quierschied, and Sulzbach municipalities)
2005	299	Homburg	Saarpfalz-Kreis district; Neunkirchen district (only Neunkirchen and Spiesen-Elversberg municipalities); Saarbrücken district (only Friedrichsthal, Quierschied, and Sulzbach municipalities)
2009	299	Homburg	Saarpfalz-Kreis district; Neunkirchen district (only Neunkirchen and Spiesen-Elversberg municipalities); Saarbrücken district (only Friedrichsthal, Quierschied, and Sulzbach municipalities)
2013	299	Homburg	Saarpfalz-Kreis district; Neunkirchen district (only Neunkirchen and Spiesen-Elversberg municipalities); Saarbrücken district (only Friedrichsthal, Quierschied, and Sulzbach municipalities)
2017	299	Homburg	Saarpfalz-Kreis district; Neunkirchen district (only Neunkirchen and Spiesen-Elversberg municipalities); Saarbrücken district (only Friedrichsthal, Quierschied, and Sulzbach municipalities)
2021	299	Homburg	Saarpfalz-Kreis district; Neunkirchen district (only Neunkirchen and Spiesen-Elversberg municipalities); Saarbrücken district (only Friedrichsthal, Quierschied, and Sulzbach municipalities)
2025	299	Homburg	Saarpfalz-Kreis district; Neunkirchen district (only Neunkirchen and Spiesen-Elversberg municipalities); Saarbrücken district (only Friedrichsthal, Quierschied, and Sulzbach municipalities)

== Members ==
The constituency was first represented by Kurt Conrad of the Social Democratic Party (SPD) from 1957 to 1961. It was won by Johann Klein of the Christian Democratic Union (CDU) in 1961. Werner Wilhelm regained it for the SPD in 1969 and served until 1980. He was succeeded by fellow SPD member Lothar Fischer from 1980 to 2002. Astrid Klug of the SPD was representative from 2002 to 2009. Alexander Funk of the CDU was elected in 2009 and served until 2017. He was succeeded by party fellow Markus Uhl in 2017. Esra Limbacher won the constituency for the SPD in 2021.

Election	Member	Party	%
1957	Kurt Conrad	SPD	31.6
1961	Johann Klein	CDU	46.3
1965	Johann Klein	CDU	44.5
1969	Werner Wilhelm	SPD	44.3
1972	Werner Wilhelm	SPD	52.4
1976	Werner Wilhelm	SPD	49.1
1980	Lothar Fischer	SPD	51.7
1983	Lothar Fischer	SPD	47.9
1987	Lothar Fischer	SPD	47.4
1990	Lothar Fischer	SPD	52.4
1994	Lothar Fischer	SPD	50.6
1998	Lothar Fischer	SPD	54.7
2002	Astrid Klug	SPD	50.4
2005	Astrid Klug	SPD	40.1
2009	Alexander Funk	CDU	33.4
2013	Alexander Funk	CDU	39.8
2017	Markus Uhl	CDU	33.6
2021	Esra Limbacher	SPD	36.6
2025	Esra Limbacher	SPD	30.5

== Election results ==
=== 2025 election ===
Federal election (2025): Homburg
Notes:	Blue background denotes the winner of the electorate vote. Pink background denotes a candidate elected from their party list. Yellow background denotes an electorate win by a list member, or other incumbent. A ✓ or ✗ denotes status of any incumbent, win or lose respectively.						
Party	Candidate	Votes	%	±%	Party votes	%	±%
SPD	✓ Esra Limbacher	44,560	30.5	▼6.1	32,333	22.0	▼15.2
CDU	Markus Uhl	40,910	28.0	▲1.9	38,206	26.1	▲3.2
AfD	Olexij Shvydkyi	34,096	23.4	▲11.7	34,800	23.7	▲12.2
Left	Moses Arndt	9,695	6.6	▲1.4	9,813	6.7	▲0.1
Greens	Carolin de Marino	6,479	4.4	▼0.5	9,652	6.6	New
BSW					8,459	5.8	New
FDP	Klaus Kieser	4,685	3.2	▼4.7	6,222	4.2	▼7.0
Tierschutzpartei					3,024	2.1	▼0.8
FW	Axel Kammerer	5,591	3.8	▲0.7	2,504	1.7	▼0.7
Volt					809	0.6	▼0.1
Pirates					410	0.3	▼0.3
BD					363	0.2	New
MLPD					68	<0.1	0.0
Informal votes		1,987			1,340		
Total valid votes		146,016			146,663		
Turnout		148,003	82.0	▲5.5			
SPD hold	Majority	3,650	2.5	▼8.0			

=== 2021 election ===
Federal election (2021): Homburg
Notes:	Blue background denotes the winner of the electorate vote. Pink background denotes a candidate elected from their party list. Yellow background denotes an electorate win by a list member, or other incumbent. A ✓ or ✗ denotes status of any incumbent, win or lose respectively.						
Party	Candidate	Votes	%	±%	Party votes	%	±%
SPD	Esra Limbacher	51,091	36.6	▲5.2	52,091	37.2	▲9.6
CDU	✗ Markus Uhl (Note: Uhl entered the Bundestag on the CDU list after Peter Altmaier declined his mandate.)	36,472	26.1	▼7.4	32,004	22.9	▼8.2
AfD	Christian Wirth	16,210	11.6	▲0.6	16,068	11.5	▼0.2
FDP	Ralf Armbrüster	11,015	7.9	▲2.7	15,719	11.2	▲3.5
Left	Florian Spaniol	7,312	5.2	▼5.7	9,247	6.6	▼5.8
Green	Maria Luise Herber	6,826	4.9	▼0.1			
Tierschutzpartei					4,045	2.9	
FW	Axel Kammerer	4,418	3.2	▲1.9	3,359	2.4	▲1.5
PARTEI	Evelyne Görlinger	3,287	2.4	▲0.8	2,202	1.6	▲0.3
dieBasis	Ute Weisang	2,086	1.5		1,878	1.3	
Volt					847	0.6	
Pirates					809	0.6	▲0.1
ÖDP	Claus Jacob	895	0.6		645	0.5	
Team Todenhöfer					526	0.4	
NPD					362	0.3	▼0.3
MLPD					81	0.1	0.0
Informal votes		2,676			2,405		
Total valid votes		139,612			139,883		
Turnout		142,288	76.5	▲0.6			
SPD gain from CDU	Majority	14,619	10.5				

=== 2017 election ===
Federal election (2017): Homburg
Notes:	Blue background denotes the winner of the electorate vote. Pink background denotes a candidate elected from their party list. Yellow background denotes an electorate win by a list member, or other incumbent. A ✓ or ✗ denotes status of any incumbent, win or lose respectively.						
Party	Candidate	Votes	%	±%	Party votes	%	±%
CDU	Markus Uhl	48,102	33.6	▼6.2	44,538	31.0	▼5.6
SPD	Esra Limbacher	45,022	31.4	▼6.2	39,729	27.7	▼4.2
AfD	Daniel Schütte	15,767	11.0	▲6.4	16,745	11.7	▲6.1
Left	Walter Kappmeier	15,724	11.0	▲1.9	17,773	12.4	▲2.2
FDP	Peter Habel	7,369	5.1	▲3.8	11,096	7.7	▲3.9
Greens	Marc Piazolo	7,128	5.0	▲1.4	8,109	5.6	▲0.5
PARTEI	Johannes Rösner	2,209	1.5		1,760	1.2	
FW	Axel Kammerer	1,783	1.2		1,273	0.9	▲0.2
NPD					779	0.5	▼1.2
Pirates					648	0.5	▼2.0
V-Partei³					382	0.3	
DM					253	0.2	
BGE					210	0.1	
PDV					121	0.1	
MLPD	Helmut Bohn-Klein	217	0.2		109	0.1	0.0
Informal votes		2,671			2,467		
Total valid votes		143,321			143,525		
Turnout		145,992	75.9	▲3.9			
CDU hold	Majority	3,080	2.2	0.0			

=== 2013 election ===
Federal election (2013): Homburg
Notes:	Blue background denotes the winner of the electorate vote. Pink background denotes a candidate elected from their party list. Yellow background denotes an electorate win by a list member, or other incumbent. A ✓ or ✗ denotes status of any incumbent, win or lose respectively.						
Party	Candidate	Votes	%	±%	Party votes	%	±%
CDU	✓ Alexander Funk	55,250	39.8	▲6.4	50,892	36.6	▲7.5
SPD	David Lindemann	52,266	37.6	▲6.7	44,365	31.9	▲6.5
Left	Yvonne Ploetz	12,592	9.1	▼10.3	14,180	10.2	▼11.5
AfD	Karsten Sturm	6,443	4.6		7,784	5.6	
Greens	Markus Schmitt	4,954	3.6	▼1.0	7,127	5.1	▼1.2
Pirates	Andreas Guckert	3,289	2.4		3,453	2.5	▲1.1
NPD	Niels Kandar	2,231	1.6	▲0.1	2,437	1.8	▲0.3
FDP	Thorsten Eich	1,890	1.4	▼5.9	5,266	3.8	▼8.0
FAMILIE					2,378	1.7	▼0.4
FW					930	0.7	
PRO					218	0.2	
MLPD					72	0.1	0.0
Informal votes		3,729			3,542		
Total valid votes		138,915			139,102		
Turnout		142,644	72.0	▼1.0			
CDU hold	Majority	2,984	2.2	▼0.3			

=== 2009 election ===
Federal election (2009): Homburg
Notes:	Blue background denotes the winner of the electorate vote. Pink background denotes a candidate elected from their party list. Yellow background denotes an electorate win by a list member, or other incumbent. A ✓ or ✗ denotes status of any incumbent, win or lose respectively.						
Party	Candidate	Votes	%	±%	Party votes	%	±%
CDU	Alexander Funk	48,092	33.4	▲0.7	42,033	29.1	▲0.3
SPD	✗ Astrid Klug (Note: Klug entered the Bundestag on the SPD list after the death of Ottmar Schreiner in April 2013.)	44,500	30.9	▼9.2	36,681	25.4	▼8.9
Left	Ralf Reinstädtler	27,933	19.4	▲4.0	31,382	21.7	▲3.6
FDP	Christian Schmitt	10,508	7.3	▲3.9	17,039	11.8	▲4.3
Greens	Winfried Anslinger	6,575	4.6	▲1.8	9,164	6.3	▲0.6
FAMILIE	Heinz Dabrock	4,102	2.9	▼0.5	3,030	2.1	▼0.6
NPD	Bernd Ehrreich	2,206	1.5	▼0.5	2,159	1.5	▼0.6
Pirates					2,043	1.4	
RRP					797	0.6	
MLPD					50	0.0	▼0.1
Informal votes		3,131			2,669		
Total valid votes		143,916			144,378		
Turnout		147,047	73.0	▼5.8			
CDU gain from SPD	Majority	3,592	2.5				

=== 2005 election ===
Federal election (2005):Homburg
Notes:	Blue background denotes the winner of the electorate vote. Pink background denotes a candidate elected from their party list. Yellow background denotes an electorate win by a list member, or other incumbent. A ✓ or ✗ denotes status of any incumbent, win or lose respectively.						
Party	Candidate	Votes	%	±%	Party votes	%	±%
SPD	✓ Astrid Klug	63,167	40.1	▼10.3	54,083	34.3	▼12.3
CDU	Ulli Meyer	51,579	32.7	▼2.9	45,447	28.8	▼5.1
Left	Horst Schock	24,287	15.4	▲14.4	28,640	18.2	▲16.8
FDP	Martina Engel-Otto	5,413	3.4	▼1.9	11,770	7.5	▲0.9
Familie	Heinz Dabrock	4,207	3.3	▲0.9	9,014	2.7	▲1.1
Greens	Barbara Wiehn	4,400	2.8	▼0.7	9,033	5.7	▼1.5
NPD	Bernd Ehrreich	3,186	2.0	▲1.0	3,262	2.1	▲1.4
GRAUEN					1,068	0.7	▲0.2
Independent	Elvira Ibraimkulova	226	0.1				
MLPD					146	0.1	
Informal votes		4,161			4,009		
Total valid votes		157,504			157,656		
Turnout		161,665	78.8	▼0.9			
SPD hold	Majority	11,588	7.4				
