= Zetel =

- Municipality
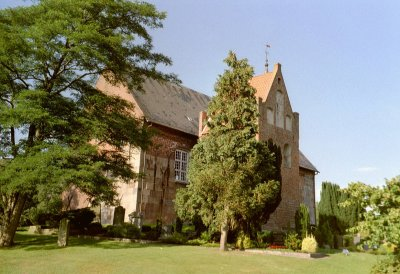
- Church of Saint Martin

- Flag Coat of arms

- Location of Zetel within Friesland district
- Interactive map of Zetel
- Location within Germany Location within Lower Saxony
- Coordinates: 53°25′11″N 07°58′27″E
- Country: Germany
- State: Lower Saxony
- District: Friesland
- Subdivisions: 15 districts

Government
  - Mayor: Heiner Lauxtermann (SPD)

Area
  - Total: 81.41 km^{2} (31.43 sq mi)
- Elevation: 2 m (6.6 ft)

Population (2025-12-31)
  - Total: 12,349
  - Density: 151.7/km^{2} (392.9/sq mi)
- Time zone: UTC+01:00 (CET)
  - Summer (DST): UTC+02:00 (CEST)
- Postal codes: 26340
- Dialling codes: 04453, 04452
- Vehicle registration: FRI
- Website: www.zetel.de

Zetel (German pronunciation: [ˈtseːtl̩]) is a municipality in the district of Friesland, Lower Saxony, Germany. It is situated approximately 15 km southwest of Wilhelmshaven, and 12 km west of Varel. Zetel is twinned with the county of Sutherland in the Highlands of Scotland.

Zetel Subdivisions
Astede	Collstede	Neuenburg	Spolsen
Astederfeld	Driefel	Neuenburgerfeld	Schweinebrück
Bohlenberge	Ellens	Ruttel	Klein Schweinebrück
Bohlenbergerfeld	Fuhrenkamp	Ruttelerfeld	Zetel

== Notable residents ==
- Johannes Bitter, professional Handball player
- grim104, German rapper, half of Berlin duo Zugezogen Maskulin
- Karin Evers-Meyer, politician (SPD)
- Wilhelm Kunst, wood sculptor
