= Hellmuth Heye =

German admiral and post-war politician

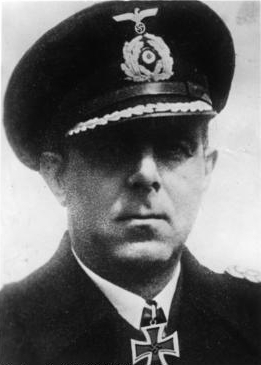
- Heye in 1941

Member of the Bundestag; for Wilhelmshaven – Friesland
- In office 6 October 1953 – 17 October 1961
- Preceded by: Johann Cramer
- Succeeded by: Johann Cramer

Personal details
- Born: Hellmuth Guido Alexander Heye; 9 August 1895 Beckingen, Germany
- Died: 10 November 1970 (aged 75) Mittelheim, West Germany
- Party: Christian Democratic Union
- Parent: Wilhelm Heye (father)
- Awards: Knight's Cross of the Iron Cross

Military service
- Allegiance: German Empire; Weimar Republic; Nazi Germany
- Branch/service: Imperial German Navy; Reichsmarine; Kriegsmarine
- Years of service: 1914–1945
- Rank: Vice admiral
- Commands: Admiral Hipper
- Battles/wars: World War I World War II: Operation Weserübung

Hellmuth Guido Alexander Heye (9 August 1895 – 10 November 1970) was a German admiral in World War II and politician in post-war Germany. He was a recipient of the Knight's Cross of the Iron Cross of Nazi Germany. He was the son of Wilhelm Heye.

== Naval career ==
Heye graduated from high school in Berlin in early 1914 and immediately joined the Imperial Navy. From April 1939 to September 1940 he commanded the Heavy Cruiser Admiral Hipper. While taking his ship to Trondheim in April 1940 to land invasion troops there (Operation Weserübung), he encountered the British destroyer Glowworm and sank it. Heye sent a message to the British Admiralty through the Red Cross praising the gallantry of Glowworm's commander and crew, and this contributed to LtCdr Gerard Roope receiving the earliest Victoria Cross of World War II, although the award was not made until 1945.

Heye received the Knight's Cross of the Iron Cross on 18 January 1941. In 1942 he was promoted to vice admiral, and from September to November 1942 he was commanding admiral of the German naval forces in the Black Sea. From April 1944 onward he was commanding admiral of the small naval combat forces, which included mini-submarines, combat divers, etc.

== Civilian career ==
After the war Heye published a number of works on naval strategy, history and warfare as a member of the Naval Historical Team. He subsequently advised the German government on issues concerning the establishment and organization of a new military. In 1953 he joined the center-right party CDU (Christian Democratic Union) of Chancellor Konrad Adenauer and represented this party in the Federal Parliament (Bundestag) from 1953 to 1961, elected for the district of Wilhelmshaven – Friesland.

On 8 November 1961 the Bundestag elected him unanimously as its Ombudsman for the Military (Wehrbeauftragter). In the autumn of 1964, Heye published a series of articles in the German news journal Quick, warning of a risk of the German military once again drifting into isolation from society at large. This triggered a vigorous and sharply worded debate between him and the ministry of defense. Frustrated by what he perceived to be inadequate support from Parliament, Heye resigned his position on 10 November 1964.

== Awards ==
- Iron Cross (1914) 2nd Class (14 February 1918), 1st Class (15 March 1922)
- Friedrich August Cross 2nd Class (14 February 1918)
- U-boat War Badge (20 November 1926)
- Wehrmacht Long Service Award 4th to 2nd Class (2 October 1936)
- Commander of the Order of the Crown of Italy (13 December 1937)
- Sudetenland Medal (22 May 1939)
- Memel Medal (26 October 1939) 1st Class (11 February 1939)
- Clasp to the Iron Cross (1939) 2nd Class (23 February 1940), 1st Class (14 April 1940)
- Knight's Cross of the Iron Cross on 18 January 1941 as Kapitän zur See and commander of heavy cruiser Admiral Hipper
- High Seas Fleet Badge (16 February 1942)
- Officer of the Order of the Crown of Romania (15 January 1943)
