= Markus Uhl =

German politician

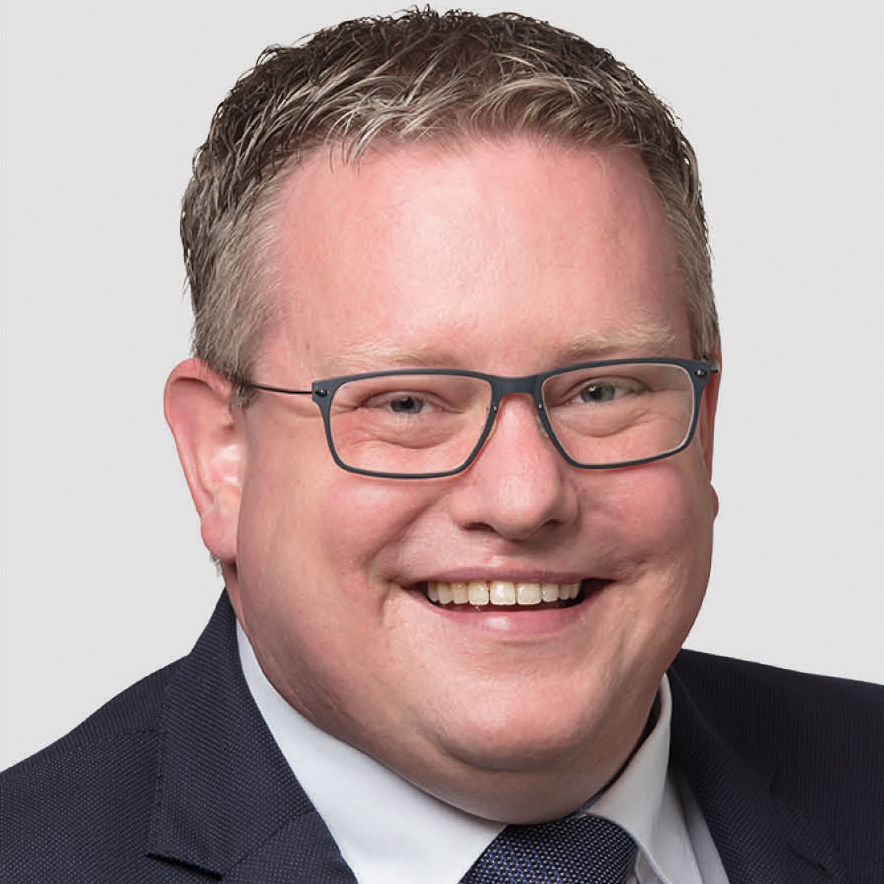
- Markus Uhl in 2017

Member of the Bundestag for Saarland
- Incumbent
- Assumed office 18 July 2017
- Preceded by: Alexander Funk

Personal details
- Born: 31 October 1979 (age 46) Cologne, West Germany (now Germany)
- Party: CDU
- Education: Saarland University

Markus Alexander Uhl (born 31 August 1979) is a German politician of the Christian Democratic Union (CDU) who served as a member of the Bundestag from the state of Saarland from 2017 to 2025. Following his departure from parliament, he returned to a civil service position in Saarland's State Ministry of the Interior.

== Early life and education ==
Born in Cologne, North Rhine-Westphalia, Uhl studied business economics at the Saarland University.

== Political career ==
From 2017 to 2022, Uhl served as Secretary General of the CDU in Saarland, under the leadership of successive chairs Annegret Kramp-Karrenbauer (2017–2018) and Tobias Hans (2018–2022).

Uhl became member of the Bundestag for Homburg in the 2017 German federal election. In parliament, he was a member of the Committee on Transport and Digital Infrastructure and the Budget Committee. In this capacity, he served as his parliamentary group's rapporteur on the annual budget of the Federal Ministry of Justice and Consumer Protection.

In addition to his committee assignments, Uhl was a member of the German delegation to the Franco-German Parliamentary Assembly from 2019.

In 2021, Uhl was defeated for re-election by Esra Limbacher, but returned to Parliament on the list after the resignation of Peter Altmaier.
