= Esra Limbacher =

German politician (born 1989)

Member of the Bundestag for Saarland
- Incumbent
- Assumed office 26 October 2021
- Constituency: Homburg

Personal details
- Born: 1 May 1989 (age 37) Wiesbaden, West Germany (now Germany)
- Party: Social Democratic Party
- Education: Saarland University; University of Exeter (LLM)

Esra-Leon Limbacher (born 1 May 1989) is a German politician of the Social Democratic Party (SPD) who has been serving as a member of the Bundestag since 2021, representing the Homburg district. Previously, he was a member of the Saarland state parliament Landtag of Saarland until November 2021.

== Early life and education ==
Limbacher was born in the West German city of Wiesbaden and grew up in Limbach in the municipality of Kirkel.

After graduation from high school in the Saarpfalz district Limbacher studied law at Saarland University in order to become a lawyer. He studied law both in Germany and England as a scholarship holder of the Friedrich Ebert Foundation. At the University of Exeter, he obtained a Master of Laws with a focus on international commercial law. He completed his law studies in Germany, again at Saarland University, specialising in German and international tax law. He passed his second state law examination in the Higher Regional Court District of Zweibrücken, Rhineland-Palatinate.

== Early career ==
Professionally, Limbacher passed through stations in various law firms before becoming an officer in the higher service of the Saarland state administration. Here he was deployed as a lawyer within the taskforce for cross-border commuters. Since 2020, Limbacher has been pursuing a doctorate and is a lecturer at Saarland University.

== Political career ==
=== Early beginnings ===
Limbacher entered the SPD in 2005. Here he held various political offices in the youth organization Jussos and the SPD. In the Jusos, Limbacher was involved as district chairman of Saarpfalz and deputy state chairman in Saarland. In 2009, he was elected to the local council of the municipality of Kirkel in the local elections. Since 2019, he has also been a member of the Saarpfalz district council and parliamentary group leader of the SPD.

Since 2021, Esra Limbacher has been the district chairman of the SPD Saarpfalz, together with Christine Streichert-Clivot.

In the 2017 federal election, he stood as a candidate for the direct mandate in the constituency of Homburg. With 31.4% of the first votes, he lost to the CDU politician Markus Uhl, who received 33.6% of the votes. In June 2021, he succeeded Stefan Pauluhn in the Saarland Landtag. In the 2017 Saarland state election in Saarland, Limbacher had initially missed out on entry due to his list placement.

=== Member of the German Parliament, 2021–present ===
Limbacher was also nominated by the SPD as a candidate for the 2021 federal election. This time he received the most votes with 36.6%, followed by Markus Uhl, who received 26.1% of the votes. This meant that he entered the 20th German Bundestag as a directly elected MP. In the course of this, he resigned his Landtag mandate. Susanne Kasztantowicz succeeded him in the Landtag.

In parliament, Limbacher served on the Committee on Legal Affairs and the Committee on Economic Affairs from 2021 to 2025. From 2022 to 2025, he was the SME representative of the SPD parliamentary group in the Bundestag. In November 2022, he was elected as deputy economic policy spokesman of the SPD parliamentary group in the Bundestag after his predecessor Falko Mohrs became Minister of Science in Lower Saxony.

Within his parliamentary group, Limbacher has been part of the Seeheim Circle.

In the negotiations to form a Grand Coalition under the leadership of Friedrich Merz's Christian Democrats (CDU together with the Bavarian CSU) and the SPD following the 2025 German elections, Limbacher was part of the SPD delegation in the working group on government reform and cutting red tape, led by Philipp Amthor, Daniela Ludwig and Sonja Eichwede.

Since 2025, Limbacher has been serving as deputy chair of his parliamentary group, under the leadership of chairman Matthias Miersch. In this capacity, he oversees the group's legislative activities on housing, agriculture, the environment and climate action. Within his parliamentary group, he has also been serving as one of the three speakers of the Seeheim Circle since 2025.

== Other activities ==
- St. John Accident Assistance (JHU), Member
