= Sophie Schröder =

German actress (1781–1868)

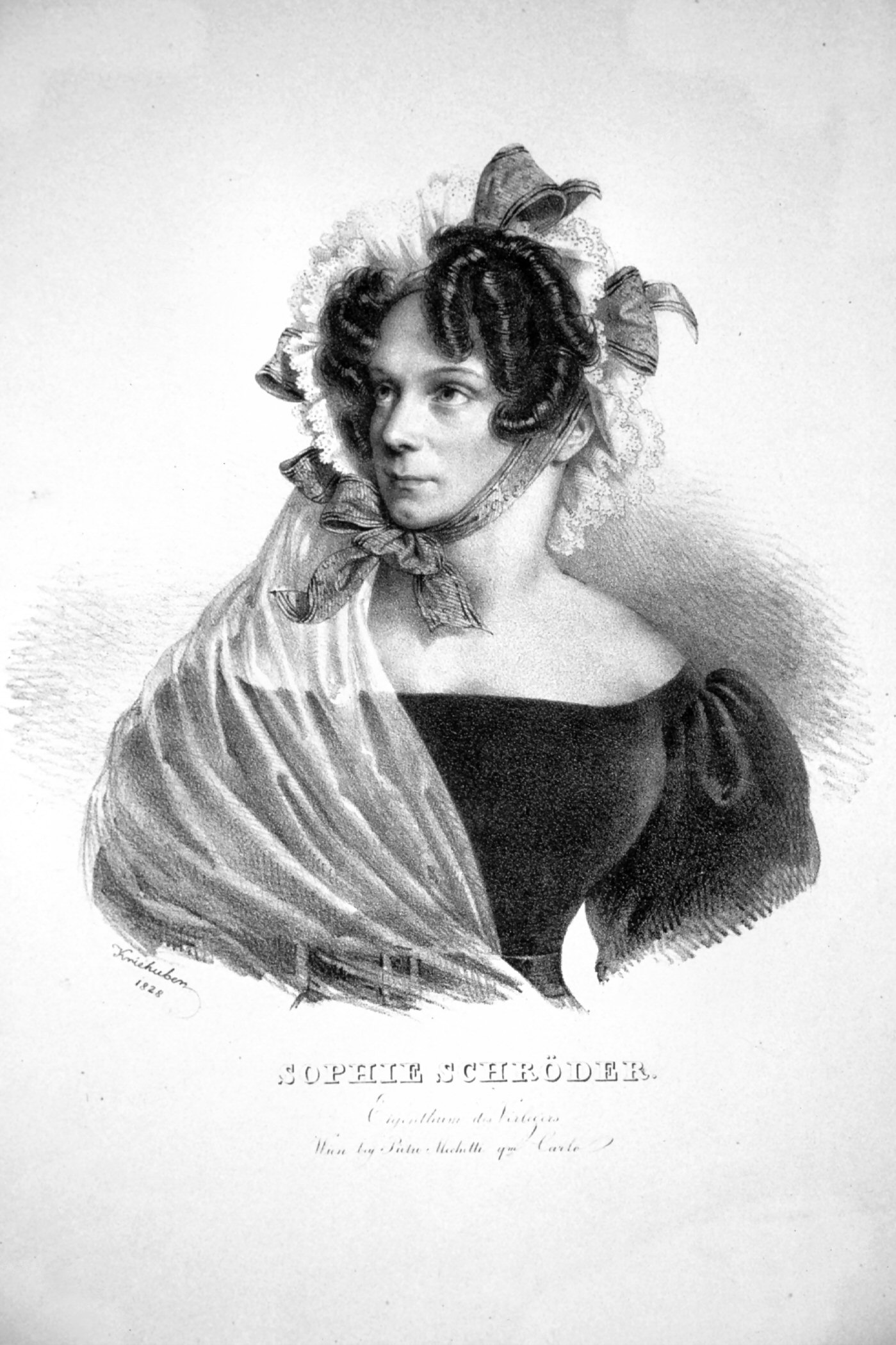
Sophie Schröder, 1828

Sophie Antonie Luise Schröder (née Bürger; 1 March 1781 – 25 February 1868) was a German actress and an early adopter of spoken word performances combined with music.

Born at Paderborn, the daughter of an actor, Gottfried Bürger, she made her first appearance in opera at St Petersburg, in 1793. On Kotzebue's recommendation she was engaged for the Vienna Court theatre in 1798, and here and in Munich and Hamburg she won great successes in tragic roles like Marie Stuart, Phèdre, Merope, Lady Macbeth, and Isabella in The Bride of Messina, which gave her the reputation of being "the German Siddons."

She retired in 1840 and lived in Augsburg and Munich until her death in 1868. She had married, in 1795, an actor, Stollmers (properly Smets), from whom she separated in 1799. In 1804, she married the tenor Friedrich Schröder, and after his death in 1818, she married the actor, Wilhelm Kunst in 1825. Schröder's eldest daughter was the opera singer, Wilhelmine Schröder-Devrient. She had several illegitimate children with the painter Moritz Michael Daffinger.
