= Moses Arndt =

German doctor, author and politician (born 1964)

Member of the Bundestag for Saarland
- Incumbent
- Assumed office 25 March 2025
- Constituency: Homburg (electoral district)

Personal details
- Born: 18 March 1964 (age 62) Oberbexbach, Bexbach, Saarland
- Party: Die Linke
- Other political affiliations: Anarchist Pogo Party of Germany

Michael Rudi Arndt, known as Moses Arndt, (born 18 March 1964) is a German doctor and politician from Die Linke. He is also an author and publisher in the field of the hardcore punk movement. He is the editor of the hardcore punk fanzine ZAP and has worked full-time as a general practitioner since 2007. He has been a member of the 21st Bundestag since 2025.

== Life ==
Arndt was born in Oberbexbach, Bexbach, Saarland.

After his first fanzines, such as Vox Vulgi, which Arndt designed himself as a young punk and sold at concerts, he co-founded the fanzine Trust in 1986. The model was the US punk fanzine Maximumrocknroll. At that time, Arndt was the singer of the hardcore band Challenger Crew , which released three albums. Arndt left the Trust editorial team in 1988 and founded his own fanzine Zap , which was to have a significant impact on the German hardcore scene. He was not only the editor, but also wrote numerous articles, conducted interviews and often appeared in various national media. Well-known authors of Zap included Martin Büsser, Klaus N. Frick and Karl Nagel. he paper also gained greater fame through its journalistic documentation of the Chaos Days in Hanover and the punk subculture itself. After the extremely violent Chaos Days of 1995, Moses Arndt appeared on various talk shows such as Boulevard Bio, Live aus dem Schlachthof and Arabella. In 1995, MTV Europe broadcast a "Punk Special" about Europe, in which Moses was interviewed together with the band Hammerhead and their singer Tobias Scheiße. In addition, an interview with Arndt and some other punks on the subject of Chaos Days appeared in Stern in 1995. The idea of publishing the Zap weekly failed; the last issue for the time being appeared in 1998. Arndt also wrote for magazines such as Spex and Rock Hard. At the beginning of 2019, Arndt decided to resurrect the Zap. Since November 2019, it has been published again, exclusively in print form.

After a long stay in New York, Arndt opened a piercing and tattoo studio in 1993. In 2000, he began studying medicine. He now has his own medical practice; his main areas of activity are tattoo removal using lasers and subcutaneous jewellery insertion. In 2007, he was awarded the degree of Doctor of Medicine (Dr. med.) by the Medical Faculty of the University of Saarland. In addition, he worked as a trained ring doctor at martial arts events such as boxing and Muay Thai.

His novel Chaostage was made into a film by Tarek Ehlail in 2007 under the title Chaostage – We Are Punks! He wrote the screenplay for Ehlail's 2010 film Gegengerade – Niemand siegt am Millerntor .

== Politics ==
Arndt co-founded the Anarchist Pogo Party of Germany in 1981, and was one of its leading candidates in the 1998 German federal election, coming within 5% of winning a seat.

In the 2025 German federal election, Moses Arndt ran as the top candidate of the party Die Linke Saarland and as a direct candidate in the Homburg constituency. In his constituency, he received 6.6 percent of the first votes and was able to enter the German Bundestag via first place on his party's Saarland state list.

== Publications ==
- Moses A.: Chaostage. Roman. Dreieck Verlag, Mainz 1998, ISBN 978-3-930559-54-1
- Michael Arndt: Transfer von Entspannungsverfahren aus der stationären Rehabilitation in den Alltag der Patienten. Dissertation, Universität Saarbrücken, 2007, Digitalisat
- Moses A.: New York City Hardcore. Roman. Ventil Verlag, Mainz 2012, ISBN 978-3-931555-38-2
