= Gabriele Iwersen =

German politician (1939-2025)

Member of the Bundestag; for Friesland – Wilhelmshaven
- In office 20 December 1990 – 17 October 2002
- Preceded by: Herbert Ehrenberg
- Succeeded by: Karin Evers-Meyer

Mayor of Wilhelmshaven
- In office 1986–1991

Personal details
- Born: Gabriele Grigoleit; 25 August 1939 Berlin, Germany
- Died: 7 December 2025 (aged 86) Oldenburg, Germany
- Party: Social Democratic
- Spouse: Heiko Iwersen (died)
- Children: 2
- Education: TU Berlin
- Occupation: Politician; architect

Gabriele Iwersen (née Grigoleit; 25 October 1939 – 7 December 2025) was a German politician who was a member of the Bundestag for Friesland – Wilhelmshaven – Wittmund from 1990 to 2002. Prior to her election, she worked as an architect at her husband's family firm, and she served as mayor of Wilhelmshaven from 1986 until 1991.

== Early life and career ==
Iwersen was born on 25 October 1939 in Berlin. She attended the Goethe-Gymnasium, Lichterfelde, graduating in 1958. She then obtained her Diplom from the Technische Universität Berlin and spent a year at Stanford University (1964-1965) on a DAAD scholarship, giving a seminar on German housing construction.

After working in Berlin as a construction manager, Iwersen became an architect at Iwersen Architekten, a architecture firm her family ran. The firm's work included the 1979 renovation of Banter Kirche in Wilhelmshaven. Throughout her career, she worked as a freelancer.

== Political career ==
Iwersen joined the Social Democratic Party of Germany in 1971, and later the local SPD executive committee in 1972. She was elected to Wilhelmshaven city council in 1976, and she served as mayor of Wilhelmshaven from 1986 until 1991. In the 1990 German federal election, she was elected to the Bundestag constituency of Friesland – Wilhelmshaven – Wittmund. She was elected to the same seat two more times, in 1994 and 1998. She was a member of the Committee for Spatial Planning, Construction and Urban Development, as well as the commission on the relocation of Bundestag into the Reichstag building. She stepped down in 2002.

Iwersen served as project manager of Bürger für Wilhelmshaven, helping restore the old water tower, as well as the women empowerment organization Arbeitsplatzinitiative für Frauen. She was also a board member for Radio Jade, as well as a founding member of Förderverein Küstenmuseum Wilhelmshaven.

== Personal life ==
She was married to Heiko Iwersen, her business partner at Iwersen Architekten, until his death. They had two children.

Iwersen died on 8 December 2025 in Oldenburg, aged 86.
