= Anarchist Pogo Party of Germany =

Political party in Germany

Anarchist Pogo Party of Germany Anarchistische Pogo-Partei Deutschlands
- Abbreviation: APPD
- Leader: Saskia "Omma" Schwabeland
- Founded: 1981
- Newspaper: Armes Deutschland
- Youth wing: Asocial Youth
- Ideology: Political satire; Anarchism; Direct democracy
- Colors: Black & White

Website
- www.appd-gdnk.de

The Anarchist Pogo Party of Germany (German: Anarchistische Pogo Partei Deutschlands; APPD) is a German frivolous party which campaigns in support of unemployment benefits, direct democracy and the Balkanization of Germany. Established in 1981, it has run in a number of elections since it registered as a political party in 1997.

== History ==
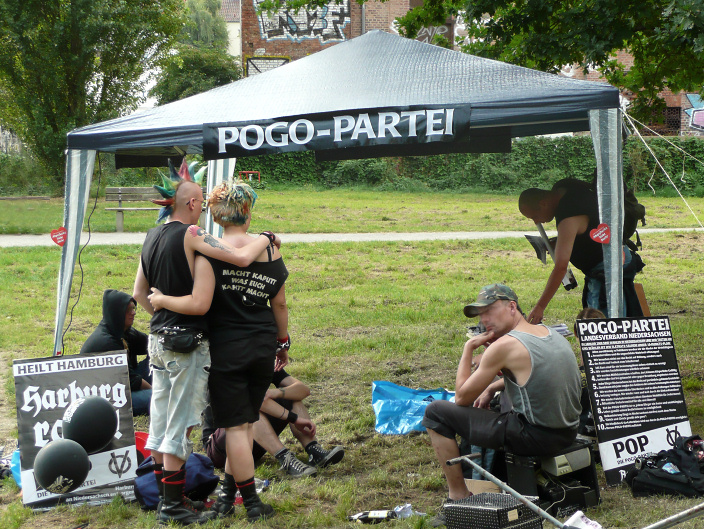
APPD stall in Hanover in 2008

The Anarchist Pogo Party of Germany (German: Anarchistische Pogo Partei Deutschlands; APPD) was first established in 1981, by a group of punks in Hanover. One of them, Moses Arndt, was later elected to the Bundestag in 2025 as a member of Die Linke. It soon became a party for the emerging German punk subculture, announcing itself to the public in 1984. The new party sought to create a support base from "non-voters, plebs and benefit fraudsters".

For most of the 1980s and 1990s, the party failed to generate substantial media attention. This changed when it began participating in elections and officially registered as a political party. It first ran in the 1997 Hamburg state election, then in the subsequent 1998 German federal election. The party ran with the promise that it would give free beer to anyone who voted for them. Despite this, it won only ~0.1% of the vote. In the 2011 Berlin state election, the APPD claimed to have won a plurality of the vote, as it had instructed supporters to either vote for it or to abstain; the party therefore claimed all 39.8% of eligible voters who did not turn out. The party attempted to run in the 2021 German federal election under the slogan "work is shit", but their application was rejected, as it had only been submitted electronically.

== Proposals ==
The APPD programme mixes together elements of political satire and serious proposals for reform. As a frivolous party, its aim is to challenge the Establishment and political correctness. Unlike classical anarchism, which rejects the existence of the state, the APPD supports a limited state in which citizens participate in decision making through direct democracy and e-democracy. It takes the "Groucho-Marxist" approach to anti-statism, suggesting that people wean themselves off the state.

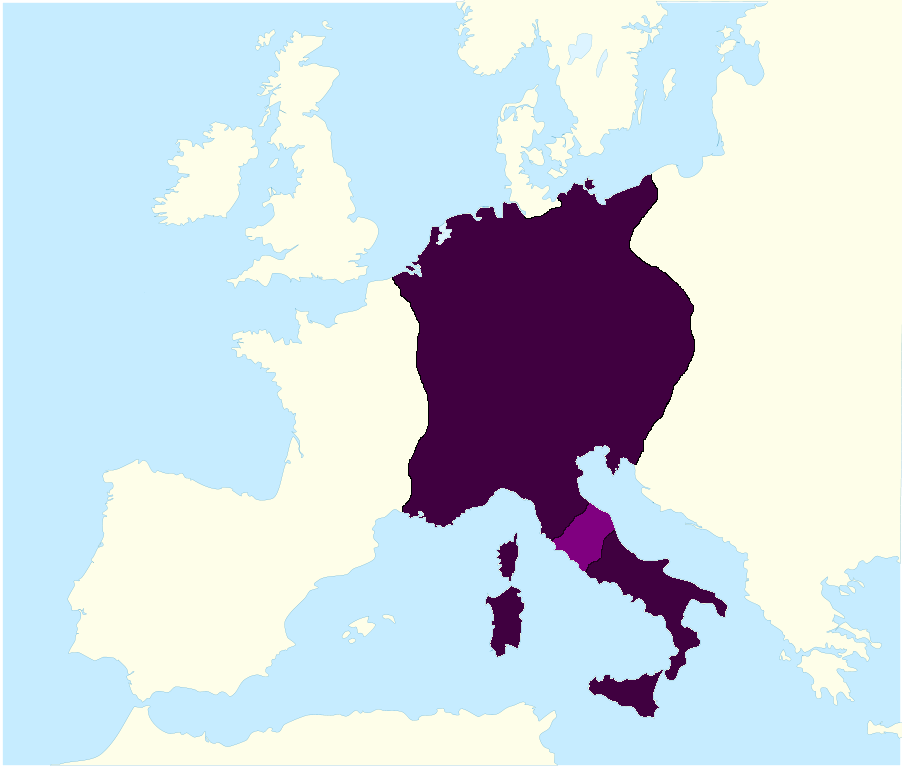
The Holy Roman Empire at its greatest extent in the 13th century

The APPD calls for the borders of Germany to be restored to those of the Holy Roman Empire, as they were in 1237 under Frederick II. The party further proposes the "Balkanization" of Germany by dividing the country into separate cantons for each of the so-called "pogo-races": one for the "social parasites" who live off state welfare; one for the "achievers" who pursue careers and earn money; and one for violent people such as criminals and neo-Nazis to fight each other. By creating separate living spaces for different classes of people, it hopes to protect "pogo-anarchists" from normality.

The party adopts an anti-work ethic, which celebrates idleness and calls for the "right to be unemployed". It demands the extension of paid unemployment to all, as a human right. The party also proposes the replacement of the old age pension with a "young age pension", to allow young people to spend their time enjoying themselves rather than working. As a response to the 2011 Germany E. coli O104:H4 outbreak, it suggested that people adopt an all-beer diet. According to sociologist Knud Andresen, the party had something of a "cult of alcohol consumption". Among its slogans are "power to the anti-socials!"; Another calls for the "total re-stupefication of mankind".

== See also ==
- Anarcho-punk
- List of political parties in Germany
- List of frivolous political parties

== Bibliography ==
- Andresen, Knud (2020). "Memories of Being Punk in West Germany: Personal and Shared Recollections in Life Stories". In van der Steen, Bart; Verburgh, Thierry (eds.). Researching Subcultures, Myth and Memory. Palgrave Studies in the History of Subcultures and Popular Music. Palgrave Macmillan. doi:10.1007/978-3-030-41909-7_10.
- Arzheimer, Kai (2010). "Fringe Parties". In Kurian, George T.; Alt, James E.; Chambers, Simone; Garrett, Geoffrey; Levi, Margaret; Mcclain, Paula D. (eds.). The Encyclopedia of Political Science. Washington, D.C.: CQ Press.
- Hayton, Jeff (2022). Culture from the Slums: Punk Rock in East and West Germany. Oxford University Press. ISBN 978-0-19-886618-3.
- Jacobs, Howy (2012). "Of pirates and pogos". EMBO Reports. 13 (9): 765. doi:10.1038/embor.2012.108. ISSN 1469-221X. PMC 3432800.
- Lucardie, Paul (April 2001). Democrats, and other extremists: A Comparative Analysis of Extremist Parties in Germany and The Netherlands. Democracy and the New Extremist Challenge in Europe, Joint Sessions of the ECPR. Grenoble.
- Novak, William J. (2015). "Beyond Max Weber: The need for a democratic (not aristocratic) theory of the modern state". The Tocqueville Review. 36 (1): 43–91. doi:10.3138/ttr.36.1.43.
- Robel, Yvonne (2021). ""Protest? Bollocks!" On Public Perceptions of Punk in West Germany". Moving the social. 66: 89–110. doi:10.46586/mts.66.2021.89-110.
- Schröter, Melani (2015). "80,000,000 HOOLIGANS: Discourse of resistance to racism and xenophobia in German punk lyrics 1991–1994". Critical Discourse Studies. 12 (4): 398–425. doi:10.1080/17405904.2014.1002508.
