= Siemtje Möller =

German politician (born 1983)

Siemtje Möller MdB
- Möller in 2021

Parliamentary State Secretary for Defense
- In office 8 December 2021 – 6 May 2025 Serving with Thomas Hitschler
- Minister: Christine Lambrecht; Boris Pistorius
- Preceded by: Thomas Silberhorn
- Succeeded by: Nils Schmid; Sebastian Hartmann

Member of the Bundestag; for Friesland – Wilhelmshaven – Wittmund
- Incumbent
- Assumed office 24 October 2017
- Preceded by: Karin Evers-Meyer

Personal details
- Born: Siemtje Victoria Regine Ilse Santjer Möller; 20 July 1983 (age 43) Emden, West Germany
- Party: Social Democratic (since 2010)
- Spouse: Sören Mandel (m. 2018)
- Children: 2
- Education: University of Göttingen (BA)
- Website: Official website

Siemtje Victoria Regine Ilse Santjer Möller (German pronunciation: [ˈziːmtjə ˈmœlɐ]; born 20 July 1983) is a German teacher and politician of the Social Democratic Party (SPD) who has been serving as a member of the Bundestag from the state of Lower Saxony since the 2017 elections.

In addition to her parliamentary work, Möller served as Parliamentary State Secretary in the Federal Ministry of Defence in the coalition government of Chancellor Olaf Scholz from 2021 to 2025. Since 2025, she has served as the deputy chair of the SPD parliamentary group in the Bundestag. Möller is a member of the Seeheim Circle, the more right-leaning fraction of the SPD.

== Early life and education ==
Möller was born on 20 July 1983 in Emden, Lower Saxony, West Germany. She spent her childhood in Emden and later moved to Oldenburg, where she completed her secondary education at the Liebfrauenschule gymnasium, graduating in 2003.

Möller initially enrolled at RWTH Aachen University in 2003, where she studied technical editing within the field of informatics and communication sciences. In 2004, she transferred to the University of Göttingen, where she pursued a teaching degree specializing in French, Spanish, and political science, completing her first state examination in 2011.

During her studies, she worked as a tutor at the Department of Political Science at the University of Göttingen. There, she developed and led an English-language interdisciplinary seminar on the United Nations Security Council, which earned her the Faculty of Social Sciences' teaching award in the 2009/2010 winter semester. Möller also completed internships at various international institutions, including the United Nations Headquarters in New York, BBJ Consulting in Brussels, and the World Bank in Washington, D.C.

Prior to the birth of her first son, she worked as a teacher in gymnasiums in Braunschweig, Berlin and Wilhelmshaven.

== Political career ==
Möller became member of the Bundestag in the 2017 German federal election, representing the Friesland – Wilhelmshaven – Wittmund district. She served on the Defense Committee from 2018 until 2021, where she was her parliamentary group's spokesperson from 2020 until 2021. In addition to her committee assignments, she co-chairs the German-Ukrainian Parliamentary Friendship Group.

Within her parliamentary group, Möller served as one of the three speakers of the Seeheim Circle (alongside Dirk Wiese and Dagmar Ziegler) from 2020 to 2022; she succeeded Johannes Kahrs in that position and was in turn followed by Marja-Liisa Völlers.

In the negotiations to form a so-called traffic light coalition of the SPD, the Green Party and the Free Democratic Party (FDP) following the 2021 federal elections, Möller was part of her party's delegation in the working group on foreign policy, defence, development cooperation and human rights, co-chaired by Heiko Maas, Omid Nouripour and Alexander Graf Lambsdorff. In the negotiations to form a Grand Coalition under the leadership of Friedrich Merz's Christian Democrats (CDU together with the Bavarian CSU) and the SPD following the 2025 German elections, she was again part of the SPD delegation in the working group on foreign affairs, defense, development cooperation and human rights, this time led by Johann Wadephul, Florian Hahn and Svenja Schulze.

Since 2025, Möller has been serving as deputy chair of her parliamentary group, under the leadership of chairman Matthias Miersch. In this capacity, she oversees the group's legislative activities on foreign affairs, defence, development cooperation, human rights and the Council of Europe.

== Personal life ==
Möller married fellow teacher and SPD member Sören Mandel in 2018, and the couple has two sons. They live together in Varel.

== Other activities ==
=== Corporate boards ===
- GIZ, Member of the Supervisory Board (since 2025)

=== Non-profit organizations ===
- Berlin Security Conference, Member of the Advisory Board (since 2022)
- Centre for International Peace Operations (ZIF), Ex-Officio Member of the Supervisory Board (since 2022)
- German Foundation for Peace Research (DSF), Member of the Board (since 2022)
- Federal Foundation for the Reappraisal of the SED Dictatorship, Member of the Board of Trustees (since 2022)
- German Institute for International and Security Affairs (SWP), Member of the Council (since 2022)
- Business Forum of the Social Democratic Party of Germany, Member of the Political Advisory Board (since 2020)
- Deutsche Maritime Akademie, Member of the Advisory Board
- Education and Science Workers' Union (GEW), Member
- IG Metall, Member
