= Karin Evers-Meyer =

German politician (born 1949)

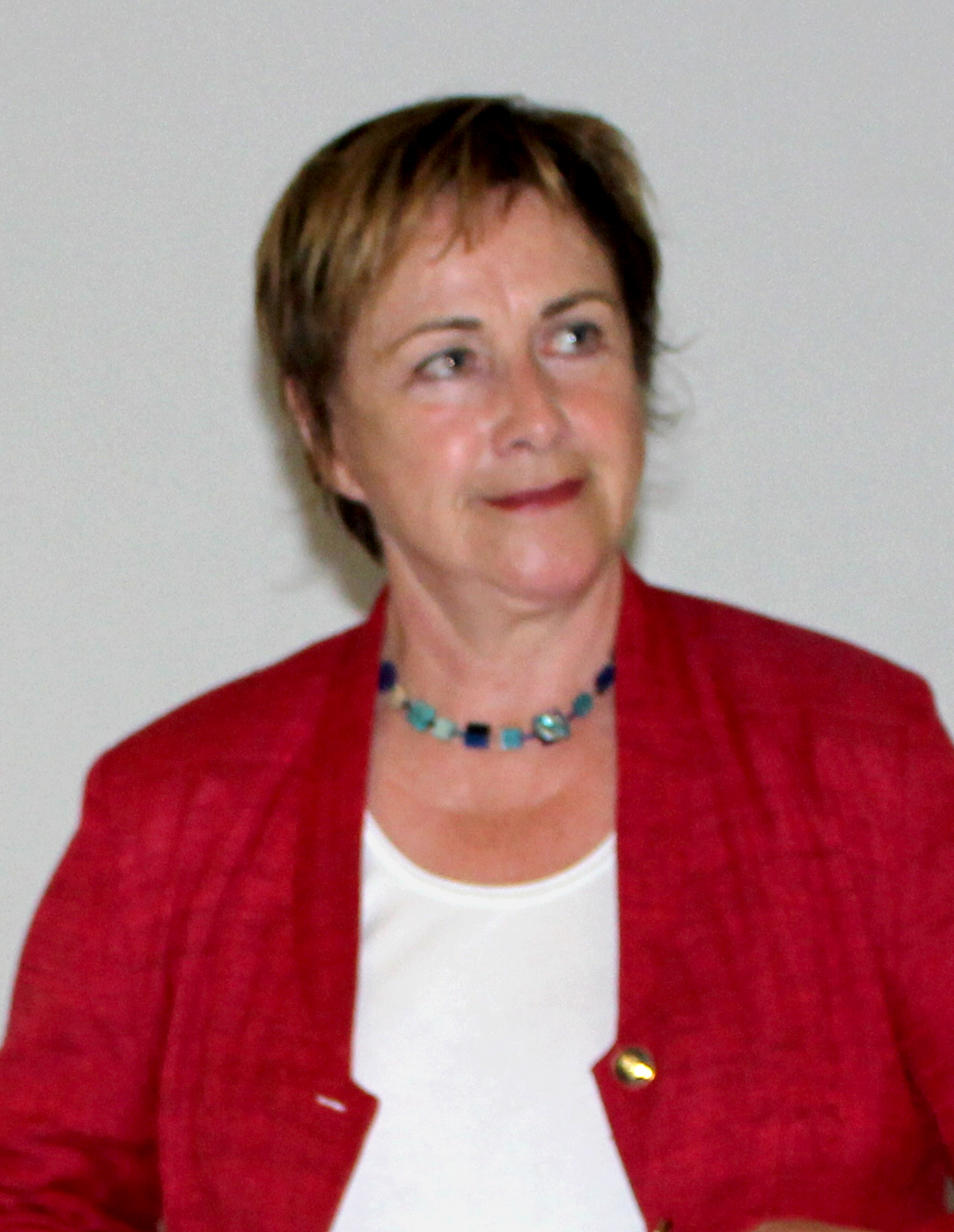
- Evers-Meyer in 2013

Member of the Bundestag
- In office 17 October 2002 – 24 October 2017
- Preceded by: Gabriele Iwersen
- Succeeded by: Siemtje Möller
- Constituency: Friesland – Wilhelmshaven (2002–2013); Friesland – Wilhelmshaven – Wittmund (2013–2017)

Personal details
- Born: Karin Evers; 10 September 1949 (age 77) Neuenburg, West Germany
- Party: Social Democratic
- Children: 2

Karin Evers-Meyer (née Evers; born 10 September 1949) is a German politician of the Social Democratic Party (SPD).

== Political career ==
A former journalist and author, Evers-Meyer was first elected member of the German Bundestag in the 2002 federal elections.

Between 2005 and 2009, Evers-Meyer – herself a mother of a child with disabilities – served as the Federal Government Commissioner for Matters relating to Disabled Persons (at the Federal Ministry of Labour and Social Affairs) in the second cabinet of Chancellor Angela Merkel. Ahead of the 2009 elections, German foreign minister Frank-Walter Steinmeier included her in his shadow cabinet of 10 women and eight men for the Social Democrats' campaign to unseat Merkel as chancellor.

Following the 2009 federal elections, Evers-Meyer was appointed the SPD parliamentary group's deputy spokesperson on defense policy. A member of the Budget Committee since the 2013 elections, she served as the group's rapporteur on the budget of the Federal Ministry of Defense (BMVg). In addition, she was a member of the German delegation to the NATO Parliamentary Assembly, led by Karl A. Lamers.

In the negotiations to form a coalition government following the 2013 federal elections, Evers-Meyer was part of the SPD delegation in the working group on foreign affairs, defense policy and development cooperation, led by Thomas de Maizière and Frank-Walter Steinmeier.

In late 2014, Evers-Meyer was considered as successor of Hellmut Königshaus as Parliamentary Commissioner for the Armed Forces but withdrew her candidacy when Hans-Peter Bartels emerged as her parliamentary group's nominee; she would have been the first woman to hold that office.

In July 2016, Evers-Meyer announced that she would not stand in the 2017 federal elections but instead resign from active politics by the end of the parliamentary term.

== Political positions ==
=== Relations with the African continent ===
Evers-Meyer has in the past voted in favor of German participation in United Nations peacekeeping missions as well as in United Nations-mandated European Union peacekeeping missions on the African continent, such as in Somalia – both Operation Atalanta (2009, 2010, 2011, 2014 and 2015) and EUTM Somalia (2014, 2015 and 2016) –, Darfur/Sudan (2010, 2011, 2012, 2013 and 2014), South Sudan (2011, 2012, 2013 and 2014), Mali – both EUTM Mali (2014 and 2015) and MINUSMA (2014 and 2015) –, the Central African Republic (2014), and Liberia (2015). In 2013, she abstained from the votes on extending the mandate for participation in EUTM Somalia and EUTM Mali, and she voted against the participation in Operation Atalanta in 2012 and 2013.

== Other activities ==
- Association of the German Army (FKW), Member of the Presidium
- Federal Academy for Security Policy (BAKS), Member of the Advisory Board (since 2015)
- EWE AG, Member of the Supervisory Board (2002–2005)
- EWE Stiftung, Member of the Board (2002–2012)
