= Grim104 =

grim104
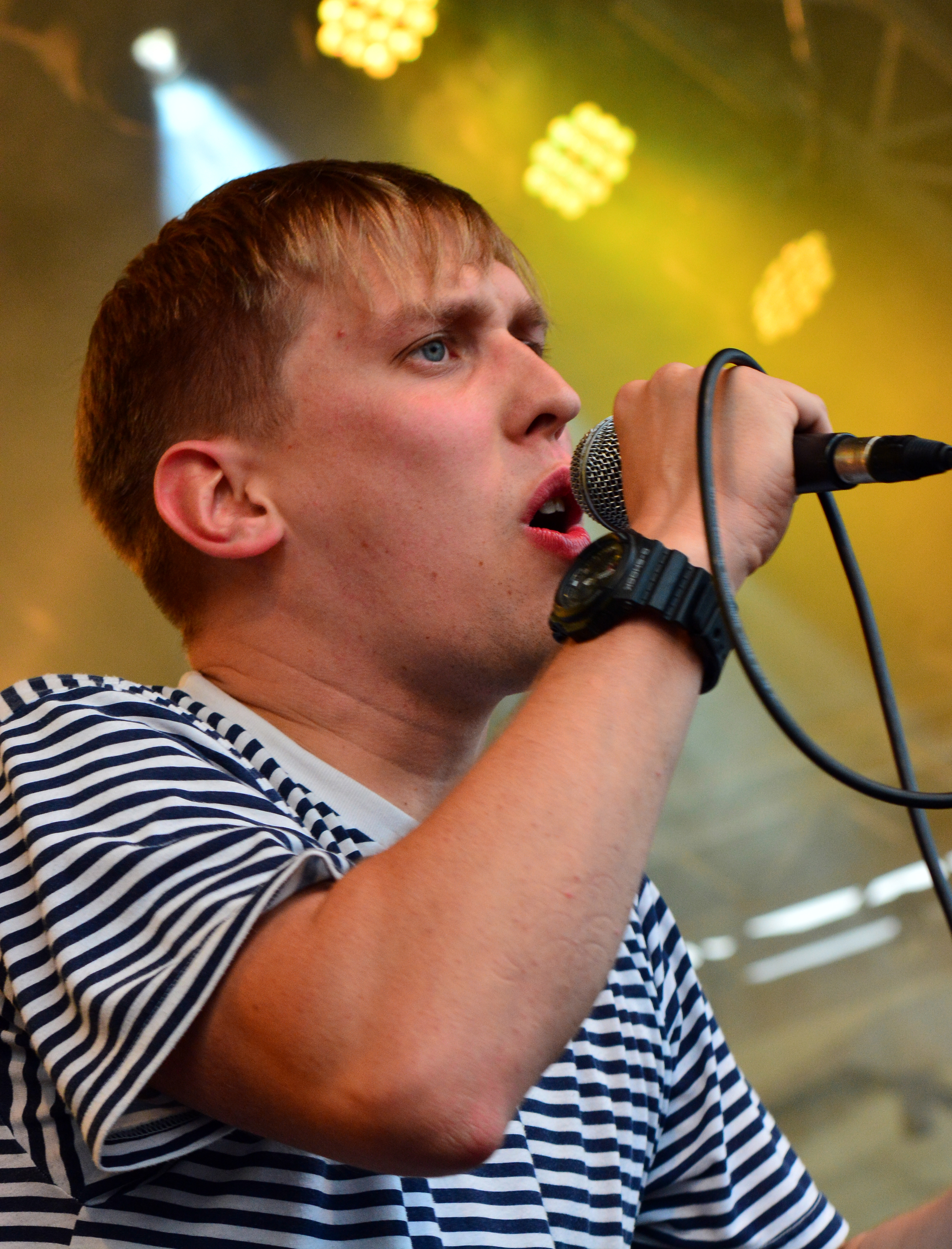
- Grim104 performing in 2014

Background information
- Born: Moritz Wilken; 1988 (age 37–38); Zetel, Friesland, Lower Saxony, West Germany
- Genres: German hip hop, Rap
- Occupation: Rapper
- Years active: 2010–present
- Label: Buback

Moritz Wilken (born 19 May 1988 in Meerbusch), better known by his stage name grim104, is a German rapper, who is signed to the Hamburg label Buback. Together with the rapper Testo he forms the hip-hop duo Zugezogen Maskulin.

== Career ==
Wilken was born in the city of Meerbusch, North Rhine-Westphalia, in 1988. At the age of four he moved to the town of Zetel in Lower Saxony. After moving to Berlin in 2007, he completed a voluntary social year in a hospital. He then worked as an editor of the 'Polli-Magazins' and in 2010 began an internship at the editorial office of German rap website 'Rap.de' under the direction of journalist Marcus Staiger. It was during this internship that grim104 met fellow hip-hop musician Testo. Later they formed the duo Zugezogen Maskulin together. The band name is an allusion to former hip-hop duo Westberlin Maskulin formed in the late 1990s by the rappers Kool Savas and Taktloss. According to a statement by Testo it was also because the term 'zugezogen' (moved to (Berlin) in contrast to being born there) functioned as an insult in the hip-hop scene. With Kauft nicht bei Zugezogenen! (Do Not Buy From Newcomers!) the duo released their first album in December 2011. This album was offered as a free download. In Autumn 2012 they released a video for their song Rotkohl (Red Cabbage). Videos were later also released for Entartete Kunst (Degenerated Art) and Undercut Tumblrblog.

On October 31, 2019, Halloween, grim104 released another solo-EP called "Das Grauen, das Grauen".

== Discography ==
Albums

- 2011: Kauft nicht bei Zugezogenen! (Don't buy from newcomers!) (Free album with Testo as Zugezogen Maskulin)
- 2013: Grim104
- 2019: Das Grauen, das Grauen
- 2022: Imperium
- 2023: Ende der Nacht
- 2026: No Country For Old Grim

EPs

- 2010: Zugezogen Maskulin (Free EP with Testo as Zugezogen Maskulin)

Singles

- 2014: Alles brennt (Everything burns) (with Testo as Zugezogen Maskulin)
- 2014: Endlich wieder Krieg (Finally war again) (with Testo as Zugezogen Maskulin)
- 2019: Graf Grim
- 2022: Numb (feat. LGoony)
- 2022: Komm und Sieh
- 2022: Bam Margera
- 2022: Lächeln
- 2023: Risse
- 2023: Stadtfuchs
- 2023: Ende der Nacht

Videos

- 2009: Dis is wo ich herkomm (This is where I come from)
- 2011: Entartete Kunst (Degenerate art) (with Testo as Zugezogen Maskulin)
- 2012: Undercut Tumblrblog (with Testo as Zugezogen Maskulin)
- 2012: Ich töte Anders Breivik (I kill Anders Breivik)
- 2012: Rotkohl (Red cabbage) (with Testo as Zugezogen Maskulin)
- 2012: Maskulin Maskulin (Masculine Masculine) (with 3Plusss, Donetasy and Testo)
- 2013: Frosch (Frog)
- 2013: Crystal Meth in Brandenburg (Crystal meth in Brandenburg)
- 2014: 2. Mai (2 May)
- 2014: Alles brennt (Everything burns) (with Testo as Zugezogen Maskulin)
- 2014: Endlich wieder Krieg (Finally war again) (with Testo as Zugezogen Maskulin)
