= Herbert Ehrenberg =

German politician (1926–2018)

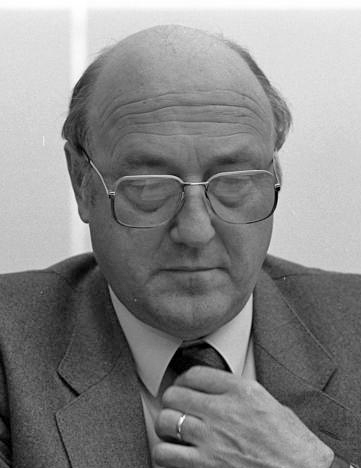
- Ehrenberg in 1981

Minister for Labour and Social Affairs
- In office 16 December 1976 – 28 April 1982
- Chancellor: Helmut Schmidt
- Preceded by: Walter Arendt
- Succeeded by: Heinz Westphal

Member of the Bundestag
- In office 13 December 1972 – 20 December 1990
- Preceded by: Johann Cramer
- Succeeded by: Gabriele Iwersen
- Constituency: Wilhelmshaven – Friesland (1972–1980); Friesland – Wilhelmshaven (1980–1990)

Personal details
- Born: 21 December 1926 Kollnischken, Germany
- Died: 20 February 2018 (aged 91) Wilhelmshaven, Germany
- Party: Social Democratic
- Education: University of Göttingen

Herbert Ehrenberg (21 December 1926 – 20 February 2018) was a German politician.

== Early life and education ==
Ehrenberg was born in Kollnischken, East Prussia (today Kolniszki, Gmina Gołdap, Poland) and visited school (Staatliche Kantschule) in Goldap until 1943, when he was conscripted to the Wehrmacht. He joined the Nazi Party on 20 April 1944. After his release as Prisoner of war in 1947 he passed his Abitur and studied national economy in Wilhelmshaven and at the University of Göttingen, where he took his doctorate in 1958.

== Political career ==
Ehrenberg joined the Public Services, Transport and Traffic Union (ÖTV) in 1949 and the Social Democratic Party of Germany, or SPD, in 1955. In 1964 he became the head of the national economy branch at the chairman of IG Bau-Steine-Erden-Union and in 1968 he started to work at the Federal Ministry of economics. In 1969 he switched to the German Chancellery and was a Secretary of State at the Federal Ministry of Labour and Social Affairs (Germany) in 1971–72 and its Minister in 1976–82.

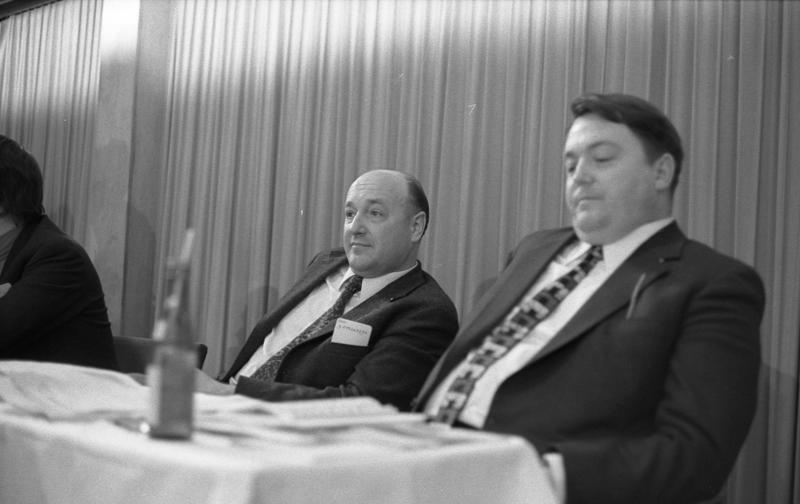
Herbert Ehrenberg (left) and Holger Börner in 1973

Ehrenberg was the vice-president of the Social Democratic Fraction in the Bundestag in 1974–1976 and a member of the Federal Executive Board of the SPD in 1975–1984. In 1997–2001 he was the Chairman of the Honorary Executive Board and in 2001–2003 the first President of the Internationaler Bund Freier Träger der Jugend-, Sozial- und Bildungsarbeit, afterwards its Honorary President. Ehrenberg died on 20 February 2018 at the age of 91.
