= Testo SE =

German manufacturer of measurement devices

Testo SE & Co. KGaA
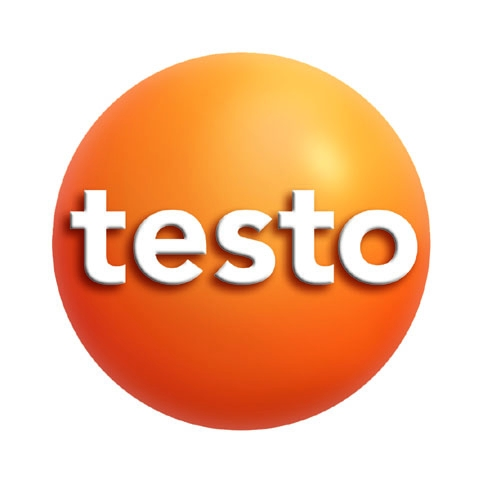
- Company type: SE & Co. KGaA
- Industry: Measurement devices
- Founded: 1957
- Headquarters: Titisee-Neustadt, Germany
- Area served: Worldwide
- Owner: Burkhard Knospe, Peter Kräuter, Eckhard Kloth

Testo SE & Co. KGaA is a company from Lenzkirch, founded in 1957, with its headquarters in Titisee-Neustadt, Germany.

The company has 35 subsidiary firms in China, Japan, Korea, USA, France, Spain, Italy, and other countries and employs around 3200 people. 1700 alone at its sites in Lenzkirch, Kirchzarten, and Titisee. The company's headquarters were moved from Lenzkirch to Titisee at the end of 2019.

Testo first made 200 million € worth of business in 2011 and had incoming orders worth 208 million €. The company invests about 10% of its annual income into research and development. In 2018, the company first gained an income of over 300 million €.

Testo is a member of the Industrial Companies Trading Association Baden.

== History ==
=== Legal Development ===
The company Testo SE & Co. KGaA, as it exists today, was founded as Department of Thermometer Development in a branch factory of the Atmos Fritsching & Co. GmbH Viernheim in Lenzkirch in 1957 („Chem.-Pharm. Präparate und Medizinisch-Technische Apparate“). The company specialised in the medical sector, producing pharmaceuticals and medical-technical apparatus, with roots in the Kaiser-Friedricks-Apotheke, establishing in Berlin in 1888. The company produced suction pumps and pharmaceuticals for medical use.

Paul Fritzsching, then Managing Director of Boehringer & Söhne in Mannheim, acquired an interest in Atmos Fritzsching & Co. in the 1930s due to his interest in the company's innovations in medical technology. After relocating the brand and operations to Mannheim, the company moved to Freiburg im Breisgau in 1938, where it manufactured compressors for technical and medical applications. When the Freiburg plant was destroyed during an air raid in 1944, the company again relocated, to Lenzkirch in the Black Forest.

In 1957, Hans Bauer, founder of the thermometer construction department, developed an electronic clinical thermometer with an analogue display for measuring fever. The device's measuring range was expanded to measure temperatures outside the range of body temperature, leading to its use for industrial and research purposes. As the product line continued to evolve away from medical uses, on 1 April 1981, the Electronic Measuring Devices department was spun off into a new entity named Testoterm KG Fritzsching, based in Viernheim, with its Lenzkirch plant continuing to grow in the field of industrial measurement technology.

In 1984, the Atmos Fritzsching & Co. GmbH Betrieb Elektronischer Messgeräte was restructured into Testoterm Messtechnik GmbH & Co. KG, which, from that point on, was responsible for development and production. The sales arm continued working under Testoterm Fritzsching GmbH & Co. KG. The two companies merged into Testoterm Fritzsching GmbH & Co. on 1 January 1993. The new CEOs were Gerd Knospe, Wolfgang Hessler, and Peter Greiser. As the product range had expanded beyond temperature management the company rebranded to Testo GmbH & Co. KG in July 1993.

In 1999, Testo acquired 75% of the Atmos Medizin Technik GmbH & Co. KG, which was its former parent company. It also spun off its service division, Testo Industrial Services. On 1 January 2002, Testo GmbH & Co. became Testo AG, though the company remained privately held and was not listed on the stock exchange. In 2005, the managing directors of Atmos bought out Testo shares.

On 1 July 2010, Testo acquired Matter Engineering AG in Wohlen, Switzerland, which specialised in dust management devices. The subsidiary, Matter Aerosol AG, was later integrated into Testo.

In January 2011, Testo Sensor GmbH was established. Focusing on the development, production, and sale of temperature sensors and thermometers implanted into heating systems and solar equipment, in coffee machines and air-conditioning in cars, among others areas. That same year, Testo AG offered their extended management 5% of its shares. This parcel of shares was then signed over.

In the summer of 2016, the company's legal form changed from Testo AG to Testo SE & Co. KGaA.

The construction of a second office building in Titisee started in March 2017. This structure was completed and occupied in 2019.

=== History of Headquarters ===
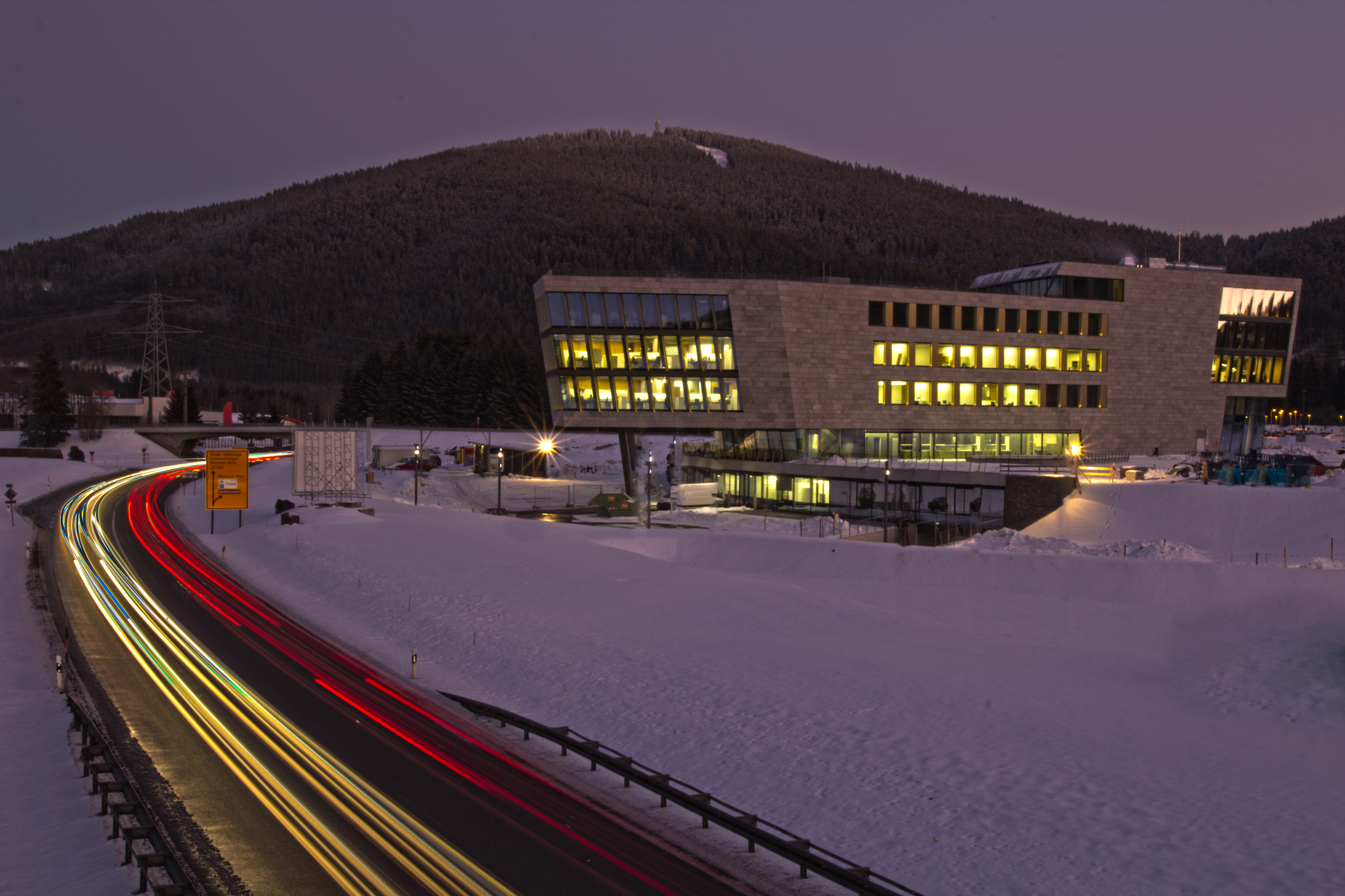
Testo headquarters in Titisee-Neustadt

Atmos' department of thermometer development was first located on the top floor of the former school in Unterlenzkirch. The company moved into a villa formerly owned by the clock factory of Lenzkirch. Connected to this building directly, on the area of the old train station of Lenzkirch, new production plants and buildings for administration were constructed in 1971, 1975, 1978, 1982, 1990, 2001, and 2007, creating space for about 800 employees. This number of employees exceeded whatever space there was left in Lenzkirch, which is why Testo started building the first of four Buildings in Titisee in early 2010. Since the beginning of 2012, 250 people are working there. The second phase of construction was planned for 2017/2018, so that the location in Titisee could offer space for up to 1200 employees. When Testo finished the construction of the second building, the company moved its headquarters to Titisee but the location in Lenzkirch still remaines.

== Products ==
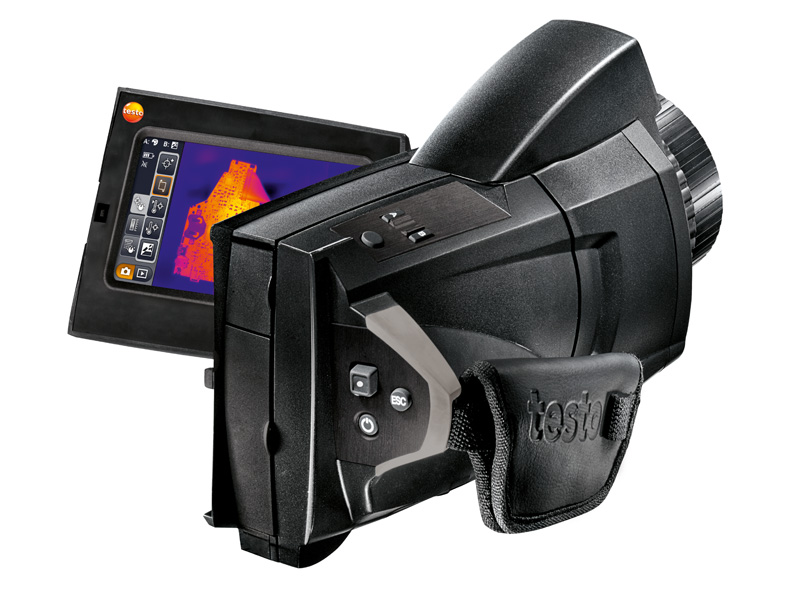
Thermographic camera produced by Testo

The company offers measuring devices for refrigeration-, air-conditioning-, and environmental technology, for emission- and flue gas analysis, as well as for measuring interior air- and food quality. The most innovative products are a measuring device for fine dust, a measuring device for frier oil, thermographic cameras, a cloud-based monitoring system for measured data, measuring solutions like the HACCP management system and devices which can be controlled via smartphone, like the Smart Probes.

== Controversies ==
In March 2016, the union IG Metall accused Testo of preventing the foundation of an employee representative committee for several years. All initiatives by the employees and the union were torpedoed by the management, which said that a secret vote had shown that the employees were not interested in having a representative committee. Management was accused of secretly pressuring employees and preventing the union from effectively informing them. Management started to advertise a different system, a professional staff committee, instead.

In early 2017, a case of fraud within the company was made public. A longtime employee was accused of embezzlement of 1.5 million € between 2008 and 2015 by exploiting the company's voucher system. Testo pressed charges against her.

== Awards ==
Testo has received numerous awards and recognitions for its innovation and leadership in various fields.

In 2007, it was honored as a selected location of the "Germany - Land of Ideas" initiative (de:"Deutschland - Land der Ideen"). Two years later, in 2009, Testo was recognized with the TOP 100 seal of approval, ranking it among Germany's most innovative companies. It also received recognition from the "Sachen Machen" initiative of the Association of German Engineers. In 2010, Testo was awarded the Axia Award by Deloitte in the category "With the customer into the future - from customer idea to innovation.

Testo has also been listed among the "Top 100 Most Innovative Companies" in 2012 and named one of the top 100 best German SMEs by Wirtschaftswoche magazine in 2013. In 2014, the Munich Strategy Group recognized Testo as one of the "50 Innovation Champions of German SMEs." The company's testo 870 thermal imaging "testo 870" thermographic camera won the German Design Award 2016 in the "Workshop & Tools" category, and in the same year, Testo was named Innovator of the Year by brand eins Wissen and Statista.

In 2018, Testo once again received the TOP 100 seal of approval, and between 2019 and 2021, it secured the "Fair Company" award. Testo qualified for the "Kununu Top Company" award in 2022, and Focus-Business selected it as one of the "Top National Employers 2022." Most recently, in 2023, Testo was included in the list of 500 world market leaders compiled by the University of St. Gallen.
