= Wilhelm Kunst (actor) =

German actor (1799–1859)

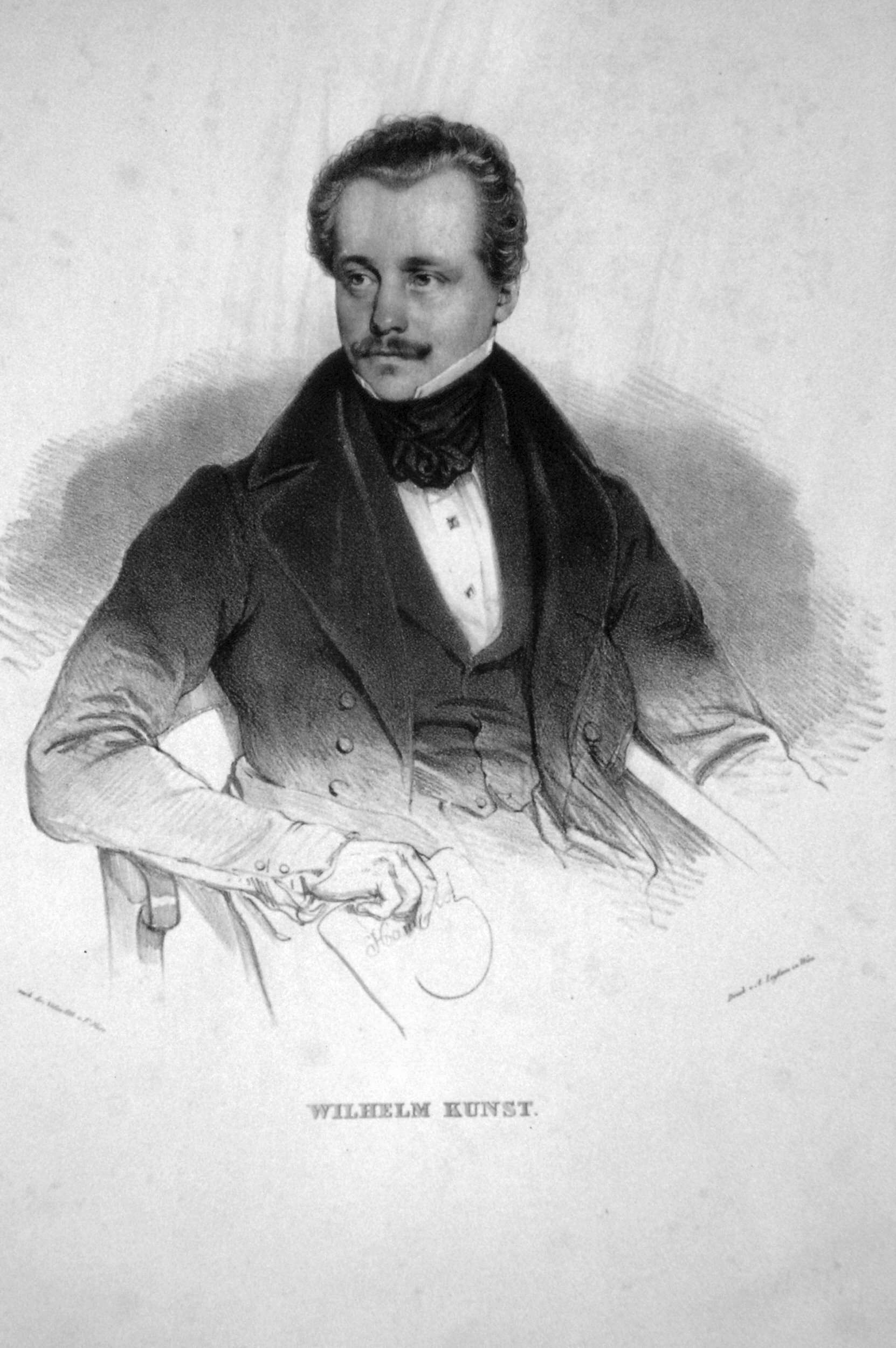
- Wilhelm Kunst ca. 1850, lithograph by Faustin Herr
- Born: 2 February 1799; Free City of Hamburg, Holy Roman Empire
- Died: 17 November 1859 (aged 60); Vienna, Austrian Empire
- Occupation: Actor

Wilhelm Kunst (2 February 1799 in Hamburg – 16 or 17 November 1859 in Vienna) was a German actor. He provoked varied reactions. He played heroic roles, roles that required subtlety and excellence in acting produced varied reactions. He did better in lower-rated versions of a particular plot, for example lesser translations of Shakespeare. He first played major roles in Lübeck and worked his way up to the Viennese stage. During his heyday, he did well economically, but ended his career in poverty. In 1825, he married actress Sophie Schröder.

== Sources ==
- Joseph Kürschner (1883). "Kunst, Wilhelm" . Allgemeine Deutsche Biographie (in German). Vol. 17. Leipzig: Duncker & Humblot. pp. 389–390.
- Shurz, Carl (1852), Lebenserinnerungen bis zum Jahre (in German), Berlin: Georg Reimer
