= Testo (rapper) =

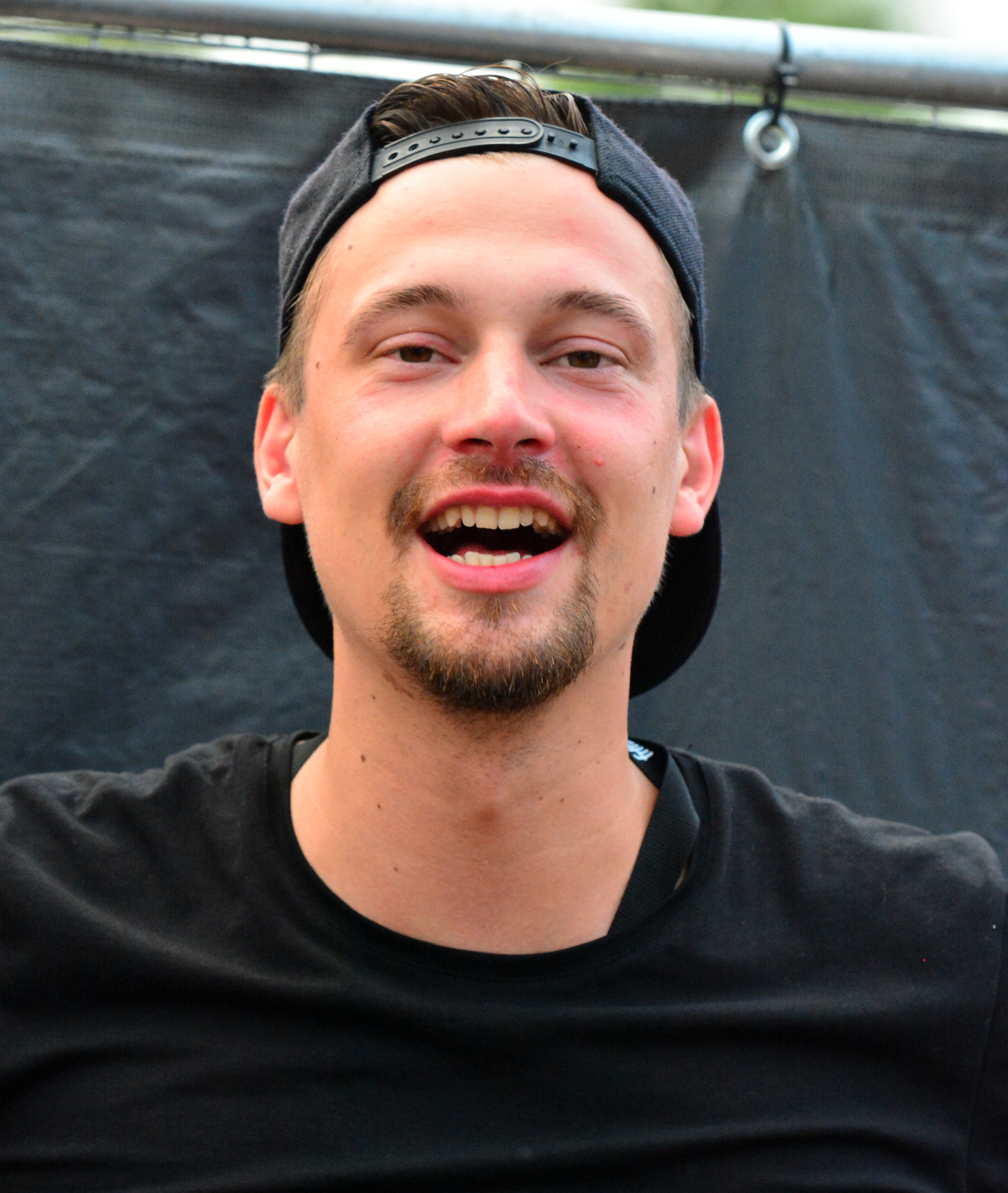
- Testo at Ackerfestival 2014

Background information
- Born: Hendrik Bolz; 1988 (age 37–38); Leipzig, Saxony, Germany
- Genres: German hip hop, Rap
- Occupation: Rapper
- Years active: 2010–present
- Label: Buback

Hendrik Bolz (born 1988 in Leipzig, Saxony), better known by his stage name Testo, is a German rapper and writer who is signed to the Hamburg label Buback. Together with the rapper grim104 he forms the hip-hop duo Zugezogen Maskulin.Testo announced his retirement in 2024. He wrote music for the play Krieg and Frieden for the Theater Magdeburg in 2025.

== Biography ==
Testo was born in Leipzig in 1988 and spent his youth mostly in Stralsund (Mecklenburg-Vorpommern). After graduation, he moved to Berlin, where he did an internship in the editorial office of the website rap.de, under the journalist Marcus Staiger. It was here that he met grim104, with whom he formed the hip-hop duo Zugezogen Maskulin. The first album was released in 2011, and the second in 2015. Besides his work with Zugezogen Maskulin, Testo has also made his own solo EP in 2013, entitled Töte deine Helden (Kill Your Heroes). He published an autobiographical novel in 2022.

== Discography ==
Albums

- 2011: Kauft nicht bei Zugezogenen! (Don't buy from newcomers!) (Free album with grim104 as Zugezogen Maskulin)
- 2015: Alles brennt (Everything burns) (with grim104 as Zugezogen Maskulin)

EPs

- 2010: Zugezogen Maskulin (Free EP with grim104 as Zugezogen Maskulin)
- 2013: Töte deine Helden (Kill Your Heroes)

Singles

- 2014: Alles brennt (Everything burns) (with grim104 as Zugezogen Maskulin)
- 2014: Endlich wieder Krieg (Finally war again) (with grim104 as Zugezogen Maskulin)
- 2015: Plattenbau O.S.T. (Plattenbau O.S.T.) (with Ada Steinberg as Zugezogen Maskulin)

Videos

- 2011: Entartete Kunst (Degenerate art) (with grim104 as Zugezogen Maskulin)
- 2012: Undercut Tumblrblog (with grim104 as Zugezogen Maskulin)
- 2012: Rotkohl (Red cabbage) (with grim104 as Zugezogen Maskulin)
- 2012: Maskulin Maskulin (Masculine Masculine) (with 3Plusss, Donetasy and grim104)
- 2013: Champagner Für Alle (Champagne For Everyone)
- 2013: Töte deine Helden (Kill Your Heroes)
- 2013: Keine Ahnung Wo (No Idea Where)
- 2014: Alles brennt (Everything burns) (with grim104 as Zugezogen Maskulin)
- 2014: Endlich wieder Krieg (Finally war again) (with grim104 as Zugezogen Maskulin)
- 2015: Plattenbau O.S.T. (Plattenbau O.S.T.) (with Ada Steinberg as Zugezogen Maskulin)

== Publications ==
Books

- Hendrik Bolz: Nullerjahre. Jugend in blühenden Landschaften, Kiepenheuer & Witsch, 2022, ISBN 978-3-462-00094-8
