= Johann Cramer (politician) =

German politician (1905–1987)

Member of the Bundestag; from Lower Saxony
- In office 15 October 1957 – 13 December 1972
- Preceded by: Hellmuth Heye
- Succeeded by: Herbert Ehrenberg
- Constituency: Wilhelmshaven – Friesland (1961–1965); State list (1965–1969); Wilhelmshaven – Friesland (1969–1972)
- In office 7 September 1949 – 6 October 1953
- Preceded by: Constituency established
- Succeeded by: Hellmuth Heye
- Constituency: Wilhelmshaven – Friesland

Personal details
- Born: Johann Friedrich Cramer; 29 July 1905 Norden, Lower Saxony, Germany
- Died: 14 January 1987 (aged 81) Wilhelmshaven, West Germany
- Party: Social Democratic
- Spouse(s): Gerhardine Meiners (m. 1927; died 1975) Anna Sonntag (m. 1978)
- Children: 2

Johann Cramer (29 July 1905 – 14 January 1987) was a German politician of the Social Democratic Party (SPD) and former member of the German Bundestag.

== Political career ==
Cramer became a member of the Bundestag in 1949 as a directly elected member of parliament in the Wilhelmshaven - Friesland constituency, and was chairman of the Bundestag committee for postal and telecommunications services during this legislative period. He was again a member of the Bundestag from 1957 to 1972. He was able to win his constituency directly in 1961 and 1969; in the other legislative periods, he entered parliament via his party's Lower Saxony state list.

== Literature ==
Herbst, Ludolf; Jahn, Bruno (2002). Vierhaus, Rudolf (ed.). Biographisches Handbuch der Mitglieder des Deutschen Bundestages. 1949–2002 [Biographical Handbook of the Members of the German Bundestag. 1949–2002] (in German). München: De Gruyter - De Gruyter Saur. p. 1715. ISBN 978-3-11-184511-1.
