= Zugezogen Maskulin =

German Hip-Hop Duo from Berlin

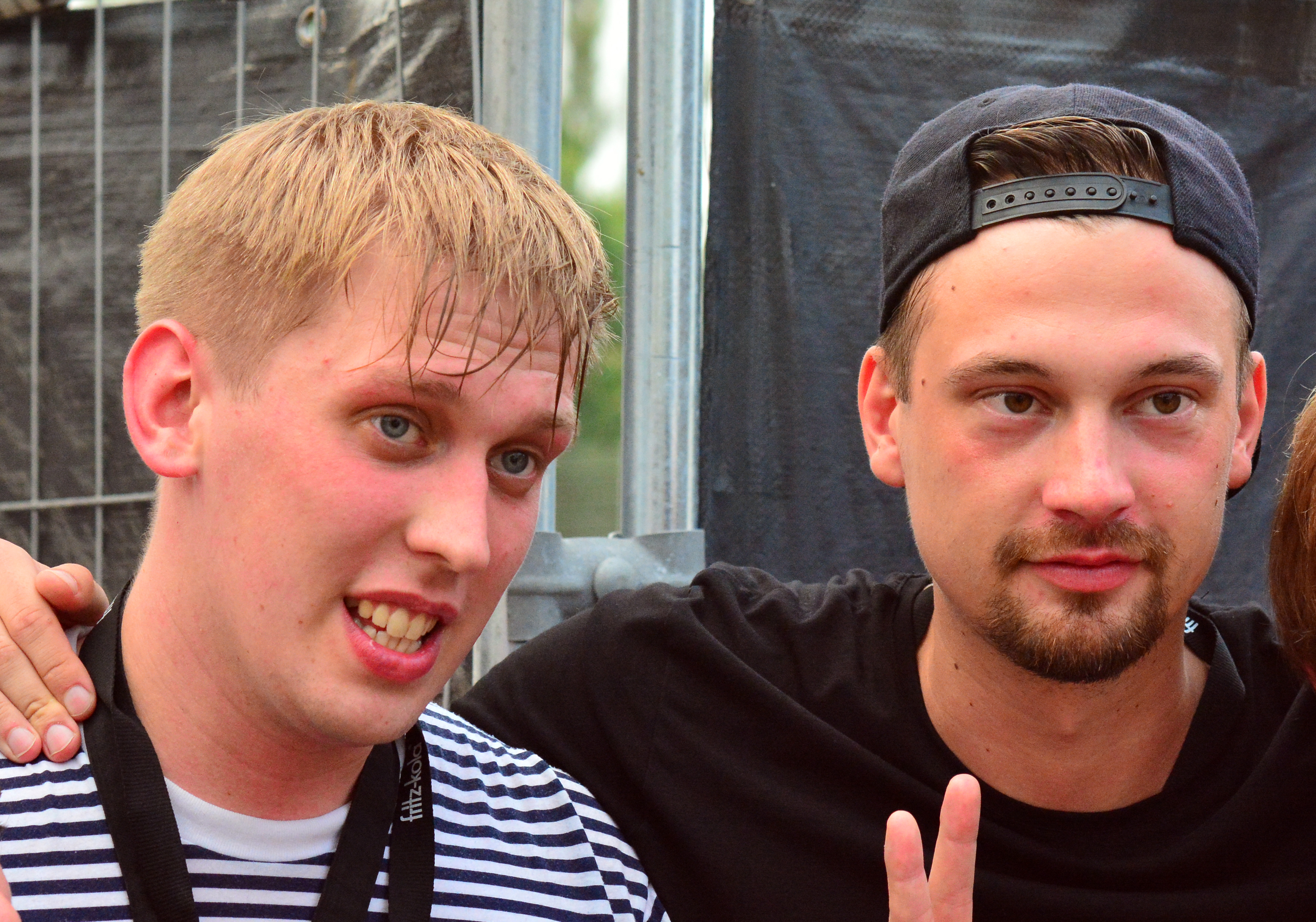
- Zugezogen Maskulin at the Ackerfestival 2014

Background information
- Origin: Berlin, Germany
- Genres: German hip hop, Rap
- Years active: 2010–present
- Labels: Buback
- Members: grim104 Testo

Zugezogen Maskulin is a German rap duo, formed by grim104 and Testo in Berlin. They are signed to the Hamburg label Buback.

Zugezogen means 'newcomers' and the name is a reference to the fact that both members of the group are newcomers to Berlin, as well as being an homage to previous German rap duos 'Westberlin Maskulin' and 'Südberlin Maskulin'.

== History ==
Grim104 and Testo formed the duo in July 2010. In 2011, the free album Kauft nicht bei Zugezogenen! (lit.: Do not buy from newcomers!) was released. The duo present themselves, like K.I.Z, as a satire of gangster rap and machoism. Many of their lyrics are sarcastic and exaggeratedly macho. In the fall of 2013, the duo were signed by the Hamburg Independent label Buback. Buback also released grim104's self titled solo EP in November 2013. On 13 February 2015, the group's second album was released, Alles brennt (Everything Burns).

== Discography ==
EPs

- 2010: Zugezogen Maskulin

Albums

- 2011: Kauft nicht bei Zugezogenen! (Don't buy from Newcomers!)
- 2015: Alles brennt (Everything Burns)
- 2017: Alle gegen alle (Everybody Against Everybody)
- 2020: 10 Jahre Abfuck

Singles

- 2014: Alles brennt (Everything burns)
- 2014: Endlich wieder Krieg (Finally war again)
- 2015: Plattenbau O.S.T
- 2016: Ratatat im Bataclan
- 2017: Was für eine Zeit
- 2017: Uwe & Heiko
- 2018: Junge Roemer
- 2019: 36 Grad (feat. Carsten Chemnitz & Nura)
- 2020: Exit
- 2020: Tanz auf dem Vulkan
- 2020: Sommer Vorbei
- 2020: Weihnachtssong

Videos

- 2011: Entartete Kunst (Degenerate art)
- 2012: Undercut Tumblrblog
- 2012: Rotkohl (Red cabbage)
- 2014: Alles brennt (Everything burns)
- 2014: Endlich wieder Krieg (Finally war again)
- 2015: Plattenbau O.S.T
- 2017: Was für eine Zeit
- 2017: Uwe & Heiko
- 2017: Alle gegen Alle
- 2020: Der Müde Tod
- 2020: Exit
- 2020: Tanz auf dem Vulkan
- 2020: Sommer Vorbei
