= Wilhelm Kunst (sculptor) =

German sculptor (1909–1986)

- Wilhelm Kunst at a Madonna
- Born: August 8, 1909; Zetel, Oldenburg
- Died: January 13, 1986 (aged 76); Zetel, Oldenburg
- Occupation: Sculptor

Wilhelm Kunst (8 August 1909 – 13 January 1986) was a German wood sculptor.

== Living and working ==
Wilhelm Kunst was born in Zetel / Oldenburg, the first of three children to the smith Wilhelm Kunst and Meta Paradies. He felt his tendency to art and the material wood already in younger days. Between 1924 and 1928 he was apprenticed as wood sculptor to the company Wessels & Thorbeck in the village of Neuenburg (Oldenburg), a well-known centre of cabinet makers and wood carvers already for centuries. After successfully passing his exam he stayed one year more in Neuenburg as assistant in the workshop Wissmann in order to gain more experience. While he was predominantly engaged with carving furniture or other flat decoration until that time, he increasingly felt uncomfortable with this type of carving and now desired for learning how to create sculptures.

For achieving this aim he attended the school for wood sculptors of Bad Warmbrunn in Silesia (today Ciepliece/Poland) from 1931 to 1935. Bad Warmbrunn was not only famous for its healing spa at the foot of the high mountain range „Riesengebirge“ but also for the training school which enjoyed an excellent international reputation. Professor Cirillo dell’Antonio, an Italian artist who had his origin in Val Gardena was teacher and director during the four years’ stay of Wilhelm Kunst at this school. He possessed a keen sense of bringing the abilities of an individual student to light and to educate him in an understanding but consequent manner. From him Wilhelm Kunst gained substantial knowledge of human and animal anatomy and proportion. Returned from Silesia, Kunst installed a studio in his parents’ house in Zetel to work as a self-employed wood sculptor, and in the same year he passed his examination for the grade of master.

The Second World War took him to Africa where he was wounded in 1942. He got back to his homeland for recovery to the company at Quarmbeck (Quedlinburg), where he met his later wife from Gernrode. Since jobs were short those days, he temporarily was employed for various jobs. But for one year he even worked as sculptor at a cabinetmaker's before he returned home to Zetel with his wife and first child. The atelier in his parents’ house was waiting to be filled with activity.

The economic situation in 1946 however was bad for everyone and even worse for artist, because nobody spent his money for art. So, the young family often struggled with poverty. But at that time a co-operation was initiated with his cousin, the wood turner Johann Kunst who ran a workshop in Neuenburg, a village close to Zetel. He had already been designing decorative arts of turned wood in 1931. In order to overcome the post war economic situation the two cousins, Wilhelm and Johann Kunst commonly developed a product line now furnished with biblical proverbs or motives of different kind carved in plates, cutting boards or bookends, etc. When Günther Kunst, like his father master of wood turner, entered the family company, he also appreciated the outstanding carving skills of Wilhelm Kunst. A fruitful teamwork created many further objects which were sold throughout Germany and abroad. The successful co-operation was terminated by the death of the two competent craftsmen (Johann Kunst 1985, Wilhelm Kunst 1986).

Furthermore, orders were placed by the church communities. It is of note that the St. Martins church of Zetel, his place of birth, commissioned him for a remarkable number of pieces for the event of an interior renovation in 1951. He created Moses who was bearing the pulpit decorated with the four evangelists. Further he worked the Last Supper beneath the winged altar.

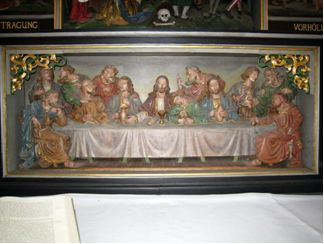
Last supper

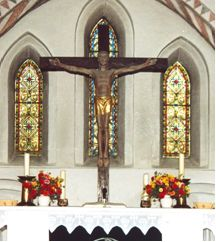
Crucifix

Works of various types have been realized throughout the county of Oldenburg (crucifix, Madonna, holy figures, altar restoration, ornamental organ casing, roll of honour). A constant co-operation with the organ builder Alfred Führer in Wilhelmshaven provided Wilhelm Kunst several orders on extensive organ decoration.

gallery Roselius-house

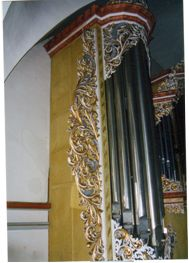
organ decoration

One of the most significant works in public domain however can be considered the gallery and staircase in the entrance of the historical Roselius-house in the Böttcher Street of Bremen. The original baroque installation was destroyed during the war in 1944 and was carved as replication by Wilhelm Kunst between October 1953 and March 1954.

More and more people of his homeland got interested in his art. Characters of the country life or several professions were famous objects. But also Christmas cradles, sport awards or gifts of commemoration were often requested.

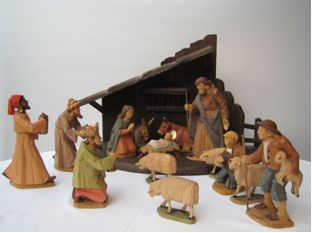
Weihnachtskrippe

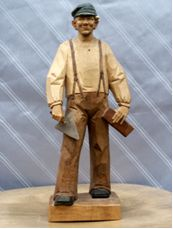
Maurer

Wilhelm Kunst was a natural artist with his individual style of technical precision and particular expressiveness of his works. The material he worked with was oak and lime wood from the nature in his neighbourhood, processed by far more than 100 various knives.

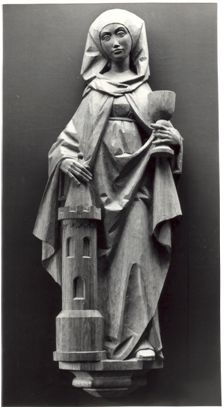
Holy Barbara

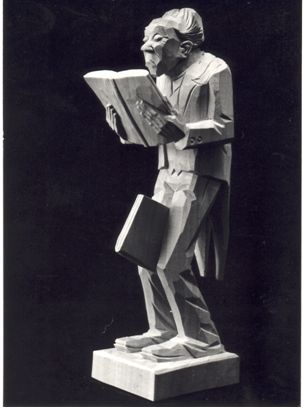
Bücherwurm

In the early seventies he joined the „Bildhauerkreis Ernst Rülke“, a reunion of former sculptors from East Germany and Silesia who were all students of Bad Warmbrunn. Elsbeth Siebenbürger, one of the students trained by the last teacher and director under German administration – Ernst Rülke - brought this circle to light and organised regular expositions and symposia, Kunst took part in.

Wilhelm Kunst was permanent active until the end of his life. On January 13, 1986 he died from the consequences of a stroke and was buried on the new cemetery at Zetel.

== Memberships ==
- Roll of chamber of crafts at Oldenburg 1935–1986
- Substitute observer for master exams at the chamber of crafts at Hannover 1968–1984
- Circle of sculptors Ernst Rülke at Esslingen

== Expositions ==
- Circle of sculptors Ernst Rülke, Symposium Festenburg/Harz 1970
- Circle of sculptors Ernst Rülke, Ostdeutsche Galerie Regensburg 1973
- Circle of sculptors Ernst Rülke, Mainz 1979
- Circle of sculptors Ernst Rülke, Symposium Wunsiedel 1984
- Exposition Wilhelm Kunst, history workshop Zetel, 2002
- Centennial exposition/retrospective, Zetel April–October 2009

== Publicly accessible works ==
- St. Martins-church Zetel:
  - - Last Supper (Predella), Moses, 4 Evangelists, 1951
  - - Christmas cradle 1980
- Guide post to swimming baths at Zetel
- St. Johannes Markhausen, reliefs lecterns
- St. Nicolai-church Schmalförden, crucifix, 1952
- Gethsemane-church Bakum, crucifix
- Church of Neustadtgödens, roll of honour, 1952
- St. Martins-church Tettens, crucifix, 1952
- Ev. luth. Christus-church Borkum, roll of honour, 1953
- Roselius-house Böttcher Street Bremen, gallery & stair, 1953/1954
- St. Laurentius-church Langwarden, roll of honour, 1954
- Church of Filsum, roll of honour, 1956
- Christus-church Brake-Nord, Christmas cradle, 1956
- St. Johannes-church Wiefelstede, John the Baptist, 1957
- St. Ansgari-church Bremen, organ decoration, 1957, 1960
- St. Ansgar-church Bassum, statue of Mary, 1959
- Christus-church Oldenbrok, altar-restoration, 1960–1961
- St. Matthäus-church Osnabrück, Christmas cradle, 1963/1964
- St. Andreas-church Cloppenburg, organ decoration, 1965
- Basilica of Lipari/Italy, St. Francis, 1966
- Freie evangelische Kirche Hesel/Leer, crucifix, 1977
- St. Margaretha-church Emstek, Christmas angel
- Christophorus-house Brake, Holy Christophorus, 1978
- St. Trinitatis-church (independ. ev. luth. church)Oldenburg, crucifix 1978
- Hafenschule Varel, relief „fishermen“ 1975
- K+S AG Salzdetfurth, Sta. Barbara, 1979
