= Astrid Klug =

German politician (born 1968)

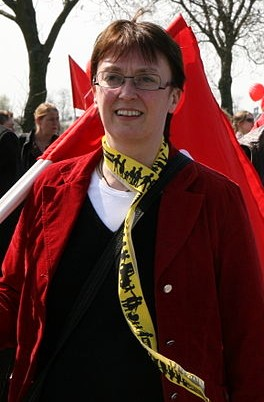
Astrid Klug at a demonstration in Elmshorn (2010)

Astrid Klug (born 4 February 1968 in Homburg, Saarland) is a German Social Democratic Party (SPD) politician. She was executive director of the SPD from 2009 to 2012, and was a member of the Bundestag from 2002 to 2009, and in 2013.
