= German submarine U-468 =

German World War II submarine

History

Nazi Germany
- Name: U-468
- Ordered: 15 August 1940
- Builder: Deutsche Werke, Kiel
- Yard number: 299
- Laid down: 1 July 1941
- Launched: 16 May 1942
- Commissioned: 12 August 1942
- Fate: Sunk on 11 August 1943

General characteristics
- Class & type: Type VIIC submarine
- Displacement: 769 tonnes (757 long tons) surfaced; 871 t (857 long tons) submerged
- Length: 67.10 m (220 ft 2 in) o/a; 50.50 m (165 ft 8 in) pressure hull
- Beam: 6.20 m (20 ft 4 in) o/a; 4.70 m (15 ft 5 in) pressure hull
- Height: 9.60 m (31 ft 6 in)
- Draught: 4.74 m (15 ft 7 in)
- Installed power: 2,800–3,200 PS (2,100–2,400 kW; 2,800–3,200 bhp) (diesels); 750 PS (550 kW; 740 shp) (electric)
- Propulsion: 2 shafts; 2 × diesel engines; 2 × electric motors.
- Speed: 17.7 knots (32.8 km/h; 20.4 mph) surfaced; 7.6 knots (14.1 km/h; 8.7 mph) submerged
- Range: 8,500 nmi (15,700 km; 9,800 mi) at 10 knots (19 km/h; 12 mph) surfaced; 80 nmi (150 km; 92 mi) at 4 knots (7.4 km/h; 4.6 mph) submerged
- Test depth: 230 m (750 ft); Crush depth: 250–295 m (820–968 ft)
- Complement: 4 officers, 40–56 enlisted
- Armament: 5 × 53.3 cm (21 in) torpedo tubes (four bow, one stern); 14 × torpedoes or 26 TMA mines; 1 × 8.8 cm (3.46 in) deck gun (220 rounds); 1 × twin 2 cm (0.79 in) C/30 anti-aircraft gun

Service record
- Part of: 5th U-boat Flotilla; 12 August 1942 – 31 January 1943; 3rd U-boat Flotilla; 1 February – 11 August 1943
- Identification codes: M 49 533
- Commanders: Oblt.z.S. Klemens Schamong; 12 August 1942 – 11 August 1943
- Operations: 3 patrols: 1st patrol: 1 February – 27 March 1943; 2nd patrol: 19 April – 29 May 1943; 3rd patrol: 7 July – 11 August 1943
- Victories: 1 merchant ship sunk (6,537 GRT)

German submarine U-468 was a Type VIIC U-boat of Nazi Germany's Kriegsmarine during World War II. The submarine was laid down on 1 July 1941 as yard number 299 at the Deutsche Werke yard in Kiel, launched on 16 May 1942 and commissioned on 12 August 1942 under the command of Oberleutnant zur See Klemens Schamong. She sailed on three war patrols and sank only one ship before being sunk by a RNZAF plane on 11 August 1943. The airplane pilot (who died in the action, along with his crew and most of the submariners) was subsequently awarded the Victoria Cross – one of only three occasions on which a VC has been awarded solely on the testimony of an enemy combatant in WW2.

== Design ==
German Type VIIC submarines were preceded by the shorter Type VIIB submarines. U-468 had a displacement of 769 tonnes (757 long tons) when at the surface and 871 tonnes (857 long tons) while submerged. She had a total length of 67.10 m (220 ft 2 in), a pressure hull length of 50.50 m (165 ft 8 in), a beam of 6.20 m (20 ft 4 in), a height of 9.60 m (31 ft 6 in), and a draught of 4.74 m (15 ft 7 in). The submarine was powered by two Germaniawerft F46 four-stroke, six-cylinder supercharged diesel engines producing a total of 2,800 to 3,200 metric horsepower (2,060 to 2,350 kW; 2,760 to 3,160 shp) for use while surfaced, two Siemens-Schuckert GU 343/38–8 double-acting electric motors producing a total of 750 metric horsepower (550 kW; 740 shp) for use while submerged. She had two shafts and two 1.23 m (4 ft) propellers. The boat was capable of operating at depths of up to 230 metres (750 ft).

The submarine had a maximum surface speed of 17.7 knots (32.8 km/h; 20.4 mph) and a maximum submerged speed of 7.6 knots (14.1 km/h; 8.7 mph). When submerged, the boat could operate for 80 nautical miles (150 km; 92 mi) at 4 knots (7.4 km/h; 4.6 mph); when surfaced, she could travel 8,500 nautical miles (15,700 km; 9,800 mi) at 10 knots (19 km/h; 12 mph). U-468 was fitted with five 53.3 cm (21 in) torpedo tubes (four fitted at the bow and one at the stern), fourteen torpedoes, one 8.8 cm (3.46 in) SK C/35 naval gun, 220 rounds, and one twin 2 cm (0.79 in) C/30 anti-aircraft gun. The boat had a complement of between forty-four and sixty.

== Service history ==
The boat began her service career by training with the 5th U-boat Flotilla, before moving on to the 3rd flotilla for operations.

=== First patrol ===
U-468 sailed for the first time from Kiel on 28 January 1943, stopping briefly at Kristiansand in Norway, before heading out into the mid-Atlantic. On 12 March, U-468 sank the British 6,537 GRT tanker Empire Light southeast of Cape Farewell (Greenland) with two torpedoes. The tanker, a straggler from Convoy ON 168, had been damaged by a torpedo from U-638 on 7 March, and abandoned by her surviving crew. The U-boat arrived at her new home port of La Pallice in occupied France on 27 March.

=== Second patrol ===
U-468 departed La Pallice for the mid-Atlantic on 19 April 1943, but had no successes. At 08:35 on 22 May the U-boat came under attack by a Grumman TBF Avenger torpedo bomber of Squadron VC-9 flying from the escort carrier USS Bogue. Barely an hour later another aircraft from the same squadron attacked and the U-boat was damaged. At 15:57, U-468 was attacked for a third time by an aircraft of the Royal Navy's 819 Naval Air Squadron. The boat defended itself with flak without destroying the aircraft. U-468 had suffered serious damage and was forced to abandon her patrol, returning to base on 29 May.

=== Third patrol and loss ===
The U-boat sailed for her third and final war patrol on 7 July 1943 from La Pallice. She headed south to the West African coast. There on 11 August, she was attacked and sunk by a B-24 Liberator from 200 Squadron RAF, south-west of Dakar in position 12°20′N 20°07′W. The U-boat's anti-aircraft fire hit the aircraft several times and set it on fire, but the Liberator continued to turn into its attack and dropped six depth charges before crashing into the sea, killing all eight crewmen aboard. Two depth charges fell very close to the U-boat with devastating effect. U-468 sank within 10 minutes, and only the commander and six crewmen managed to haul themselves into a rubber dinghy that floated free from the aircraft wreck, and were picked up by the corvette HMS Clarkia on 13 August.

The pilot of the Liberator, Flying Officer Lloyd Allan Trigg RNZAF was subsequently awarded the Victoria Cross for this action. This is one of the only three occasions such a decoration has been awarded solely on the testimony of an enemy combatant – the others being Lieutenant Commander Gerard Roope of HMS Glowworm (H92) (recommended by Kapitän zur See (captain) Hellmuth Heye of the German cruiser Admiral Hipper) and Sergeant Thomas Frank Durrant of No. 1 Commando during St Nazaire Raid (on recommendation of Kapitänleutnant F. K. Paul of the German torpedo boat (small destroyer) Jaguar. It was the first to be awarded to ASW (anti-submarine-warfare) aircrew.

=== Wolfpacks ===
U-468 took part in nine wolfpacks, namely:

- Ritter (11 – 26 February 1943)
- Burggraf (4 – 5 March 1943)
- Raubgraf (7 – 16 March 1943)
- Amsel (29 April – 3 May 1943)
- Amsel 3 (3 – 6 May 1943)
- Rhein (7 – 10 May 1943)
- Elbe 1 (10 – 14 May 1943)
- Mosel (19 – 23 May 1943)
- Without name (11 – 29 July 1943)

== Summary of raiding history ==
Date	Ship Name	Nationality	Tonnage (GRT)	Fate
12 March 1943	Empire Light	United Kingdom	6,537	Sunk

== Bibliography ==
- Busch, Rainer; Röll, Hans-Joachim (1999). German U-boat commanders of World War II : a biographical dictionary. Translated by Brooks, Geoffrey. London, Annapolis, Md: Greenhill Books, Naval Institute Press. ISBN 1-55750-186-6.
- Busch, Rainer; Röll, Hans-Joachim (1999). Deutsche U-Boot-Verluste von September 1939 bis Mai 1945 [German U-boat losses from September 1939 to May 1945]. Der U-Boot-Krieg (in German). Vol. IV. Hamburg, Berlin, Bonn: Mittler. ISBN 3-8132-0514-2.
- Gröner, Erich; Jung, Dieter; Maass, Martin (1991). U-boats and Mine Warfare Vessels. German Warships 1815–1945. Vol. 2. Translated by Thomas, Keith; Magowan, Rachel. London: Conway Maritime Press. ISBN 0-85177-593-4.
- Kemp, Paul (1999). U-Boats Destroyed – German Submarine Losses in the World Wars. London: Arms & Armour. ISBN 1-85409-515-3.
