= No. 200 Squadron RAF =

Defunct flying squadron of the Royal Air Force

- No. 200 Squadron badge
- Active: July 1917 – 13 June 1919; May 1941 – April 1945
- Country: United Kingdom
- Branch: Royal Air Force
- Mottos: Latin: In loco parentis "We act as guardians"
- Equipment: Lockheed Hudson; Consolidated Liberator

Insignia
- Squadron Badge heraldry: In front of a fountain, a Pegasus.

No. 200 Squadron of the Royal Air Force operated during the First and Second World War. The squadron was first formed in mid-1917 and during the First World War, it undertook a training role, before being disbanded in mid-1919. It was re-formed in 1941, and operated maritime patrol aircraft firstly from the United Kingdom, and then west Africa until early 1944 when it moved to India. In April 1945, the squadron was disbanded, having been renumbered No. 8 Squadron RAF.

== First World War ==
No. 200 Training Squadron Royal Flying Corps was formed at East Retford on 17 June 1917, it operated the Royal Aircraft Factory F.E.2 in the night flying training role. It was disbanded on 13 June 1919 at the end of the war.

== Second World War ==
The squadron was formed on 25 May 1941 from a section of No. 206 Squadron RAF at RAF Bircham Newton in Norfolk, the first Lockheed Hudson IV patrol bombers for the squadron arrived at the beginning of June. Later in the month the squadron deployed to RAF Gibraltar and then to the Gambia, where it flew convoy protection missions out of RAF Jeswang, moving to RAF Yundum in 1943 and re-equipping with the four-engined Consolidated Liberator V bombers.

Detachments of the squadron also flew from several other West African airfields in this period.

In March 1944, the squadron redeployed to Madras in India as part of South East Asia Command. It only carried out a few missions from Madras before moving to Bengal for special duties, mainly supplying and delivering guerrilla parties into Burma and Malaya. In April 1945 it was renumbered as No. 8 Squadron RAF and 200 Squadron was disbanded.

== Victoria Cross ==
In August 1943, Flying Officer Lloyd Allan Trigg was awarded the Victoria Cross for an action in which his aircraft sank U-468, a German submarine. Flying out of Banjul, the Liberator V he piloted depth-charged the submarine, taking heavy anti-aircraft fire in the process and crashing into the ocean with the loss of all crew. The only survivors of the engagement were seven German crewmen, who commended the bravery of the aircrew, making this one of the few Victoria Crosses to have been awarded on the recommendation of an enemy officer (and the only VC to be awarded solely on enemy testimony).

== Aircraft operated ==
- 1941–1942 Lockheed Hudson IV
- 1942–1943 Lockheed Hudson III and IIIA
- 1942–1943 Lockheed Hudson VI
- 1943–1944 Consolidated Liberator V
- 1944–1945 Consolidated Liberator VI

== See also ==
- List of Royal Air Force aircraft squadrons
