= Lloyd Trigg =

Recipient of the Victoria Cross

Lloyd Trigg VC DFC
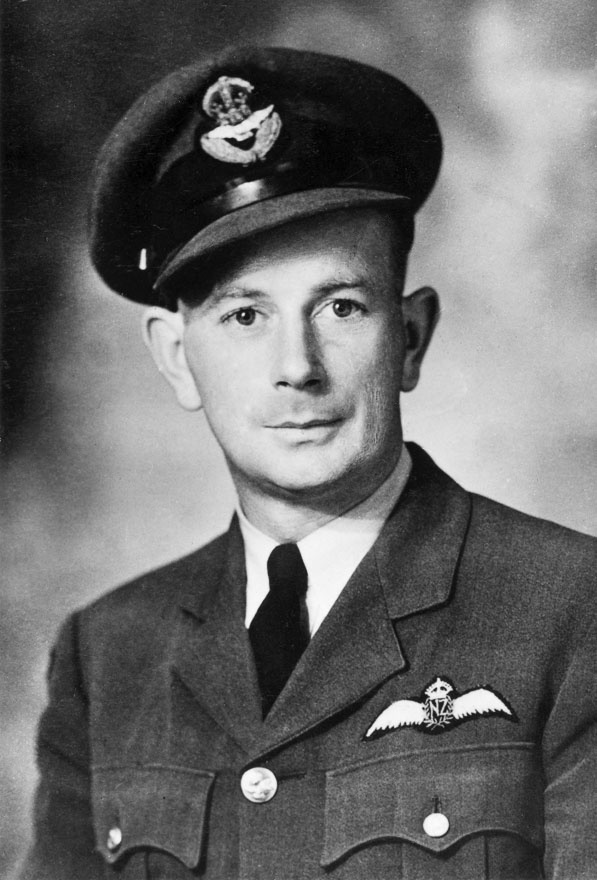
- Born: 5 May 1914 or 5 June 1914; Houhora, New Zealand
- Died: 11 August 1943 (aged 29) off Dakar, French West Africa
- Military career
- Allegiance: New Zealand
- Branch: Royal New Zealand Air Force
- Service years: 1941–1943
- Rank: Flying Officer
- Unit: No. 200 Squadron RAF
- Conflicts: World War II; Atlantic War †
- Awards: Victoria Cross; Distinguished Flying Cross

Flying Officer Lloyd Allan Trigg VC DFC (5 May 1914 or 5 June 1914 – 11 August 1943) was a pilot in the RNZAF during World War II. He was a posthumous recipient of the Victoria Cross, the highest award for gallantry in the face of the enemy for British and Commonwealth armed forces, and received the award for pressing home an attack on a German U-boat in August 1943. He was killed in the action. His award is unique, as it was awarded on evidence solely provided by the enemy, for an action in which there were no surviving Allied witnesses to corroborate his gallantry.

== Early life ==
Lloyd Allan Trigg, the son of Arthur and Cecelia Louisa Trigg (née White), was born at Houhora, Northland, New Zealand on 5 May 1914, or 5 June 1914, and was educated at Whangarei Boys' High School, where he served in the school cadet force. He later studied at Auckland University College and then took up farming in the Victoria Valley, as well as serving as a non commissioned officer in the part-time North Auckland Rifles prior to World War II.

== Military career ==
Trigg joined the Royal New Zealand Air Force (RNZAF) as a trainee pilot on 15 June 1941. On enlistment, his occupation was recorded as "machinery salesman" and he was married with two sons, having married Nola McGarvey in 1938. After completing basic training at the RNZAF base at Levin, Trigg attended pilot training school at No. 3 EFS in Canada. Noted for his hard work and willingness to learn, he was recommended for a commission. He obtained his pilot's wings on 16 January 1942, and was commissioned as a pilot officer. After converting onto the Lockheed Hudson and completing further training at a reconnaissance school, Trigg was promoted to flying officer and embarked for the UK in October 1942, to join Coastal Command.

He was posted to West Africa in November 1942 and joined 200 Squadron RAF in January 1943. As a first pilot he took part in over 46 operational reconnaissance patrols, convoy escort flights and anti-submarine patrols. Having previously operated Hudsons, the squadron later converted to the maritime version of the Consolidated B-24 Liberator. He was an experienced pilot (he had already been awarded the Distinguished Flying Cross) having been involved in two attacks against U-boats in February 1943.

He was flying his first operational flight in a Liberator V over the Atlantic from his base at RAF Yundum, West Africa (now Banjul, The Gambia). On 11 August 1943, Trigg took off from Rufisque Airfield in a B-24 Liberator heavy bomber on an anti-submarine patrol. When sighted, he engaged the German submarine U-468 under the command of Oberleutnant Klemens Schamong. His aircraft received several catastrophic hits from the submarine's anti-aircraft guns during its approach to the submarine and was on fire as Trigg made his final attack.

After dropping its depth charges, Trigg's Liberator crashed 300 yards behind its intended target, killing Trigg and his crew. The only surviving witnesses to Trigg's actions were the U-boat crew members. The badly damaged U-boat sank soon after the attack but a small group of survivors (including Schamong) were spotted by an RAF Short Sunderland of No. 204 Squadron in the dinghy of the crashed Liberator, drifting off the coast of West Africa. They were rescued by a Royal Navy vessel, HMS Clarkia, the next day, and the German crew reported the incident, recommending Trigg be decorated for his bravery. On 2 November 1943, Trigg was awarded the Victoria Cross for his actions.

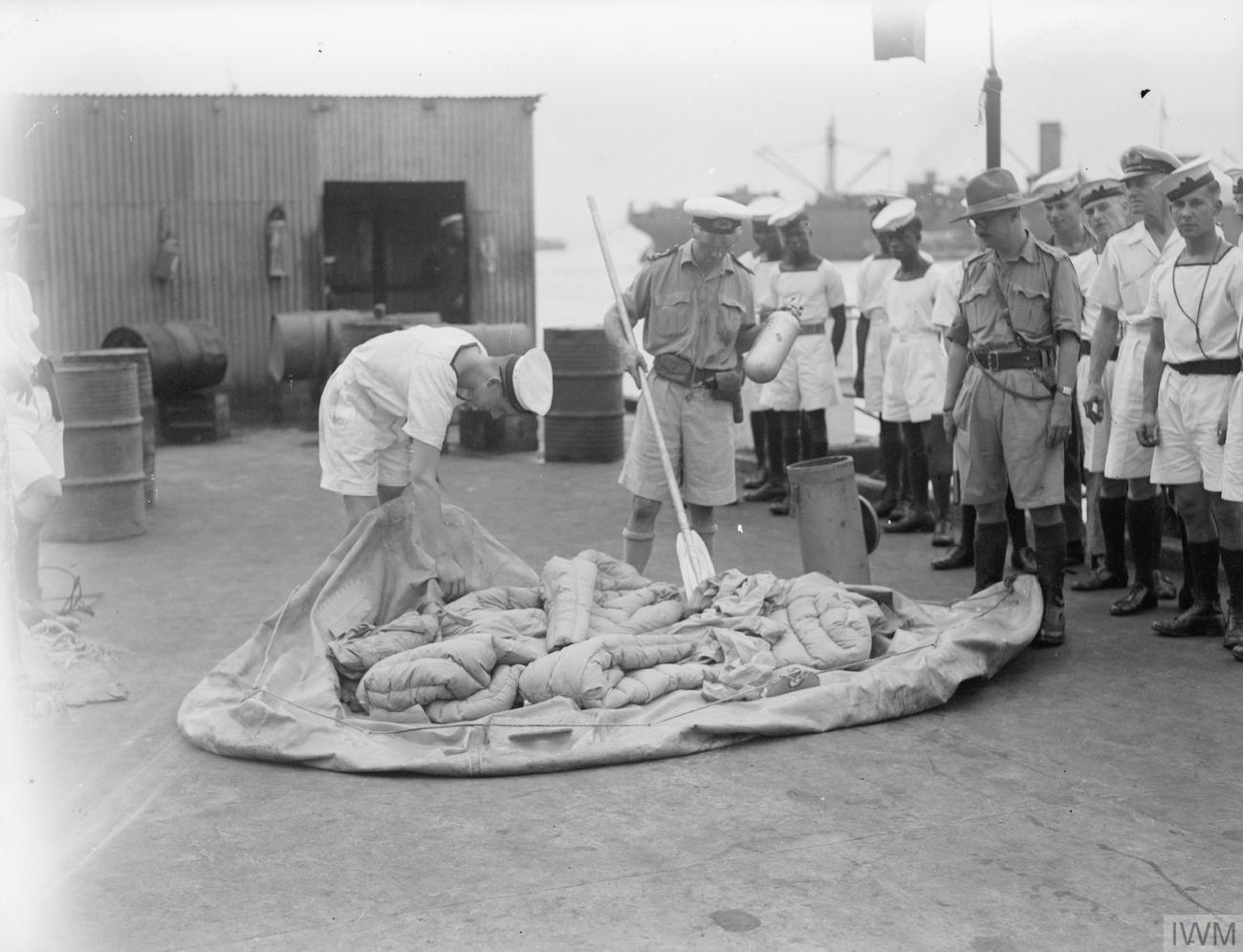
The intelligence officer of HMS Clarkia inspects the dinghy from Trigg's crashed Liberator, used by the survivors of the destroyed U-boat.

The Victoria Cross was presented to Trigg's widow, Nola, by the Governor General of New Zealand, Sir Cyril Newall, on 28 May 1944. At his wife's request, the presentation took place at the Trigg family home so that family and friends could be present. It was the last Victoria Cross to be won by a New Zealander; the Victoria Cross for New Zealand, established in 1999, is now the highest gallantry award that can be bestowed on a New Zealand serviceman.

Since Trigg has no burial place, he is commemorated on the Malta Memorial to the 2,298 Commonwealth aircrew who lost their lives around the Mediterranean during the Second World War and who have no known grave.

== Citation ==
The citation reads as follows:

Air Ministry, 2nd November, 1943.

The KING has been graciously pleased to confer the VICTORIA CROSS on the undermentioned officer in recognition of most conspicuous bravery: —

Flying Officer Lloyd Allan TRIGG, D.F.C. (N.Z.413515), Royal New Zealand Air Force (missing, believed killed), No. 200 Squadron.

Flying Officer Trigg had rendered outstanding service on convoy escort and antisubmarine duties. He had completed 46 operational sorties and had invariably displayed skill and courage of a very high order. One day in August 1943, Flying Officer Trigg undertook, as captain and pilot, a patrol in a Liberator although he had not previously made any operational sorties in that type of aircraft. After searching for 8 hours a surfaced U-boat was sighted. Flying Officer Trigg immediately prepared to attack. During the approach, the aircraft received many hits from the submarine's anti-aircraft guns and burst into flames, which quickly enveloped the tail. The moment was critical. Flying Officer Trigg could have broken off the engagement and made a forced landing in the sea. But if he continued the attack, the aircraft would present a "no deflection" target to deadly accurate anti-aircraft fire, and every second spent in the air would increase the extent and intensity of the flames and diminish his chances of survival. There could have been no hesitation or doubt in his mind. He maintained his course in spite of the already precarious condition of his aircraft and executed a masterly attack. Skimming over the U-boat at less than 50 feet with anti-aircraft fire entering his opened bomb doors, Flying Officer Trigg dropped his bombs on and around the U-boat where they exploded with devastating effect. A short distance further on the Liberator dived into the sea with her gallant captain and crew. The U-boat sank within 20 minutes and some of her crew were picked up later in a rubber dinghy that had broken loose from the Liberator. The Battle of the Atlantic has yielded many fine stories of air attacks on underwater craft, but Flying Officer Trigg's exploit stands out as an epic of grim determination and high courage. His was the path of duty that leads to glory.

— Supplement to London Gazette, 29 October 1943, (dated 2 November 1943)

== Legacy ==
In 2007, New Zealand researcher Arthur Arculus tracked down Klemens Schamong near Kiel. The commander said of Trigg's effort "such a gallant fighter as Trigg would have been decorated in Germany with the highest medal or order".

In May 1998, Trigg's VC was sold at auction by Spinks of London for £138,000, the highest price ever realised for a VC at that time. The seller was not believed to have been a relative of Trigg and the medals were purchased on behalf of the Michael Ashcroft Trust, the holding institution for Lord Ashcroft's VC Collection. The VC is now on display at the Lord Ashcroft Gallery at the Imperial War Museum.

Trigg Avenue, Rotorua is named in his honour.

Trigg's complete medal awards are:

- Victoria Cross
- Distinguished Flying Cross
- 1939–45 Star
- Atlantic Star
- Defence Medal
- War Medal 1939–1945
- New Zealand War Service Medal

== See also ==
- Sergeant Thomas Frank Durrant VC (1918-1942), whose award was supported by a recommendation from Kapitänleutnant F. K. Paul after the St Nazaire raid
- Lieutenant-Commander Gerard Broadmead Roope VC (1905–1940), whose award was supported by a recommendation and evidence from Kapitan zur See Hellmuth Heye, commander of the Admiral Hipper.

== Bibliography ==
- Ashcroft, Michael (2007) [2006]. Victoria Cross Heroes. Headline Review. ISBN 978-0-7553-1633-5.
- Bowman, Martin (2014). Battlefield Bombers: Deep Sea Attack. Pen & Sword. ISBN 9781783831975.
- Halley, J.J. (1969). Royal Air Force Unit Histories: Volume 1 Nos 1 to 200 Squadron. Air-Britain (Historians). OCLC 929540100.
- Harper, Glyn; Richardson, Colin (2007). In the Face of the Enemy: The Complete History of the Victoria Cross and New Zealand. Auckland, New Zealand: HarperCollins. ISBN 978-1-86950-650-6.
- Jefford, C.G. (1988). RAF Squadrons. Airlife Publishing. ISBN 1-85310-053-6.
