= Ouakam Airfield =

Former French military airfield in Dakar, Senegal

Ouakam Airfield
- Base Aérienne 160 Dakar-Ouakam
- Ouakam, Dakar in Senegal
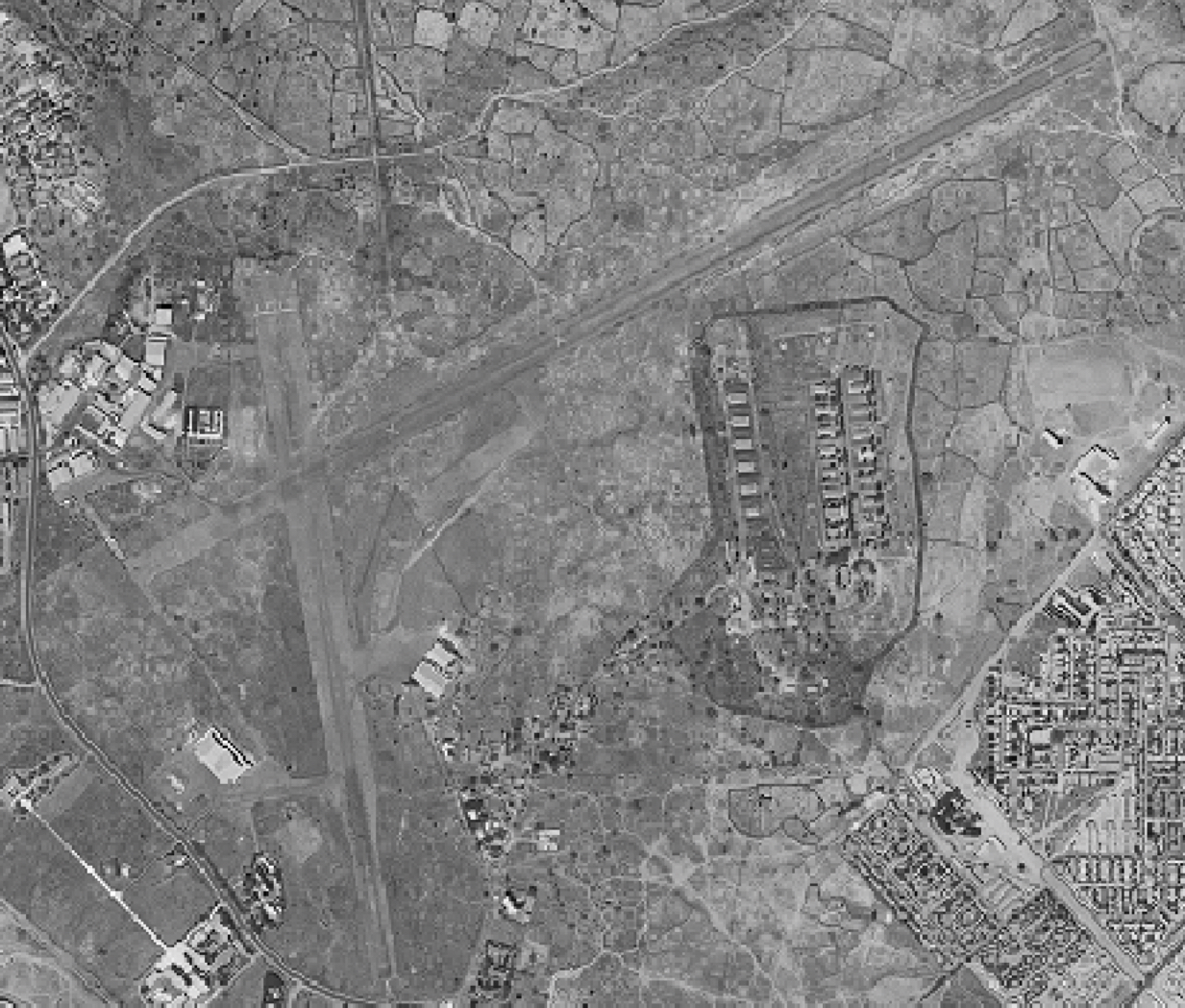
- Declassified satellite imagery of Ouakam Airfield captured by KH-7 on 19 February, 1966.

Site information
- Operator: Armée de l’Air; French Naval Aviation
- Open to the public: No
- Condition: Abandoned

Location
- Coordinates: 14°42′45″N 17°28′40″W

Site history
- Built: 1920
- In use: 1920 - 1964

Airfield information
Runways
Direction	Length and surface
01/19	1,200 metres (3,937 ft) Asphalt
08/26	1,850 metres (6,070 ft) Asphalt

Ouakam Airfield, also known as Dakar-Ouakam Airfield (French: Base Aérienne 160 Dakar-Ouakam), was a French military airfield located near Ouakam, a suburb of Dakar, Senegal. It was established in 1920, serving as an important Armée de l'Air and French Naval Aviation Base during World War II in West Africa.

== History ==
During the first half of 1912, Lieutenant Féquant made multiple overflights between Bambey, Louga, Thiés, Saint-Louis and Dakar on a Nieuport monoplane. A formal landing ground was first established in 1920 under French Colonia administration. Known as Ouakam Airfield, it was operated by the Armée de l’Air. The airfield was built to serve colonial interests and emerging airmail routes in the country. By the mid-1920s, Ouakam Airfield supported France's growing air routes in West Africa, which included the Latécoère airmail line that reached Dakar by 1925. In 1934, Ouakam Airfield was formalized as Base Aérienne 160 Dakar-Ouakam, with multiple infrastructure upgrades under facilitation. Two hard-surface runways were built intersecting each other. Additionally, the Armée de l’Air laid out hangars, fuel depots, barracks, and a small command complex. Civilian aircraft also used the airfield, primarily by Air France.

=== World War II ===
By 1939-1940, Ouakam Airfield hosted fighter units of the Armée de l’Air. In August 1940, the airfield came under the Vichy regime. Subsequently, Vichy-controlled forces occupied Dakar-Ouakam, which included both Vichy French Air Force and French Naval Aviation units. During the Battle of Dakar in 23-25 September 1940, Glenn-Martin 167s of a naval squadron based at Ouakam engaged British and Free French forces attempting to siege Dakar. On 29 September 1941, a Curtiss Hawk of GC I/4 based at the airfield attacked a RAF Sunderland bomber off the coast. On 1 March 1942, a naval air station (Base Aéronavale Ouakam) was constructed, which supported a French Navy torpedo-bomber squadron equipped with Glenn-Martin and Wellington bombers. Facilities included barracks, mess, fuel, ammunition storage, and anti-aircraft defenses.

After late 1942, Free French and Allied control was established over West Africa, and Ouakam Airfield was reverted to Allied usage. Allied planners found that Ouakam Airfield’s runways were too short for heavy aircraft, and that it was unable to handle growing transport air traffic. Subsequently, a larger airfield began construction nearby in 1943. During the construction, the United States Army Air Forces (USAAF) found Ouakam Airfield's runways unsuitable for heavy bomber and large transport operations, and instead took over a nearby small airfield near Rufisque. It was enlarged and renamed to Eknes Airfield. The larger airfield, named Mallard Airfield was opened in 1944 for civilian and USAAF operations, while Ouakam Airfield remained as an airbase. In the 1950s, the airfield served as a transit base for French colonial forces, which supported operations across West Africa and Indochina. Facilities include aircraft hangars, a control tower and operations building, fuel storage, maintenance workshops, and on-site barracks for stationed personnel. On 16 March 1952, the airfield was officially placed on guard duty, with the airfield maintaining minimal staff and facilities.

=== Closure ===
Following the Independence of Senegal in 1960, Ouakam Airfield gradually closed down operations. By the early 1960s, the French Air Force relocated operations to Mallard Airfield, now known as Dakar-Yoff. On 1 December 1964, Ouakam Airfield was handed over to Senegal, although a small Liaison Section equipped with Douglas C-47 Skytrain transports remained operational. Following the handover, the French naval base was disestablished. Today, most of the airfield has been redeveloped, with a portion of the runway left closed-off and disused.

== Units ==
The following lists the units that were based in Ouakam Airfield at one point:

French Air Force

- 6e Escadrille de Chasse (SPA 153), equipped with Dewoitine D.501 and D.502, 1939
- Groupe de Chasse I/4 and Groupe de Chasse II/5, equipped with Curtiss P-36 Hawk, 1940
- Groupe de Liaison Aérienne 48 (GLA 48), equipped with Lioré et Olivier LeO 45, Junkers Ju 52, and Martin Maryland, 1945
- 1ère Escadrille of Groupe de Liaison Aérienne 48, equipped with Lioré et Olivier LeO 453 and Junkers Ju 52/AAC.1, 1950s
- 2e Escadrille of Groupe de Liaison Aérienne 48, equipped with Dassault MD.312 and MD.315 Flamant and Broussard MH.1521, 1950
- Squadron 7S, equipped with Junkers Ju 52, October 1950 – January 1952

French Naval Aviation

- 3e Flottille, equipped with Martin Maryland 167F bombers, 1940 – May 1941
- 2e Flottille, May 1941 – September 1943
- 2e Flottille Bombardement (2FB), equipped with Vickers Wellington bombers, September 1943 – 1953
