= HMS Glowworm (H92) =

G-class destroyer built for the Royal Navy

Coordinates: 64°27′N 6°28′E

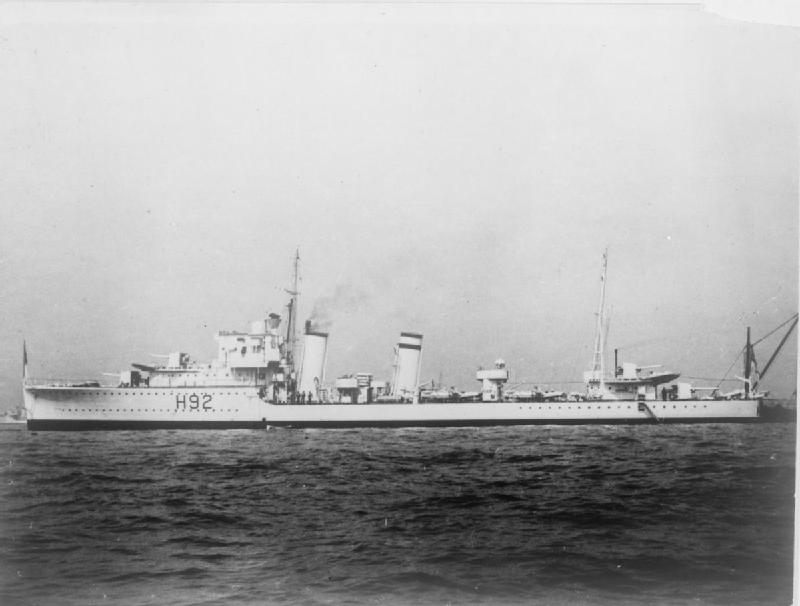
- Broadside view of Glowworm

History

United Kingdom
- Name: Glowworm
- Namesake: Glowworm
- Ordered: 5 March 1934
- Builder: John I. Thornycroft & Company, Woolston, Hampshire
- Laid down: 15 August 1934
- Launched: 22 July 1935
- Commissioned: 22 January 1936
- Identification: Pennant number: H92
- Motto: Ex tenebris lux : 'Out of darkness light'.
- Fate: Sunk by the German cruiser Admiral Hipper, 8 April 1940
- Badge: On a Field Blue, a lantern Black with rays issuing Silver

General characteristics (as built)
- Class & type: G-class destroyer
- Displacement: 1,350 long tons (1,370 t) (standard); 1,883 long tons (1,913 t) (deep load)
- Length: 323 ft (98.5 m)
- Beam: 33 ft (10.1 m)
- Draught: 12 ft 5 in (3.8 m)
- Installed power: 3 Admiralty 3-drum boilers; 34,000 shp (25,000 kW)
- Propulsion: 2 shafts, 2 geared steam turbines
- Speed: 36 knots (67 km/h; 41 mph)
- Range: 5,530 nmi (10,240 km; 6,360 mi) at 15 knots (28 km/h; 17 mph)
- Complement: 137 (peacetime), 146 (wartime)
- Armament: 4 × single 4.7 in (120 mm) guns; 2 × quadruple 0.5 in (12.7 mm) machine guns; 2 × quintuple 21 in (533 mm) torpedo tubes; 1 depth charge rack and 2 throwers, 20 × depth charges

HMS Glowworm was a G-class destroyer built for the Royal Navy in the mid-1930s. During the Spanish Civil War the ship spent part of 1936 and 1937 in Spanish waters, enforcing the arms blockade imposed by Britain and France on both sides of the conflict. Glowworm was transferred to the British Isles from the Mediterranean Fleet shortly after the beginning of the Second World War, to escort shipping in local waters.

In March 1940, she was transferred to the Home Fleet and participated in the opening stages of the Norwegian campaign. On 8 April 1940 Glowworm encountered German destroyers transporting troops to invade Norway in Operation Weserübung. The German destroyers tried to disengage and called for help from the heavy cruiser Admiral Hipper. In the battle, Glowworm, severely damaged, rammed Admiral Hipper, losing its bow and sinking shortly afterwards.

Kapitän zur See (Captain) Hellmuth Heye, the commander of Admiral Hipper, recommended that the captain of Glowworm, Gerard Roope, be awarded a posthumous Victoria Cross. There were only two other occasions when a VC was awarded at the recommendation of the opponent in the Second World War.

== Description ==
Glowworm displaced 1,350 long tons (1,370 t) at standard load and 1,883 long tons (1,913 t) at deep load. The ship had an overall length of 323 feet (98.5 m), a beam of 33 feet (10.1 m) and a draught of 12 feet 5 inches (3.8 m). She was powered by Parsons geared steam turbines, driving two shafts, which developed a total of 34,000 shaft horsepower (25,000 kW) and gave a maximum speed of 36 knots (67 km/h; 41 mph). Steam for the turbines was provided by three Admiralty 3-drum water-tube boilers. Glowworm carried a maximum of 470 long tons (480 t) of fuel oil that gave her a range of 5,530 nautical miles (10,240 km; 6,360 mi) at 15 knots (28 km/h; 17 mph). The ship's complement was 137 officers and men in peacetime.

The ship mounted four 45-calibre 4.7-inch (120 mm) Mark IX guns in single mounts. For anti-aircraft defence Glowworm had two quadruple Mark I mounts for the 0.5 inch Vickers Mark III machine gun. She was the test ship for the new quintuple torpedo tube mounts for 21-inch (533 mm) torpedoes. One depth charge rail and two throwers were fitted; 20 depth charges were originally carried, but this increased to 35 shortly after the war began.

== Operational history ==
=== Early career ===
Glowworm was ordered from the yards of John I. Thornycroft and Company, at Woolston, Hampshire on 5 March 1934 under the 1933 Construction Programme. She was laid down on 15 August 1934 and launched on 22 July 1935. She was completed on 22 January 1936 at a total cost of £248,785, excluding government-furnished equipment like the armament. Upon commissioning she was assigned to the 1st Destroyer Flotilla of the Mediterranean Fleet. Between 10 August and 9 September 1936, together with Grafton, she escorted the yacht Nahlin as King Edward VIII cruised the eastern Mediterranean.

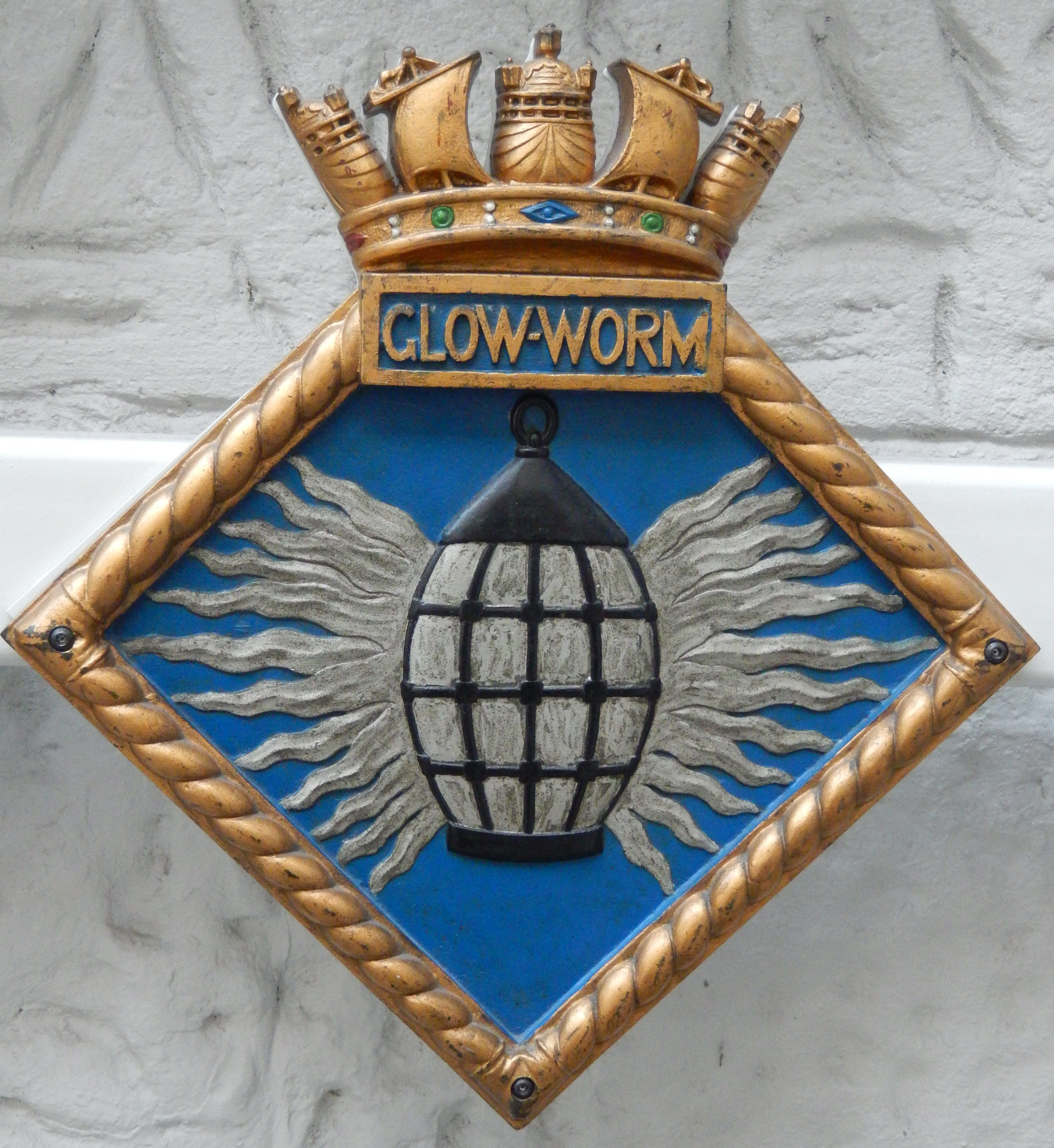
Badge of HMS Glow-worm

Glowworm patrolled Spanish waters during the Spanish Civil War, enforcing the edicts of the Non-Intervention Committee until she had a refit at Portsmouth between 27 May and 8 June 1937. The ship returned to the 1st Destroyer Flotilla in the Mediterranean after her brief refit. Glowworm returned to Portsmouth for a longer overhaul between 7 June and 25 July 1938 and escorted the ocean liner SS Strathnaver between Malta and Alexandria during the Munich Crisis in September 1938. She then escorted the Arethusa-class cruiser Arethusa on her voyage to Aden later that month. During night exercises on 16 May 1939, Glowworm collided with her sister, Grenade and was forced to put into Alexandria for temporary repairs. She received permanent repairs in Malta between 23 May and 24 June.

Glowworm was in Alexandria when the Second World War began in September 1939. In October the flotilla was transferred to the Western Approaches Command and Glowworm sailed for Britain on 19 October with her sisters Gallant, Grafton, and Greyhound. They arrived at Plymouth on 22 October and were deployed in the South Western Approaches. Glowworm carried out convoy escort duties and anti-submarine patrols until 12 November when she was transferred to the 22nd Destroyer Flotilla, based at Harwich, for North Sea patrol and escort duties. On 22 February 1940 she was hit by the Swedish ship Rex in fog whilst at anchor off Outer Dowsing. Glowworm suffered significant structural damage and was under repair at a commercial dockyard in Hull until late March. On completion of the repairs, she was transferred back to the 1st Destroyer Flotilla of the Home Fleet, rejoining the flotilla at its base at Scapa Flow on 20 March.

On 5 April Glowworm was part of the escort of the battlecruiser Renown, along with the destroyers Greyhound, Hero, and Hyperion. The ships covered the mine laying operation in Norwegian waters, Operation Wilfred. On 7 April, Glowworm was detached from the task force to search for a man lost overboard.

=== Admiral Hipper ===
Location of the final battle

On the morning of 8 April 1940 Glowworm was on her way to rejoin Renown when she encountered the German destroyers Z11 Bernd von Arnim and Z18 Hans Lüdemann in the thick fog before 8:00 a.m. The destroyers were part of a German naval detachment, led by the heavy cruiser Admiral Hipper, on its way to land troops at Trondheim as part of Operation Weserübung, the German invasion of Norway. Glowworm opened fire and the German destroyers attempted to disengage, signalling for help. The request was soon answered by Admiral Hipper and Glowworm was spotted at 09:50. Hipper had difficulty in distinguishing Glowworm from von Arnim but opened fire eight minutes later at a range of 8,400 m (9,200 yd) with its 203-millimetre (8.0 in) main armament.

Glowworm was hit by Hipper's fourth salvo and she made smoke and turned into it but the cruiser's radar-directed guns were not affected by the smoke. When the destroyer emerged from the smoke the range was short enough for the cruiser's 105-millimetre (4.1 in) guns to open fire. Glowworm's radio room, bridge, and forward 4.7-inch gun were destroyed and she received more hits in the engine room, the captain's day cabin and the mast. As the mast fell it caused a short circuit of the wiring and the ship's siren turned on.

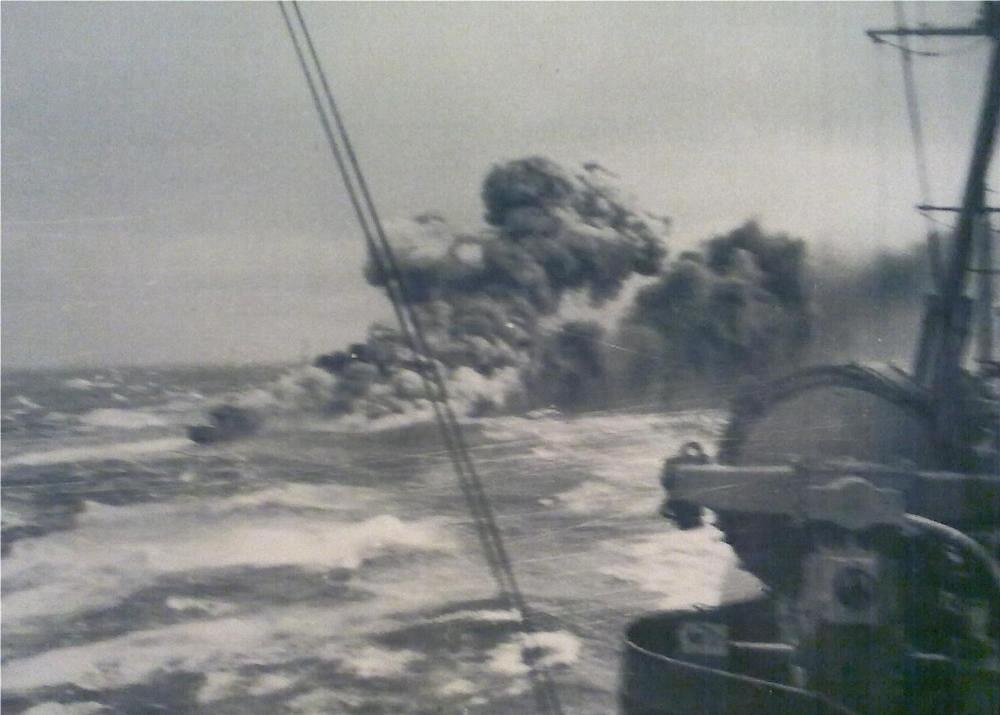
Glowworm on fire

At 10:10, Lieutenant Commander Gerard Roope fired five torpedoes from one mounting at a range of 800 m (870 yd). The torpedoes missed because Captain Hellmuth Heye had kept Hipper's bow pointed at Glowworm to minimize the risk from torpedoes. The destroyer fell back through her smokescreen to buy time to get her second torpedo mount working but Heye followed Glowworm to finish her off before she could fire the rest of her torpedoes. The two ships were very close when Hipper emerged from the smoke, and Roope ordered a hard turn to starboard to ram the cruiser. Hipper was slow to answer her helm and Glowworm struck the cruiser just abaft of the anchor.

The collision broke off Glowworm's bow and the rest of the ship scraped along Hipper's side, gouging several holes in the cruiser's hull, destroying her forward starboard torpedo mounting, and one of her sailors was lost overboard. Hipper took on some 500 t (490 long tons; 550 short tons) of water before the leaks could be isolated but was not seriously damaged. Glowworm was on fire when she drifted clear and her boilers exploded at 10:24, taking 109 of her crew with her.

=== Rescue ===
Admiral Hipper hove to and began to rescue survivors. The German sailor was not found but forty British sailors were recovered, although at least six later died of their wounds. The senior surviving officer, Lieutenant Ramsay, told his rescuers that neither the helm nor the emergency steering was manned when the ships collided. German accounts only mention four torpedoes fired by Glowworm but British accounts say all ten were fired. This was confirmed by photographic evidence taken after the collision showing empty torpedo tubes. Roope drowned when he could no longer hang on to a rope whilst being pulled up the side of the cruiser.

== Victoria Cross ==
Roope posthumously was awarded the Victoria Cross, becoming the first VC recipient of the Second World War. The award was justified, in part, by the recommendation of Heye, who wrote to the British authorities via the Red Cross, stating the dauntless courage Roope had shown when engaging a far superior ship at short range. Ramsay was awarded the DSO; the awards were made after the end of the war.
