= List of military actions for which a Victoria Cross was awarded =

This is a list of military actions which led to one or more of the combatants being awarded a Victoria Cross.

- 1898 Occupation of Crete
- Battle of Abu Klea
- Action of Elouges
- Andaman Islands Expedition
- Battle of Balaclava
- Battle of Arnhem
- Battle of Elandslaagte
- Battle of Guillemont
- Battle of Hill 70
- Battle of Hlobane
- Battle of Intombe
- Battle of Jutland
- Battle of Khaz Oruzgan
- Battle of Khushab
- Battle of Laing's Nek
- Battle of Morval
- Battle of Neuve Chapelle
- Battle of Peiwar Kotal
- Battle of Rorke's Drift
- Battle of the Ancre Heights
- Battle of the Canal du Nord
- Battle of the Imjin River
- Battle of the Scarpe (1918)
- Battle of Bau
- Battle of Bergendal
- Channel Dash
- Chitral Expedition
- Second Battle of Colenso (Colenso)
- Battle of Crete
- Operation Crusader
- Siege of Delhi
- Battle of Delville Wood
- Dieppe Raid
- First Battle of El Alamein
- First Mohmand Campaign
- Battle of Gazala
- Gold Beach
- Battle of Goose Green
- Battle of Hill 170
- Battle of Imphal
- Battle of Inkerman
- Battle of Isandlwana
- Battle of Kohima
- Relief of Ladysmith
- Battle of Le Cateau
- Battle of Leliefontein
- Siege of Lucknow
- Battle of Magdala
- Battle of Magersfontein
- Battle of Maiwand
- Manipur Expedition
- Battle of Mount Longdon
- Namsos Campaign
- Battles of Narvik
- Action at Néry
- Battle of Omdurman
- Operation Chastise
- Operation Struggle
- Second Ostend Raid
- Battle of Paardeberg
- Perak War
- Battle of Ratsua
- Samarra Offensive
- Battle of Sattelberg
- Second Battle of Heligoland Bight
- Shah Wali Kot Offensive
- Operation Shingle
- Siege of Mafeking
- Siege of Malakand
- Siege of Sevastopol (1854–1855)
- Operation Source
- St Nazaire Raid
- Battle of Tamai
- Battle of Tel el-Kebir
- Battle of the Tugela Heights
- Umbeyla Campaign
- War of the Golden Stool
- Zeebrugge Raid
