= Thomas Frank Durrant =

Recipient of the Victoria Cross (1918–1942)

- Born: 17 October 1918; Farnborough, Kent, England
- Died: 28 March 1942 (aged 23); St Nazaire, German-occupied France
- Burial place: La Baule-Escoublac War Cemetery, France
- Military career
- Allegiance: United Kingdom
- Branch: British Army
- Service years: 1937−1942
- Rank: Sergeant
- Nickname: "Tommy"
- Service number: 1874087
- Units: Royal Engineers; No. 1 Commando
- Conflicts: Second World War: Norwegian campaign; Western Front; St. Nazaire Raid (DOW)
- Awards: Victoria Cross

Sergeant Thomas Frank Durrant VC (17 October 1918 – 28 March 1942) was a soldier in the British Army during the Second World War and a posthumous English recipient of the Victoria Cross, the highest award for gallantry in the face of the enemy that can be awarded to British and Commonwealth forces. His award of the Victoria Cross was unique in that it is the only award given to a soldier in a naval action. It was also unusual, though not unique, in having been suggested by a German officer. (The other two cases in which VCs were awarded after recommendation by the enemy were Lt Cdr Gerard Broadmead Roope VC RN and Flying Officer Lloyd Trigg VC RNZAF.)

== Early life ==
Thomas Frank Durrant was born on 17 October 1918 and lived in Green Street Green, Farnborough, Kent. He attended Green Street Green Primary School, formally known as Vine Road Primary School. After leaving school, he worked as a butcher's boy, then as a builder's labourer.

== Military service ==
Durrant enlisted in the Corps of Royal Engineers prior to the Second World War on 1 February 1937. His service number was 1874047. In 1940 the British Prime Minister Winston Churchill ordered the formation of units of specially trained troops that would, "develop a reign of terror down the enemy coast." Durrant volunteered for service with the Special Service Independent Companies and was posted to No. 2 Special Independent Company. It was when serving with No. 2 Independent Company in the Norwegian campaign that he was promoted in the field to Sergeant. When his company returned from Norway all the independent companies were formed into battalion sized units known as Commandos. Durrant then became a member of No. 1 Commando.

=== St Nazaire ===
The St Nazaire Raid (Operation Chariot) was a seaborne attack on the heavily defended docks of Saint-Nazaire in occupied France on the night of 28 March 1942. This was a combined operation undertaken by Royal Navy and Commando units. The main commando force was provided by No. 2 Commando with supporting demolition parties from other commando units, including Durrant's No. 1 Commando. The intention of the raid was to destroy the dry dock which would force any large German warship in need of repairs, such as the Tirpitz, to return to home waters rather than seek safe haven in the Atlantic coast. Of the 600 men who left the port of Falmouth, Cornwall, England on the raid only 225 would return.

During the raid Sergeant Durrant was in charge of a twin Lewis gun on board H.M. Motor Launch 306. As it came up the river Loire to the port of St Nazaire ML306 came under heavy fire from the shore and was unable to land its troops at the Old Mole and it is during its withdrawal that it came head-to-head with a pursuing German torpedo boat Jaguar. In the battle with the German torpedo boat Durrant was wounded numerous times, in the head, both arms, legs, chest and stomach. After the battle Durrant died of his wounds in a German military hospital in St Nazaire. Following his death he was buried in La Baule-Escoublac War Cemetery, 7 mi (11 km) from Saint-Nazaire, in Plot I, Row D, Grave 11. A week later the commander of the Jaguar, Kapitänleutnant F. K. Paul, met the Commando commander, Lieutenant-Colonel Augustus Newman, in a prisoner of war camp in Rennes. Bringing the action to Newman's attention, Paul suggested that the colonel might wish to recommend Durrant for a high award.

His Victoria Cross citation reads:

For great gallantry, skill and devotion to duty when in charge of a Lewis gun in HM Motor Launch 306 in the St Nazaire raid on 28 March 1942.

Motor Launch 306 came under heavy fire while proceeding up the River Loire towards the port. Sergeant Durrant, in his position abaft the bridge, where he had no cover or protection, engaged enemy gun positions and searchlights ashore. During this engagement he was severely wounded in the arm but refused to leave his gun. The Motor Launch subsequently went down the river and was attacked by a German destroyer at 50 to 60 yards range, and often closer. In this action Sergeant Durrant continued to fire at the destroyer's bridge with the greatest of coolness and with complete disregard of the enemy's fire. The Motor Launch was illuminated by the enemy searchlight, and Sergeant Durrant drew on himself the individual attention of the enemy guns, and was again wounded in many places. Despite these further wounds he stayed in his exposed position, still firing his gun, although after a time only able to support himself by holding on to the gun mounting.

After a running fight, the Commander of the German destroyer called on the Motor Launch to surrender. Sergeant Durrant's answer was a further burst of fire at the destroyer's bridge. Although now very weak, he went on firing, using drums of ammunition as fast as they could be replaced. A renewed attack by the enemy vessel eventually silenced the fire of the Motor Launch, but Sergeant Durrant refused to give up until the destroyer came alongside, grappled the Motor Launch and took prisoner those who remained alive.

Sergeant Durrant's gallant fight was commended by the German officers on boarding the Motor Launch. This very gallant non-commissioned officer later died of the many wounds received in action.

== Aftermath ==
Durrant is buried in La Baule-Escoublac War Cemetery, France in Plot I, Row D, Grave 11.

The award of the Victoria Cross to Durrant was announced in the London Gazette on 15 June 1945, at the same time it was announced the Commando commander during the raid Lieutenant Colonel Augustus Charles Newman had also been awarded the Victoria Cross. On 29 October 1946 Durrant's Victoria Cross was presented to his mother at an investiture at Buckingham Palace by King George VI. Durrant's Victoria Cross is now on display at the Royal Engineers Museum Prince Arthur Road, Gillingham, Kent, England.

== Bibliography ==
- Chappell, Mike (1996). Army Commandos 1940-45. London: Osprey Publishing. ISBN 1-85532-579-9.
- Ford, Ken (2001). St Nazaire 1942: the great commando raid. London: Osprey Publishing. ISBN 1-84176-231-8.
- Moreman, Timothy Robert (2006). British Commandos 1940-46. London: Osprey Publishing. ISBN 1-84176-986-X.
