= Gerard Broadmead Roope =

Recipient of the Victoria Cross

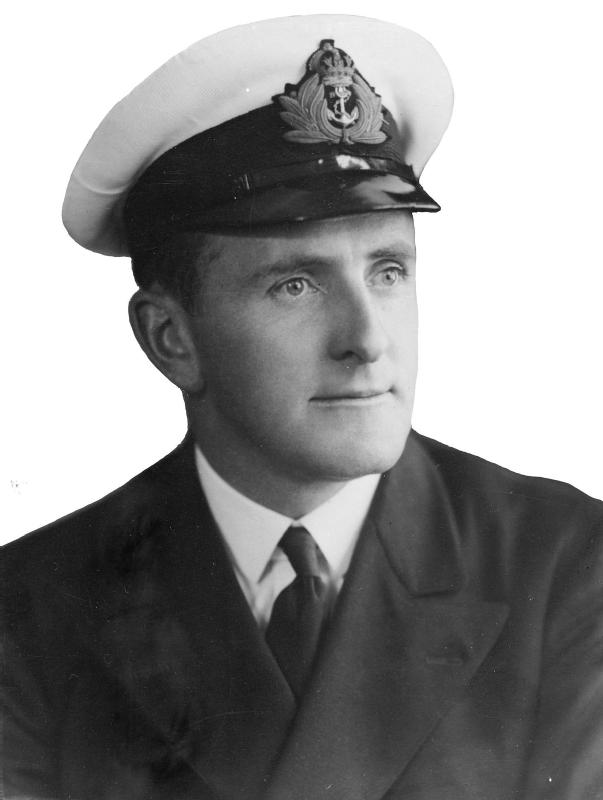
- Born: 13 March 1905; Taunton, Somerset, England
- Died: 8 April 1940 (aged 35); HMS Glowworm, Norwegian Sea, off Trondheim, Norway
- Military career
- Allegiance: United Kingdom
- Branch: Royal Navy
- Service years: 1927–1940
- Rank: Lieutenant Commander
- Commands: HMS Glowworm
- Conflicts: World War II: Norwegian campaign; Final battle of HMS Glowworm †
- Awards: Victoria Cross; War Medal (Norway)

Lieutenant Commander Gerard Broadmead Roope VC RN (13 March 1905 – 8 April 1940) was a posthumous British recipient of the Victoria Cross, the highest and most prestigious award for gallantry in the face of the enemy awarded to British and Commonwealth forces.

A 35-year-old Royal Navy officer, his action was the earliest awarding of a Victoria Cross in the Second World War (although the award was not gazetted until after hostilities ended) and is one of very few to have the award justified, in part, from a recommendation and supporting evidence provided by the enemy.

== Early life, education, and early naval career ==
Roope was born at Hillbrook, Trull, near Taunton in Somerset, son of Gerard Roope, described as a "gentleman of independent means", and Florence, daughter of Thomas Palfrey Broadmead, JP, of Enmore Castle, Somerset. The Broadmead family had owned Enmore Castle since the 1830s, becoming part of the landed gentry.

From the age of 13 he was educated at the Royal Naval College, Osborne and then the Royal Naval College, Dartmouth, and on 15 January 1923 was appointed a midshipman in the gunroom of the battleship Revenge. He subsequently served as a sub-lieutenant on the Concord and the Caledon, and on the Marlborough as a lieutenant, before taking command of the G-class destroyer HMS Glowworm on 22 July 1938.

== Gallantry in action ==
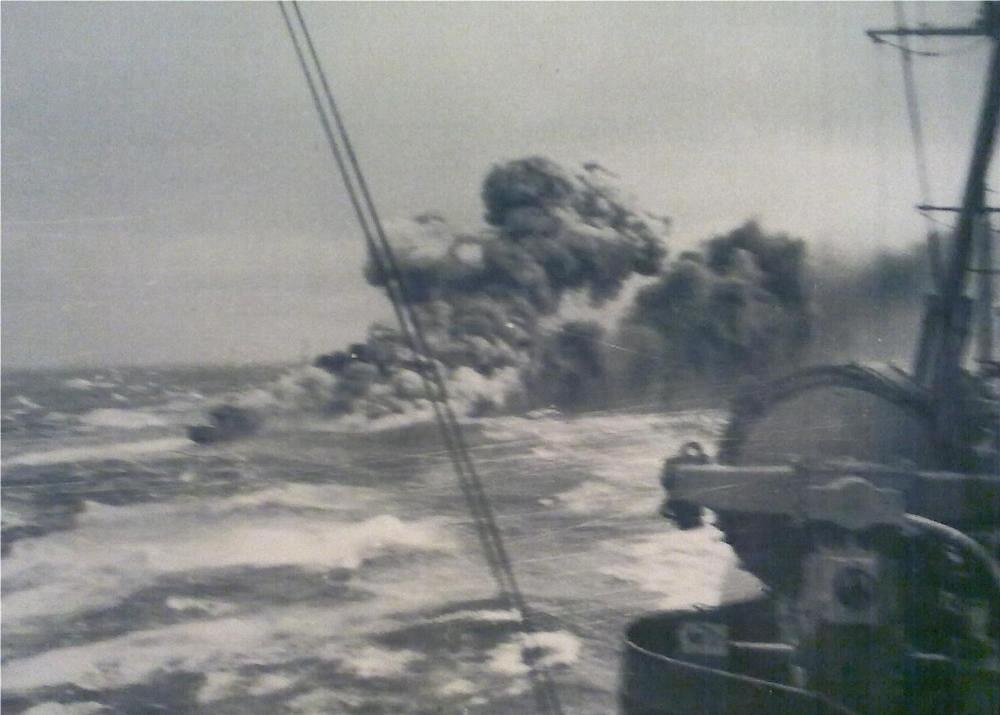
HMS Glowworm on fire after battling Admiral Hipper, 8 April 1940

On 8 April 1940, in the Norwegian Sea, the destroyer HMS Glowworm (1,345 tons), commanded by Lt-Cdr Roope, engaged two enemy destroyers while heading alone to Norway's West Fjord. After one of the enemy ships was hit, they both broke off and retreated to the north. Though aware that the enemy destroyers were attempting to draw him towards German capital ships, he gave chase. Glowworm soon spotted the German cruiser Admiral Hipper (14,000 tons). He alerted the Home Fleet before turning to engage the cruiser. Glowworm fired ten torpedoes but scored no hits and was soon battered by enemy rounds and set on fire. With only three guns still firing, the heavily damaged destroyer ended up ramming the cruiser, gouging open several holes in her hull and destroying her forward starboard torpedo mounting. Glowworm then fired one more salvo, scoring a hit, before she capsized and sank. Of the crew of 149, one officer and 30 men survived and were picked up by the Admiral Hipper. Lt-Cdr Roope drowned in the course of assisting the rescue of survivors. The Admiral Hipper's commander, Kapitän zur See Hellmuth Heye, wrote to the British authorities via the Red Cross, recommending award of the VC for his opponent's courage in engaging a vastly superior warship.

== The medal ==
The citation reads:

The KING has been graciously pleased to approve the award of the VICTORIA CROSS for valour to:—

The late Lieutenant-Commander Gerard Broadmead ROOPE, Royal Navy. On the 8th April, 1940, H.M.S. Glowworm was proceeding alone in heavy weather towards a rendezvous in West Fjord, when she met and engaged two enemy destroyers, scoring at least one hit on them. The enemy broke off the action and headed North, to lead the Glowworm on to his supporting forces. The Commanding Officer, whilst correctly appreciating the intentions of the enemy, at once gave chase. The German heavy cruiser, Admiral Hipper, was sighted closing the Glowworm at high speed and an enemy report was sent which was received by H.M.S. Renown. Because of the heavy sea, the Glowworm could not shadow the enemy and the Commanding Officer therefore decided to attack with torpedoes and then to close in order to inflict as much damage as possible. Five torpedoes were fired and later the remaining five, but without success. The Glowworm was badly hit; one gun was out of action and her speed was much reduced, but with the other three guns still firing she closed and rammed the Admiral Hipper. As the Glowworm drew away, she opened fire again and scored one hit at a range of 400 yards. The Glowworm, badly stove in forward and riddled with enemy fire, heeled over to starboard, and the Commanding Officer gave the order to abandon her. Shortly afterwards she capsized and sank. The Admiral Hipper hove to for at least an hour picking up survivors but the loss of life was heavy, only 31 out of the Glowworm's complement of 149 being saved.

Full information concerning this action has only recently been received and the VICTORIA CROSS is bestowed in recognition of the great valour of the Commanding Officer who, after fighting off a superior force of destroyers, sought out and reported a powerful enemy unit, and then fought his ship to the end against overwhelming odds, finally ramming the enemy with supreme coolness and skill.

— Supplement to London Gazette, 6 July 1945 (dated 10 July 1945)

The award was presented to his widow on 12 February 1946. This Victoria Cross is currently in private ownership and is not on public display.

== Personal life ==
Roope married Faith Dulcibella (1907–2001), daughter of George Frederick Clarke, of St Mary's Lodge, Argyle Road, Walton St Mary, Clevedon, Somerset, of a landed gentry family of Bridwell, Devon, and Theodora, daughter of Rev. John Benson Sidgwick, rector of Ashby Parva, Leicestershire. The Roopes lived at Richmond, then part of Surrey (now Greater London) and had a son and daughter. After the war Faith remarried. She died in 2001.

== Literary reference ==
The novel Battle of the April Storm, by Larry Forrester, is based upon the action between Glowworm and Hipper. The characters are fictional, including the Glowworm's captain, but the story depicts an "unlucky" ship that is redeemed by an heroic final action and, at the end, the fellowship between mariners, even enemies.

== See also ==
- Sergeant Thomas Frank Durrant VC (1918–1942), whose award was supported by a recommendation from Kapitänleutnant F. K. Paul after the St Nazaire raid
- Flying Officer Lloyd Trigg VC DFC (1914–1943), whose VC award was supported solely with a recommendation by and evidence from an officer in the Kriegsmarine
