= Eknes Airfield =

- Rufisque, Dakar in Senegal
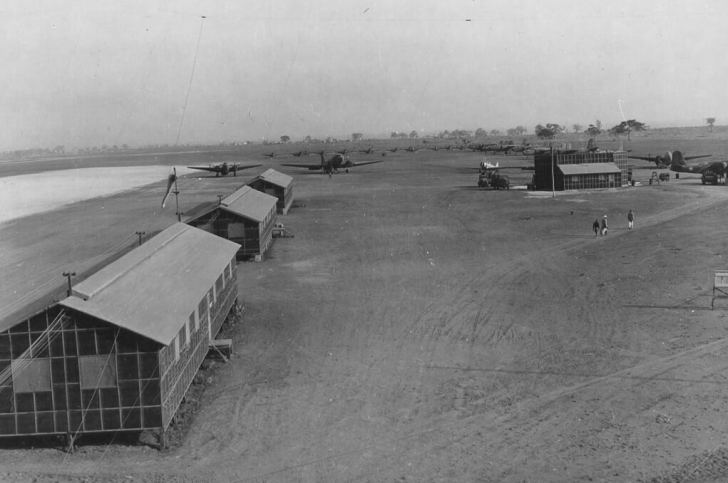
- USAAF Base Eknes Field on 28 February, 1944.

Site information
- Operator: Armée de l'Air; United States Army Air Forces
- Controlled by: Air Transport Command
- Open to the public: No
- Condition: Abandoned

Location
- Coordinates: 14°43′47″N 17°14′16″W

Site history
- Built: February 1943
- In use: February 1943 - June 1944
- Fate: Surplus to wartime needs

Eknes Airfield, also known as Rufisque Airfield, was an USAAF base located near Rufisque, a suburb of Dakar, Senegal. It primarily operated as a temporary transit and staging base of the Air Transport Command Northern African Wing from February 1943 until June 1944.

== History ==
Prewar, Rufisque Airfield was under control of the Armée de l'Air. Following the Smith-Boisson agreement made on 7 December, 1942, by General Dwight D. Eisenhower and Admiral François Darlan, the United States gained the right to use aerodromes, harbors, roads, and other facilities in French West Africa. The United States Army Air Forces (USAAF) found that Ouakam Airfield's runways were too short for heavy bombers, while construction of the larger Mallard Airfield was still underway. Subsequently, in December 1942, the U.S. Air Transport Command (ATC) Northern African Wing took over Rufisque Airfield for rapid expansion, and renamed it to Eknes Airfield.

"Eknes Field at Dakar was dusty and barren, with a steel mat runway. I had never landed on a steel mat before, and was a bit surprised by the rattling and clanking. Water was scarce, the food fair; toilet facilities were of the outdoor variety, except showers. We were required to wear boots, or put pants legs under stockings as protection against malarial mosquitoes."

— Colonel Charles H. Young, commanding officer of the 439th Troop Carrier Group

In February 1943, one 6,000-foot steel-mat runway was completed, and Eknes Airfield became operational. Later, another 6,000-foot steel-mat runway was completed. The USAAF began using Eknes Airfield as a staging base, receiving medium and heavy bombers, transport, and fighter escorts being ferried to the North African front. These arrived from Natal, Brazil, and also across the South Atlantic Route. Arriving aircraft such as the Martin B-26 Marauders of the 319th Bombardment Group, 12th Air Force would be refueled, serviced, and prepared for dispatch to Marrakesh and Casablanca in Morocco, and Tunis in Tunisia. In June 1943, permanent runways were being installed, which consisted of a crushed rock base by rollers, and the spraying of tar binder. Facilities included a barracks and personnel living quarters, which were built with prefabricated huts. The nearby Ouakam Airfield also assembled P-40 fighters arrived by ship, and would be flown a few miles east to Eknes Airfield for organization into convoys bound for operational theaters in North Africa.

=== Closure ===
In June 1944, Mallard Airfield was completed, and operations and personnel were fully transferred to the airfield, including the ATC. Following transfer, Eknes Airfield was deactivated as a staging base, and likely operated as an emergency landing ground afterwards. The US Government still retained certain continuing rights for Eknes Airfield by 1947. Eknes Airfield was also listed as having an Army Airways Communications System for use of the United States Air Carriers' overseas operations.

Today, only a runway portion of Eknes Airfield remains in derelict condition according to satellite imagery dated 2025.

== See also ==
- Ouakam Airfield
- Mallard Airfield
- Air Transport Command
