= Victoria Cross =

Highest military decoration for valour in the UK

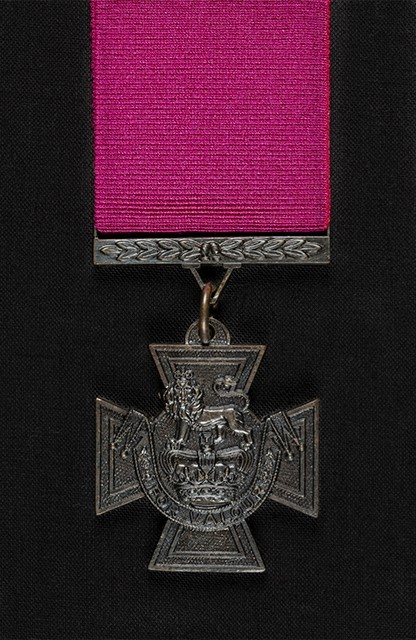
- Obverse of the cross; ribbon: 1 1/2 inches (38 mm), crimson (blue ribbon for naval awards 1856–1918)
- Type: Military decoration
- Awarded for: "... most conspicuous bravery, or some daring or pre-eminent act of valour or self-sacrifice, or extreme devotion to duty in the presence of the enemy"
- Description: Bronze Cross pattée with Crown and Lion Superimposed, and motto: "For Valour"
- Presented by: The monarch of the United Kingdom
- Eligibility: Persons of any rank in the Naval, Military and Air Forces of the United Kingdom, its colonies or territories, and Commonwealth countries that award UK honours; members of the Merchant Navy; and civilians serving under the orders, directions or supervision of any of the above-mentioned forces or services
- Post-nominals: VC
- Clasps: Bars can be awarded for further acts of valour
- Status: Active
- Established: 29 January 1856
- First award: 26 June 1857

Highlights
- Total: 1,358
- Total recipients: 1,355
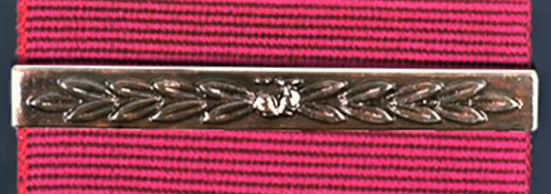
- Ribbon bar Second award bar

Order of Wear
- Next (higher): None
- Next (lower): George Cross (Equal in stature)

The Victoria Cross (VC) is the highest and most prestigious decoration of the British decorations system. It is awarded for valour "in the presence of the enemy" to members of the British Armed Forces and may be awarded posthumously. It was previously awarded to service personnel in the broader British Empire (later Commonwealth of Nations), but most successor independent nations have since established their own honours systems and no longer recommend British honours. It may be awarded to a person of any military rank in any service and to civilians under military command. No civilian has received the award since James Adams in 1879. Since the first awards were presented by Queen Victoria in 1857, two thirds of all awards have been personally presented by the British monarch. The investitures are usually held at Buckingham Palace.

The VC was introduced on 29 January 1856 by Queen Victoria to honour acts of valour during the Crimean War. Since then, the medal has been awarded 1,358 times to 1,355 individual recipients. Only 15 medals, of which 11 to members of the British Army and 4 to members of the Australian Army, have been awarded since the Second World War. The traditional explanation of the source of the metal from which the medals are struck is that it derives from a Russian cannon captured at the siege of Sevastopol. However, research has indicated another origin for the material. The historian John Glanfield has established that the metal for most of the medals made since December 1914 came from two Chinese cannon and that there is no evidence of Russian origin.

The VC is highly prized and has been valued at over £400,000 at auctions. A number of public and private collections are devoted to the Victoria Cross. The private collection of Lord Ashcroft, which has been amassed since 1986, contains over one-tenth of all Victoria Crosses awarded.

Beginning with Canada on its centenary of confederation in 1967, followed in 1975 by Australia and New Zealand, these countries developed their own national honours systems, separate from and independent of the British or Imperial honours system. As each country's system evolved, operational gallantry awards were developed with the premier award of each system, with the Victoria Cross for Australia, the Canadian Victoria Cross and the Victoria Cross for New Zealand being created and named in honour of the Victoria Cross. They are unique awards of each honours system recommended, assessed, gazetted and presented by each country.

== Origin ==
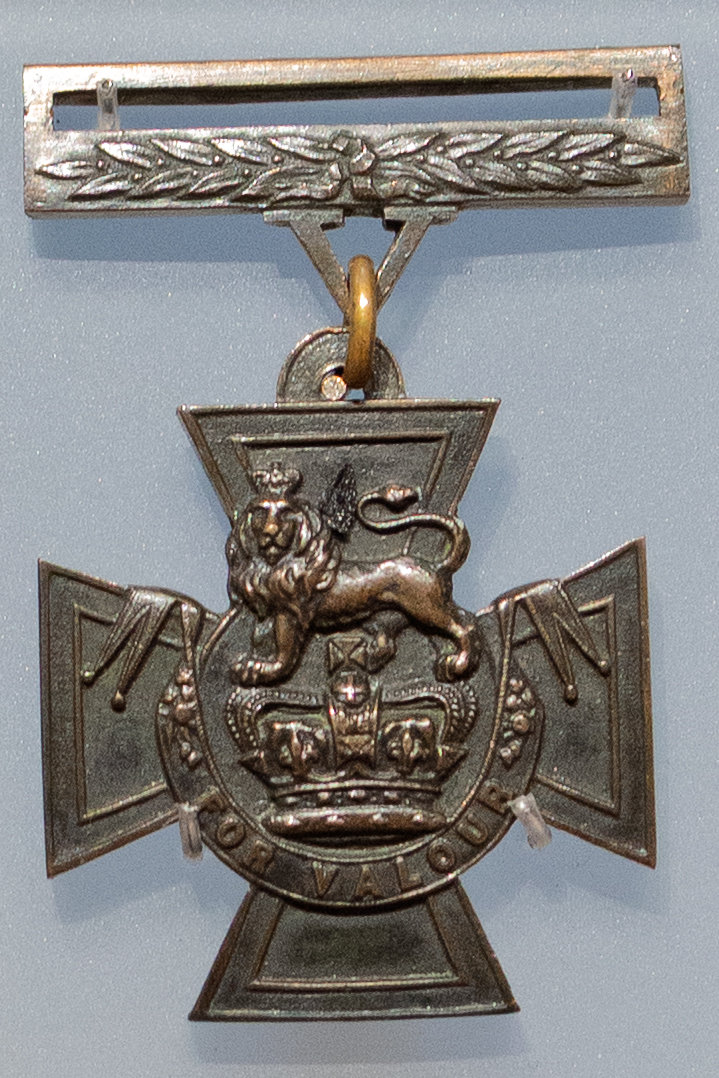
Prototype Victoria Cross submitted to Queen Victoria for her approval in February 1856, now in the National Army Museum

In 1854, after 39 years of peace, Britain was in a major war against Russia. The Crimean War was one of the first wars with modern reporting, and the dispatches of William Howard Russell described many acts of bravery and valour by British servicemen that went unrewarded.

Before the Crimean War, there was no official standardised system for recognition of gallantry within the British armed forces. Officers were eligible for an award of one of the junior grades of the Order of the Bath and brevet promotions while a Mention in Despatches existed as an alternative award for acts of lesser gallantry. This structure was very limited; in practice, awards of the Order of the Bath were confined to officers of field rank (Note: Original Warrant Foreword: "And, whereas, the third class of Our Most Honourable Order of the Bath is limited, except in very rare cases, to the higher ranks of both services, and the granting of Medals, both in Our Navy and Army, is only awarded for long service or meritorious conduct, rather than for bravery in action or distinction before an enemy.") and brevet promotions or Mentions in Despatches were largely confined to those who were under the immediate notice of the commanders in the field, generally members of the commander's own staff.

Other European countries had awards that did not discriminate against class or rank; France awarded the Légion d'honneur (Legion of Honour, established 1802) and the Netherlands gave the Order of William (established in 1815). There was a growing feeling among the public and in the Royal Court that a new award was needed to recognise incidents of gallantry that were unconnected with the length or merit of a man's service. Queen Victoria issued a warrant under the royal sign-manual on 29 January 1856 (gazetted 5 February 1856) that officially constituted the VC. The order was backdated to 1854 to recognise acts of valour during the Crimean War.

Queen Victoria had instructed the War Office to strike a new medal that would not recognise birth or class. The medal was meant to be a simple decoration that would be highly prized and eagerly sought after by those in the military services. To maintain its simplicity, Queen Victoria, under the guidance of Prince Albert, vetoed the suggestion that the award be called The Military Order of Victoria and instead suggested the name Victoria Cross. The original warrant stated that the Victoria Cross would only be awarded to officers and men who had served in the presence of the enemy and had performed some signal act of valour or devotion. (Note: Original Warrant, Clause 5: "Fifthly. It is ordained that the Cross shall only be awarded to those officers and men who have served Us in the presence of the enemy, and shall have then performed some signal act of valour or devotion to their country.") The first ceremony was held on 26 June 1857 at which Queen Victoria invested 62 of the 111 Crimean recipients in a ceremony in Hyde Park, London.

=== Manufacture ===
A single company of jewellers, Hancocks & Co, has been responsible for the production of every VC awarded since its inception.

It has long been widely believed that all the VCs were cast in bronze from the cascabels of two cannons that were captured from the Russians at the siege of Sevastopol. However, in 1990 Creagh and Ashton conducted a metallurgical examination of the VCs in the custody of the Australian War Memorial, and later the historian John Glanfield wrote that, through the use of X-ray studies of older Victoria Crosses, it was determined that the metal used for almost all VCs since December 1914 is taken from antique Chinese guns, replacing an earlier gun. Creagh noted the existence of Chinese inscriptions on the cannon, which are now barely legible due to corrosion. A likely explanation is that the cannon were taken as trophies during the First Opium War and held in the Woolwich repository.

It was also thought that some medals made during the First World War were composed of metal captured from different Chinese guns during the Boxer Rebellion. This is not so, however. The VCs examined by Creagh and Ashton both in Australia (58) and at the National Army Museum in New Zealand (14) spanned the entire time during which VCs have been issued and no compositional inconsistencies were found. It was also believed that another source of metal was used between 1942 and 1945 to create five Second World War VCs when the Sevastopol metal "went missing". Creagh accessed the Army records at MoD Donnington in 1991 and did not find any gaps in the custodial record. The composition found in the WW2 VCs, among them those for Edwards (Australia) and Upham (New Zealand), is similar to that for the early WW1 medals. This is likely to be due to the reuse of material from earlier pourings, casting sprues, defective medals, etc.

The remaining portion of the only remaining cascabel, weighing 358 oz (10.1 kg) (10 kg), is stored in a vault maintained by 15 Regiment Royal Logistic Corps at MoD Donnington and may only be removed under armed guard. It is estimated that approximately 80 to 85 more VCs could be cast from this source.

== Appearance ==
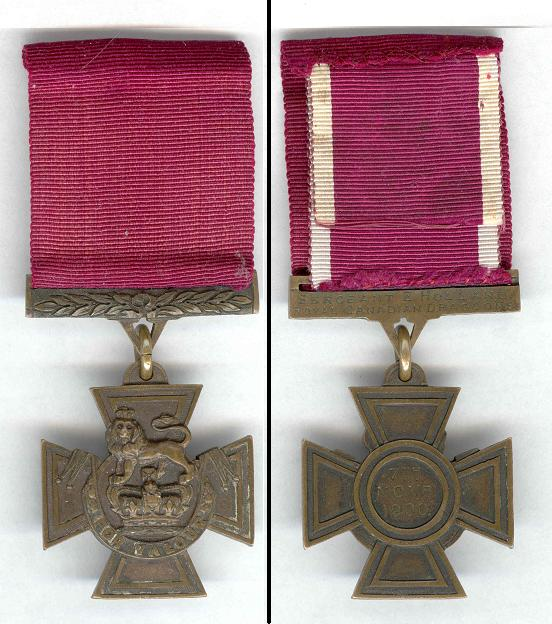
The front and back of Edward Holland's VC

The decoration is a bronze cross pattée, 1 39/64″ (41 mm) high, 1 27/64″ (36 mm) wide, bearing the crown of Saint Edward surmounted by a lion, and the inscription "for valour". (Note: Original Warrant, Clause 1: "Firstly. It is ordained that the distinction shall be styled and designated 'The Victoria Cross', and shall consist of a Maltese cross of bronze, with our Royal crest in the centre, and underneath with an escroll bearing the inscription 'For Valour'.") This was originally to have been "for the brave", until it was changed on the recommendation of Queen Victoria, as it implied that only men who were awarded the cross were brave. The decoration, suspension bar, and link weigh about 0.87 troy ounces (27 g).

The cross is suspended by a ring from a seriffed "V" to a bar ornamented with laurel leaves, through which the ribbon passes. The reverse of the suspension bar is engraved with the recipient's name, rank, number and unit. On the reverse of the medal is a circular panel on which the date of the act for which it was awarded is engraved in the centre.

The Original Warrant Clause 1 states that the Victoria Cross "shall consist of a Maltese cross of bronze". Nonetheless, it has always been a cross pattée; the discrepancy with the warrant has never been corrected.

The ribbon is crimson, 1 1/2 inch (38 mm) wide. The original (1856) specification for the award stated that the ribbon should be red for army recipients and dark blue for naval recipients, (Note: Original warrant, Clause Two: "Secondly. It is ordained that the Cross shall be suspended from the left breast by a blue riband for the Navy, and by a red riband for the Army.") but the dark blue ribbon was abolished soon after the formation of the Royal Air Force on 1 April 1918. On 22 May 1920 George V signed a warrant that stated all recipients would now receive a red ribbon and the living recipients of the naval version were required to exchange their ribbons for the new colour. Although the army warrants state the colour as being red, it is defined by most commentators as being crimson or "wine-red".

Since 1917 a miniature of the Cross has been affixed to the centre of the ribbon bar when worn without the Cross. In the event of a second award bar, a second replica is worn alongside the first.

== Award process ==
=== Selection ===
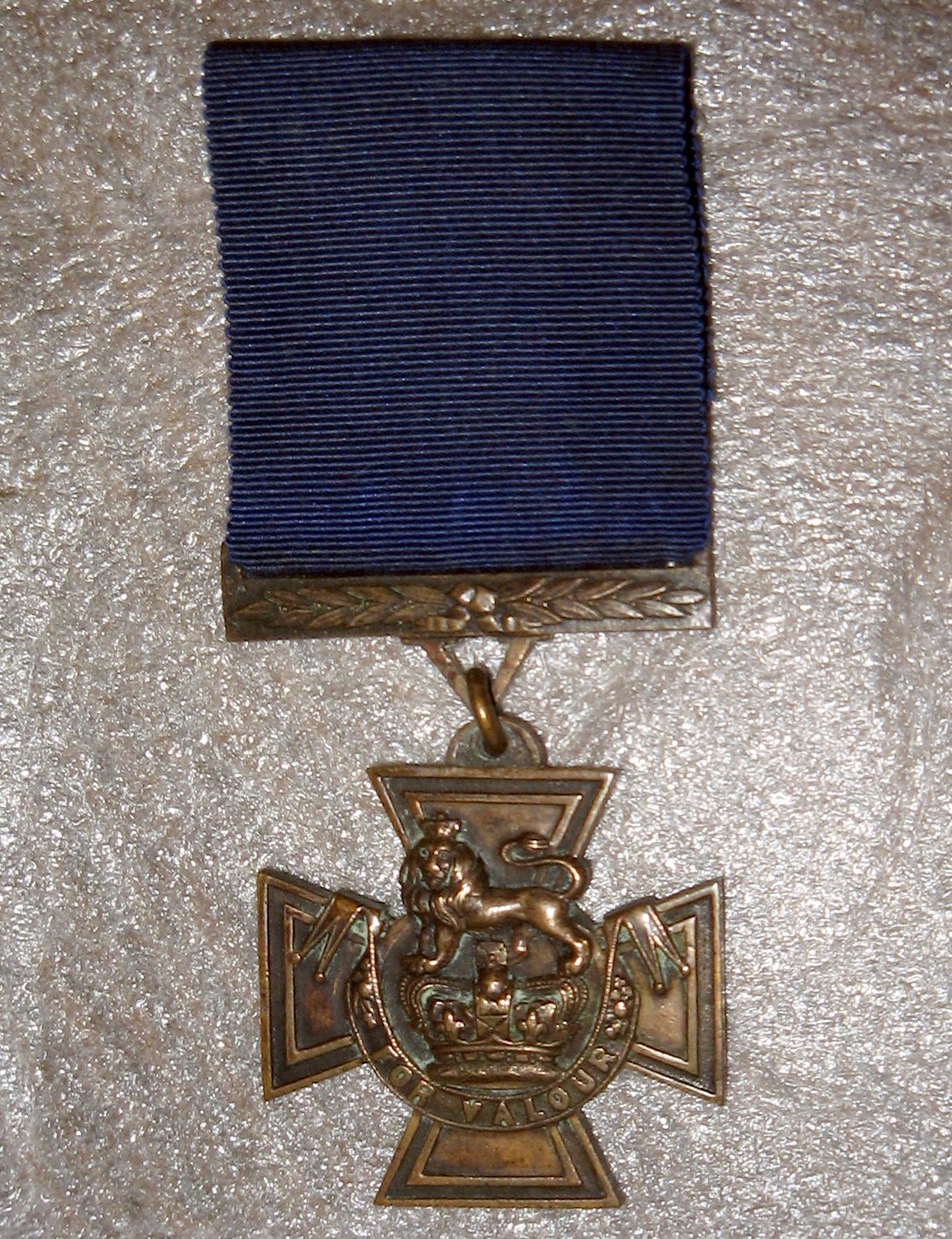
The obverse of William Johnstone's VC showing the dark blue ribbon for pre-1918 awards to naval personnel

The Victoria Cross is awarded for

... most conspicuous bravery, or some daring or pre-eminent act of valour or self-sacrifice, or extreme devotion to duty in the presence of the enemy.

A recommendation for the VC is normally issued by an officer at regimental level, or equivalent, and has to be supported by three witnesses, although this has been waived on occasion. The recommendation is then passed up the military hierarchy until it reaches the Secretary of State for Defence. The recommendation is then laid before the monarch who approves the award with his or her signature. Victoria Cross awards are always promulgated in The London Gazette with the single exception of the award to the American Unknown Soldier in 1921. The Victoria Cross warrant makes no specific provision as to who should actually present the medals to the recipients. Queen Victoria indicated that she would like to present the medals in person and she presented 185 medals out of the 472 gazetted during her reign. Including the first 62 medals presented at a parade in Hyde Park on 26 June 1857 by Queen Victoria, nearly 900 awards have been personally presented to the recipient by the reigning British monarch. Nearly 300 awards have been presented by a member of the royal family or by a civil or military dignitary. About 150 awards were either forwarded to the recipient or next of kin by registered post or no details of the presentations are known.

The original royal warrant did not contain a specific clause regarding posthumous awards, although official policy was not to award the VC posthumously. Between the First war of Indian Independence in 1857 and the beginning of the Second Boer War, the names of six officers and men were published in the London Gazette with a memorandum stating they would have been awarded the Victoria Cross had they survived. A further three notices were published in the London Gazette in September 1900 and April 1901 for gallantry in the Second Boer War. In an exception to policy for the Second Boer War, six posthumous Victoria Crosses, three to those mentioned in the notices in 1900 and 1901 and a further three, were granted on 8 August 1902, the first official posthumous awards. (Note: On 8 August 1902, in a partial reversal of War Office policy, recommendations for posthumous awards of the Victoria Cross were approved for officers and men who fell in the South African War 1899-1902 in the performance of acts of valour which would, in the opinion of the Commander in Chief, have entitled them to a Victoria Cross had they survived. The relevant recipients were: The three first names were men who had previously been the subject of Memoranda published in the London Gazette on 28 October 1900 for Younger and on 19 April 1901 for Digby-Jones and Albrecht stating that they would have been recommended for the Victoria Cross had they survived. The medals were now sent to their next of kin.: Captain David Younger, action near Krugersdorp, 11 July 1900; Lieutenant Robert Digby-Jones and Trooper Herman Albrecht, Battle of Wagon Hill, 6 January 1900; The following three names were gazetted for the first time and similarly medals were sent to their next of kin.: Lieutenant Gustavus Hamilton Blenkinsopp Coulson, rear-guard action, near Lambrecht Fontein, 18 May 1901; Sergeant Alfred Atkinson Battle of Paardeberg, 18 February 1900; Private John Barry action on Monument Hill, 7 and 8 January 1901) Five years later in 1907, the posthumous policy was reversed for earlier wars, and medals were sent to the next of kin of the six officers and men whose names were mentioned in notices in the Gazette dating back to the Indian Mutiny. The Victoria Cross warrant was not amended to explicitly allow posthumous awards until 1920, but one quarter of all awards for World War I were posthumous.

The process and motivations of selecting the medal's recipients has sometimes been interpreted as inconsistent or overly political. The most common observation has been that the Victoria Cross may be given more often for engagements that senior military personnel would like to publicly promote.

The 1920 royal warrant made provision for awards to women serving in the Armed Forces. No woman has been awarded a VC. (Note: Elizabeth Webber Harris was presented with a replica gold VC by the 104th Bengal Fusiliers for her valour in nursing cholera-ridden soldiers in India in 1869.)

=== Criteria ===
In the case of a gallant and daring act being performed by a squadron, ship's company or a detached body of men (such as marines) in which all men are deemed equally brave and deserving of the Victoria Cross, a ballot is drawn. The officers select one officer, the NCOs select one individual, and the private soldiers or seamen select two individuals. (Note: Original Warrant, Clause 13: "Thirteenthly. It is ordained that in the event of a gallant and daring act having been performed by a squadron, ship's company, or detached body of seamen and marines not under fifty in number, or by a brigade, regiment, troop or company in which the admiral, general, or other officer commanding such forces may deem that all are equally brave and distinguished, and that no special selection can be made by them, then is such case the admiral, general, or other officer commanding, may direct that for any such body of seamen or marines, or for every troop or company of soldiers, one officer shall be selected by the officers engaged for the Decoration, and in like manner one petty officer or non-commissioned officer shall be selected by the petty officers and non-commissioned officers engaged, and two seamen or private soldiers or marines shall be selected by the seamen, or private soldiers, or marines engaged, respectively for the Decoration, and the names of those selected shall be transmitted by the senior officers in command of the Naval force, brigade, regiment, troop, or company, to the admiral or general officer commanding, who shall in due manner confer the Decoration as if the acts were done under his own eye.")

In all, 46 awards have been awarded by ballot with 29 of the awards during the Indian Mutiny. Four further awards were granted to Q Battery, Royal Horse Artillery at Korn Spruit on 31 March 1900 during the Second Boer War. The final ballot awards for the army were the six awards to the Lancashire Fusiliers at W Beach during the landing at Gallipoli on 25 April 1915, although three of the awards were not gazetted until 1917. The final seven ballot awards were the only naval ballot awards with three awards to two Q-ships in 1917 and four awards for the Zeebrugge Raid in 1918. The provision for awards by ballot is still included in the Victoria Cross warrant, but there have been no further such awards since 1918.

Between 1858 and 1881, the Victoria Cross could be awarded for actions taken "under circumstances of extreme danger" not in the face of the enemy. (Note: Warrant Amendment dated 10 August 1858: "subject to the rules and ordinances already made, on Officers and Men of Her Majesty's Naval and Military Services, who may perform acts of conspicuous courage and bravery under circumstances of extreme danger, such as the occurrence of a fire on board ship, or the foundering of a vessel at sea, or under any of the other circumstance in which, through the courage and devotion displayed, life or public property may be saved.") Six such awards were made during this period—five of them for a single incident during an Expedition to the Andaman Islands in 1867. In 1881, the criteria were changed again and the VC was only awarded for acts of valour "in the face of the enemy". Due to this, it has been suggested by many historians including Lord Ashcroft that the changing nature of warfare will result in fewer VCs being awarded.

=== Colonial awards ===
The Victoria Cross was extended to colonial troops in 1867. The extension was made following a recommendation for gallantry regarding colonial soldier Major Charles Heaphy for action in the New Zealand Wars in 1864. He was operating under British command and the VC was gazetted in 1867. Later that year, the Government of New Zealand assumed full responsibility for operations, but no further recommendations for the Victoria Cross were raised for local troops who distinguished themselves in action. Following gallant actions by three New Zealand soldiers in November 1868 and January 1869 during the New Zealand Wars, an Order in Council on 10 March 1869 created a "Distinctive Decoration" for members of the local forces without seeking permission from the Secretary of State for the Colonies. Although the governor was chided for exceeding his authority, the Order in Council was ratified by the Queen. The title "Distinctive Decoration" was later replaced by the title New Zealand Cross. In addition, in 1870 Victoria sent six ceremonial Highland broadswords to New Zealand, to be presented as "Swords of Honour" to Māori rangatira who had served with distinction during the New Zealand Wars. The swords were presented in a ceremony in Wellington in June 1870 to Mōkena Kōhere, Te Keepa Te Rangihiwinui (Major Kemp), Te Pokiha Taranui, Henare Tomoana, Ropata Wahawaha, and Ihaka Whaanga.

The question of whether awards could be made to colonial troops not serving with British troops was raised in South Africa in 1881. Surgeon John McCrea, an officer of the Cape Colonial Forces was recommended for gallantry during hostilities which had not been approved by the British Government. He was awarded the Victoria Cross and the principle was established that gallant conduct could be rewarded independently of any political consideration of military operations. More recently, four Australian soldiers were awarded the Victoria Cross in the Vietnam War although Britain was not involved in the conflict.

Indian troops were not originally eligible for the Victoria Cross since they had been eligible for the Indian Order of Merit since 1837, which was the oldest British gallantry award for general issue. When the Victoria Cross was created, Indian troops were controlled by the East India Company and did not come under Crown control until 1860. European officers and men serving with the East India Company were not eligible for the Indian Order of Merit and the Victoria Cross was extended to cover them in October 1857. It was only at the end of the 19th century that calls for Indian troops to be awarded the Victoria Cross intensified. Indian troops became eligible for the award in 1911. The first awards to Indian troops appeared in the London Gazette on 7 December 1914 to Darwan Singh Negi and Khudadad Khan. Negi was presented with the Victoria Cross by George V during a visit to troops in France. The presentation occurred on 5 December 1914 and he is one of a very few soldiers presented with his award before it appeared in the London Gazette.

=== Separate Commonwealth awards ===
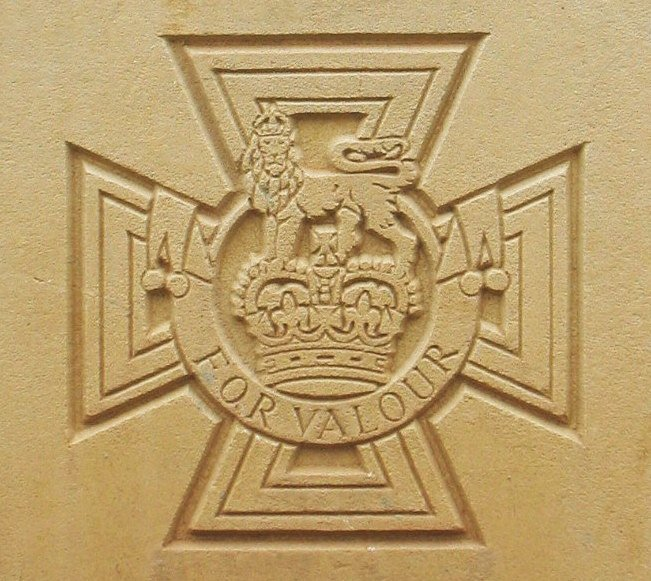
Victoria Cross as it appears on Commonwealth War Graves Commission headstones.

Since the Second World War, most but not all Commonwealth countries have created their own honours systems and no longer participate in the British honours system. This began soon after the Partition of India in 1947, when the new countries of India and Pakistan introduced their own systems of awards. The VC was replaced by the Param Vir Chakra (PVC) and Nishan-e-Haider (NH) respectively. Most if not all new honours systems continued to permit recipients of British honours to wear their awards according to the rules of each nation's order of wear. Sri Lanka, whose defence personnel were eligible to receive the Victoria Cross until 1972, introduced its own equivalent, the Parama Weera Vibhushanaya medal. Three Commonwealth realms—Australia, Canada and New Zealand—have each introduced their own decorations for gallantry and bravery, replacing British decorations such as the Victoria Cross with their own. The only Commonwealth countries that can now recommend the VC are the small nations that still participate in the British honours system, none of whose forces have ever been awarded the VC.

When the Union of South Africa instituted its own range of military decorations and medals with effect from 6 April 1952, these new awards took precedence before all earlier British decorations and medals awarded to South Africans, with the exception of the Victoria Cross, which still took precedence before all other awards. The other older British awards continued to be worn in the order prescribed by the British Central Chancery of the Orders of Knighthood.

Australia was the first Commonwealth realm to create its own VC, on 15 January 1991. Canada followed suit when in 1993, followed by New Zealand in 1999. While each of these new awards are technically separate from the British award, the Australian and New Zealand decoration is identical to the British design and is cast from the same gunmetal. The Canadian Victoria Cross is almost identical, except that the legend has been changed from "for valour" to the Latin "pro valore". This language was chosen so as to favour neither English nor French, the two official languages of Canada. It also includes metal from the same cannon, along with copper and other metals from all regions of Canada.

There have been six recipients of the Victoria Cross for Australia, four for action in Afghanistan and one awarded for action in the Second World War following a review. The first was to Trooper Mark Donaldson (Special Air Service Regiment) on 16 January 2009 for actions during Operation Slipper, the Australian contribution to the War in Afghanistan; Ben Roberts-Smith, Daniel Keighran and Cameron Baird were also awarded the Victoria Cross for Australia for actions in Afghanistan. Teddy Sheean was awarded the VC after the Australian Government convened an expert panel to review his case. The Victoria Cross for New Zealand has been awarded once: Corporal Willie Apiata (New Zealand Special Air Service) on 2 July 2007, for his actions in the War in Afghanistan in 2004. The Canadian Victoria Cross has been cast once, to be awarded to the Unknown Soldier at the rededication of the Vimy Memorial on 7 April 2007 (this date being chosen as it was the 90th anniversary of the battle of Vimy Ridge), but pressure from veterans' organisations caused the plan to be dropped.

== Privileges ==
=== Authority ===
As the highest award for valour of the United Kingdom, the Victoria Cross is always the first award to be presented at an investiture, even before knighthoods, as was shown at the investiture of Private Johnson Beharry, who received his medal before General Sir Mike Jackson received his knighthood. Owing to its status, the VC is always the first decoration worn in a row of medals and it is the first set of post-nominal letters used to indicate any decoration or order. Similar acts of extreme valour that do not take place in the face of the enemy are honoured with the George Cross (GC), which has equal precedence but is awarded second because the GC is newer.

It is not statutory for "all ranks to salute a bearer of the Victoria Cross". There is no official requirement that appears in the official warrant of the VC, nor in King's Regulations and Orders, but tradition dictates that this occurs and, consequently, senior officers will salute a private awarded a VC or GC.

As there was no formal order of wear laid down, (Note: The original Warrant and the Queen's Regulations for the Army prior to 1881 give no indication on how the decoration was to be worn alongside other medals.) the Victoria Cross was at first worn as the recipient fancied. It was popular to pin it on the left side of the chest over the heart, with other decorations grouped around the VC. The Queen's Regulations for the Army of 1881 gave clear instructions on how to wear it; the VC had to follow the badge of the Order of the Indian Empire. In 1900 it was ordained in Dress Regulations for the Army that it should be worn after the cross of a Member of the Royal Victorian Order. It was only in 1902 that Edward VII gave the cross its present position on a bar brooch. The cross is also worn as a miniature decoration on a brooch or a chain with mess jacket, white tie or black tie. As a bearer of the VC is not a Companion in an Order of Chivalry, the VC has no place in a coat of arms.

=== Annuity ===
The original warrant stated that NCOs and private soldiers or seamen on the Victoria Cross Register were entitled to a £10 per annum annuity (Note: Original Warrant, Clause 14: "It is ordained that every warrant officer, petty officer, seaman or marine, or non-commissioned officer, or soldier who shall have received the Cross, shall, from the date of the act by which the Decoration has been gained be entitled to a special pension of 10 pounds a year, and each additional bar conferred under Rule 4 on such warrant or petty officers, or non-commissioned officers or men, shall carry with it an additional pension of 5 pounds per annum.") In 1898, Queen Victoria raised the pension to £50 for those that could not earn a livelihood, be it from old age or infirmity. (Note: Warrant Amendment 1898-07-1898 "... authorize the increase of the Victoria Cross pension from 10 pounds to 50 pounds per annum, the condition to be satisfied in such cases being inability to earn a livelihood, in consequence of age or infirmity occasioned by causes beyond an Annuitant's control.") Today holders of the Victoria Cross or George Cross are entitled to an annuity, the amount of which is determined by the awarding government. Since 2015, the annuity paid by the British Government is £10,000 per year. This is exempted from tax for British taxpayers by Section 638 Income Tax (Earnings and Pensions) Act 2003, along with pensions or annuities from other awards for bravery. In Canada, under the Gallantry Awards Order, members of the Canadian Forces or people who joined the British forces before 31 March 1949 while domiciled in Canada or Newfoundland receive Can$3,000 per year. Under Subsection 103.4 of the Veterans' Entitlements Act 1986, the Australian Government provides a Victoria Cross Allowance. Until November 2005 the amount was A$3,230 per year. Since then this amount has been increased annually in line with the Australian Consumer Price Index. (Note: Australian Veteran's Entitlement Act 1986, Clause 103, "Victoria Cross allowance granted to a veteran under this section is payable at the rate of A$3,230 per year. The amount fixed by this subsection is indexed annually in line with CPI increases.")

=== Forfeited awards ===
The original royal warrant involved an expulsion clause that allowed for a recipient's name to be erased from the official register in certain wholly discreditable circumstances and his pension cancelled. (Note: Original Warrant Clause 15: "Fifteenthly. In order to make such additional provision as shall effectually preserve pure this most honourable distinction, it is ordained that, if any person be convicted of treason, cowardice, felony, or of any infamous crime, or if he be accused of any such offence, and doth not after a reasonable time surrender himself to be tried for the same, his name shall forthwith be erased from the registry of individuals upon whom the said Decoration shall have been conferred, and by an especial Warrant under Our Royal Sign Manual, and the pension conferred under Rule 14 shall cease and determine from the date of such Warrant. It is hereby further declared, that We, Our Heirs and Given Successors, shall be the all judges of the circumstances requiring such expulsion; moreover, We shall at all times have power to restore such persons as may at any time have been expelled, both to the enjoyment of the Decoration and Pension.") Eight were forfeited between 1861 and 1908. The power to cancel and restore awards is still included in the Victoria Cross warrant.

King George V felt very strongly that the decoration should never be forfeited and in a letter from his Private Secretary, Lord Stamfordham, on 26 July 1920, his views are forcefully expressed:

The King feels so strongly that, no matter the crime committed by anyone on whom the VC has been conferred, the decoration should not be forfeited. Even were a VC to be sentenced to be hanged for murder, he should be allowed to wear his VC on the scaffold.

== Recipients ==
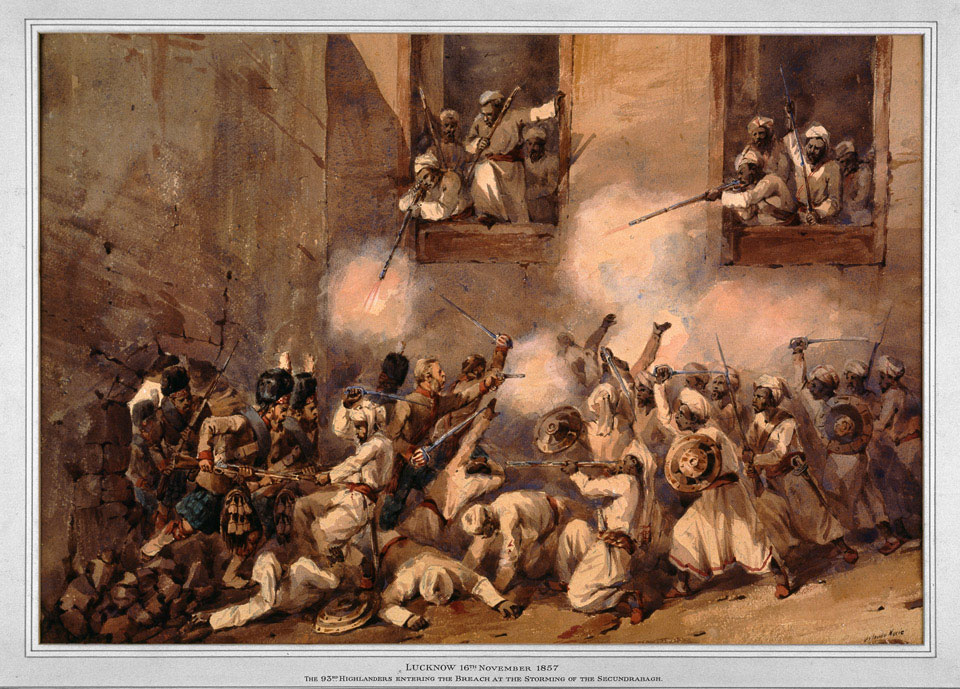
"Lucknow 16 November 1857. The 93rd Highlanders Entering The Breach At The Storming of the Secundrabagh" depicts 93rd Highlanders storming Sikandar Bagh, 17 VCs were awarded for the action.

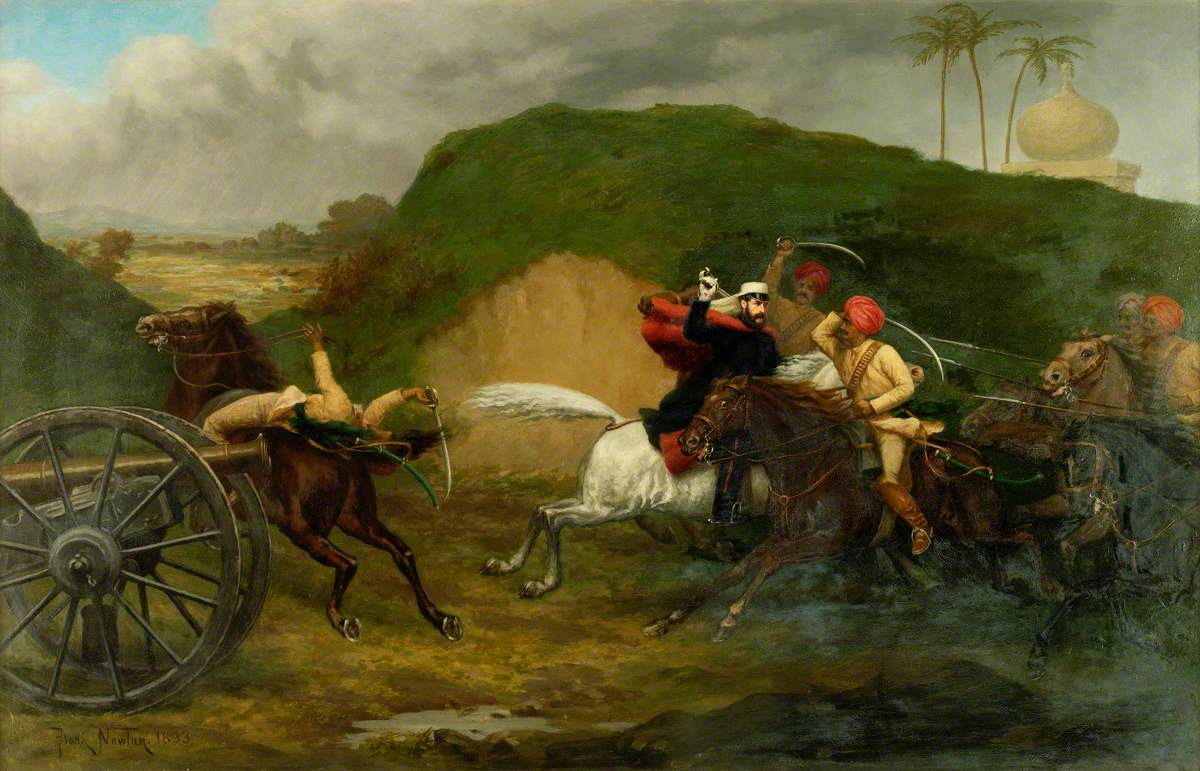
"James Hill Johnes, VC, Attacking the Enemy" by Frank Nowlan depicts James Hills-Johnes earning his Victoria Cross at the siege of Delhi in July 1857

A total of 1,358 Victoria Crosses have been awarded since 1856 to 1,355 men. The greatest number of Victoria Crosses awarded for a single day was 24 for deeds performed during the Indian Mutiny on 16 November 1857, 23 for deeds at Lucknow and one by Francis David Millet Brown for action at Narnoul. The greatest number won by a single unit during a single action is seven, to the 2nd battalion of the 24th Foot, for the defence of Rorke's Drift, 22–23 January 1879, during the Zulu War. The greatest number won in a single conflict is 628, during the First World War. Ishar Singh became the first Indian Sikh to receive the award. Eight of the 12 surviving holders of the Victoria Cross attended the 150th Anniversary service of remembrance at Westminster Abbey on 26 June 2006.

Three people have been awarded the VC and Bar, the bar representing a second award of the VC. They are Noel Godfrey Chavasse and Arthur Martin-Leake, both doctors in the Royal Army Medical Corps, for rescuing wounded under fire; and New Zealander Captain Charles Upham, an infantryman, for combat actions. Upham remains the only combatant soldier to have received a VC and Bar. Surgeon General William George Nicholas Manley, an Irishman, is the sole recipient of both the Victoria Cross and the Iron Cross. The VC was awarded for his actions during the Waikato-Hauhau Maori War, New Zealand on 29 April 1864, while the Iron Cross was awarded for tending the wounded during the Franco-Prussian War of 1870–71. Royal New Zealand Air Force Flying Officer Lloyd Trigg is the only serviceman ever awarded a VC on evidence solely provided by the enemy, for an action in which there were no surviving Allied witnesses. The recommendation was made by the captain of the German submarine U-468 sunk by Trigg's aircraft. Lieutenant Commander Gerard Roope was also awarded a VC on recommendation of the enemy, the captain of the Admiral Hipper, but there were also numerous surviving Allied witnesses to corroborate his actions.

Since the end of the Second World War, the original VC has been awarded 15 times: four in the Korean War, one in the Indonesia-Malaysia confrontation in 1965, four to Australians in the Vietnam War, two during the Falklands War in 1982, one in the Iraq War in 2004, and three in the War in Afghanistan for actions in 2006, 2012 and 2013.

In 1921, the British Unknown Warrior was awarded the US Medal of Honor and reciprocally the Victoria Cross was presented to the American Unknown Soldier of the First World War. This is the only ungazetted VC award following the normal British practice for both gallantry and meritorious awards to foreign recipients not being gazetted. It is included in the total of 1,358 awards.

In 1856, Queen Victoria laid an unnamed Victoria Cross beneath the foundation stone of Netley Military hospital. When the hospital was demolished in 1966 the VC, known as "The Netley VC", was retrieved and is now on display in the Army Medical Services Museum, Mytchett, near Aldershot. This VC is not counted in official statistics.

== Public sales ==
Since 1879, more than 300 Victoria Crosses have been publicly auctioned or advertised. Others have been privately sold. The value of the VC can be seen by the increasing sums that the medals reach at auctions. In 1955 the set of medals awarded to Edmund Barron Hartley was bought at Sotheby's for the then record price of £300 (approximately £9500 in present-day terms). In October 1966 the Middlesex Regiment paid a new record figure of £900 (approximately £14600 in present-day terms) for a VC awarded after the Battle of the Somme. In January 1969, the record reached £1700 (£31500) for the medal set of William Rennie. In April 2004 the VC awarded in 1944 to Sergeant Norman Jackson, RAF, was sold at an auction for £235,250. On 24 July 2006, an auction at Bonhams in Sydney of the VC awarded to Captain Alfred Shout fetched a world record hammer price of A$1 million (approximately £410,000 at the time). In November 2009, it was reported that almost £1.5 million was paid to St Peter's College, Oxford by Lord Ashcroft for the VC and bar awarded to Noel Chavasse. Vice Admiral Gordon Campbell's medal group, including the VC he received for actions while in command of HMS Farnborough, was reportedly sold for a record £840,000 in 2017.

== Thefts ==
Several VCs have been stolen and, being valuable, have been placed on the Interpol watch-list for stolen items. The VC awarded to Milton Gregg, which was donated to the Royal Canadian Regiment Museum in London, Ontario, Canada in 1979, was stolen on Canada Day (1 July 1980), when the museum was overcrowded and has been missing since. A VC awarded in 1917 to Canadian soldier Corporal Filip Konowal was stolen from the same museum in 1973 and was not recovered until 2004.

On 2 December 2007, nine VCs were among 100 medals (12 sets) stolen from locked, reinforced glass cabinets at the QEII Army Memorial Museum in Waiouru, New Zealand, with a value of around NZD$20 million. Charles Upham's VC and Bar was among these. A reward of NZ$300,000, provided by Lord Ashcroft, was posted for information leading to the recovery of the decorations. On 16 February 2008, New Zealand Police announced that all of the medals had been recovered.

== Collections ==
There are a number of collections of Victoria Crosses. The VC collection of businessman and politician Lord Ashcroft, amassed since 1986, contains 162 medals, over one-tenth of all VCs awarded. It is the largest collection of such decorations. In July 2008 it was announced that Ashcroft was to donate £5 million for a permanent gallery at the Imperial War Museum where the 50 VCs held by the museum would be put on display alongside his collection. The Lord Ashcroft Gallery at the Imperial War Museum opened on 12 November 2010, containing a total of 210 VCs and 31 GCs. After a 2008 donation to the Imperial War Museum, the Ashcroft collection went on public display alongside the museum's Victoria and George Cross collection in November 2010. It was announced that the Lord Ashcroft Gallery will close from 1 June 2025 (collection to be returned to Lord Ashcroft).

Prior to the November 2010 opening of the Ashcroft Gallery, the largest collection of VCs on public display was held by the Australian War Memorial, whose collection includes all nine VCs awarded to Australians at Gallipoli. Of the 101 medals awarded to Australians (96 VCs, and five VCs for Australia), this collection contains around 70 medals, including three medals awarded to British soldiers (Grady, 1854; Holbrook, 1914; and Whirlpool, 1858), and three of the VCs for Australia (Donaldson, 2008; Keighran, 2010; and Roberts-Smith, 2010).

Museums with holdings of ten or more VCs include:

In the UK
Museum	Location	Number of VCs
Lord Ashcroft Gallery, Imperial War Museum	North Lambeth, London	210
The National Army Museum	Chelsea, London	39
The Rifleman's Museum	Winchester, Hampshire	34
The Royal Engineers Museum	Gillingham, Kent	26
The Museum of Military Medicine	Mytchett, Surrey	22
The Royal Artillery Museum	Woolwich, London	20
The Highlanders' Museum (Queen's Own Highlanders Collection)	Fort George, Inverness-shire	16
The Regimental Museum of The Royal Welsh	Brecon, Wales	16
The Green Howards Regimental Museum	Richmond, Yorkshire	15
The Fusilier Museum	Tower of London	12
The Gordon Highlanders Museum	Aberdeen	12
The National Maritime Museum	Greenwich, London	11
The National War Museum	Edinburgh Castle	11
The Royal Air Force Museum	Hendon, London	11
The Sherwood Foresters Museum	Nottingham	11
The Gurkha Museum	Winchester, Hampshire	10
The Royal Marines Museum	Portsmouth, Hampshire	10
The Royal Welch Fusiliers Museum	Caernarfon Castle, Wales	10

Outside the UK
Museum	Location	Number of VCs
Australian War Memorial	Canberra, Australia	~70 (Note: In May 2014, the AWM website listed 69 medals, including three VCs for Australia)
Canadian War Museum	Ottawa, Ontario, Canada	39
National Army Museum	Waiouru, New Zealand	11

Many VCs are on loan to the museums and are owned by individuals and not owned by the museums themselves.

== Legacy ==
=== Memorials ===
In 2004, a national Victoria Cross and George Cross memorial was installed in Westminster Abbey close to the tomb of the Unknown Warrior. Westminster Abbey contains monuments and memorials to central figures in British history including Isaac Newton and Charles Darwin. One VC recipient, Lord Henry Percy, is buried within a family vault in the Abbey.

Canon William Lummis was a military historian who built up an archive on the service records and final resting places of Victoria Cross holders. This was then summarised into a pamphlet which was taken to be an authoritative source on these matters. However, Lummis was aware of short-comings in his own work and encouraged David Harvey to continue it. The result was Harvey's seminal book Monuments to Courage. In 2007 the Royal Mail used material from Lummis' archives to produce a collection of stamps commemorating Victoria Cross recipients.

It is a tradition within the Australian Army for soldiers' recreational clubs on military bases to be named after a particular recipient of the Victoria Cross. Australia has another unique means of remembering recipients of the Victoria Cross. Remembrance Drive is a path through city streets and highways linking Sydney and Canberra. Trees were planted in February 1954 by Queen Elizabeth II in a park near Sydney Harbour and at the Australian War Memorial in Canberra, marking either end of the route, with various plantations along the roadsides in memory of the fallen. Beginning in 1995, 23 rest stop memorials named for Australian recipients of the VC from World War II onwards have been sited along the route, providing picnic facilities and public amenities to encourage drivers to take a break on long drives. 23 of the 26 memorial sites have been dedicated, with a further three reserved for the surviving VC recipients, including two of the newer Victoria Cross for Australia awards. Edward Kenna was honoured with the most recent rest stop on 16 August 2012, having died in 2009.

Valour Road is a residential street in the city of Winnipeg, Canada named in honour of three World War I recipients of the Victoria Cross who lived in the same block of that street. The story is also commemorated in a sixty-second short film commonly seen on Canadian television.

=== In art ===
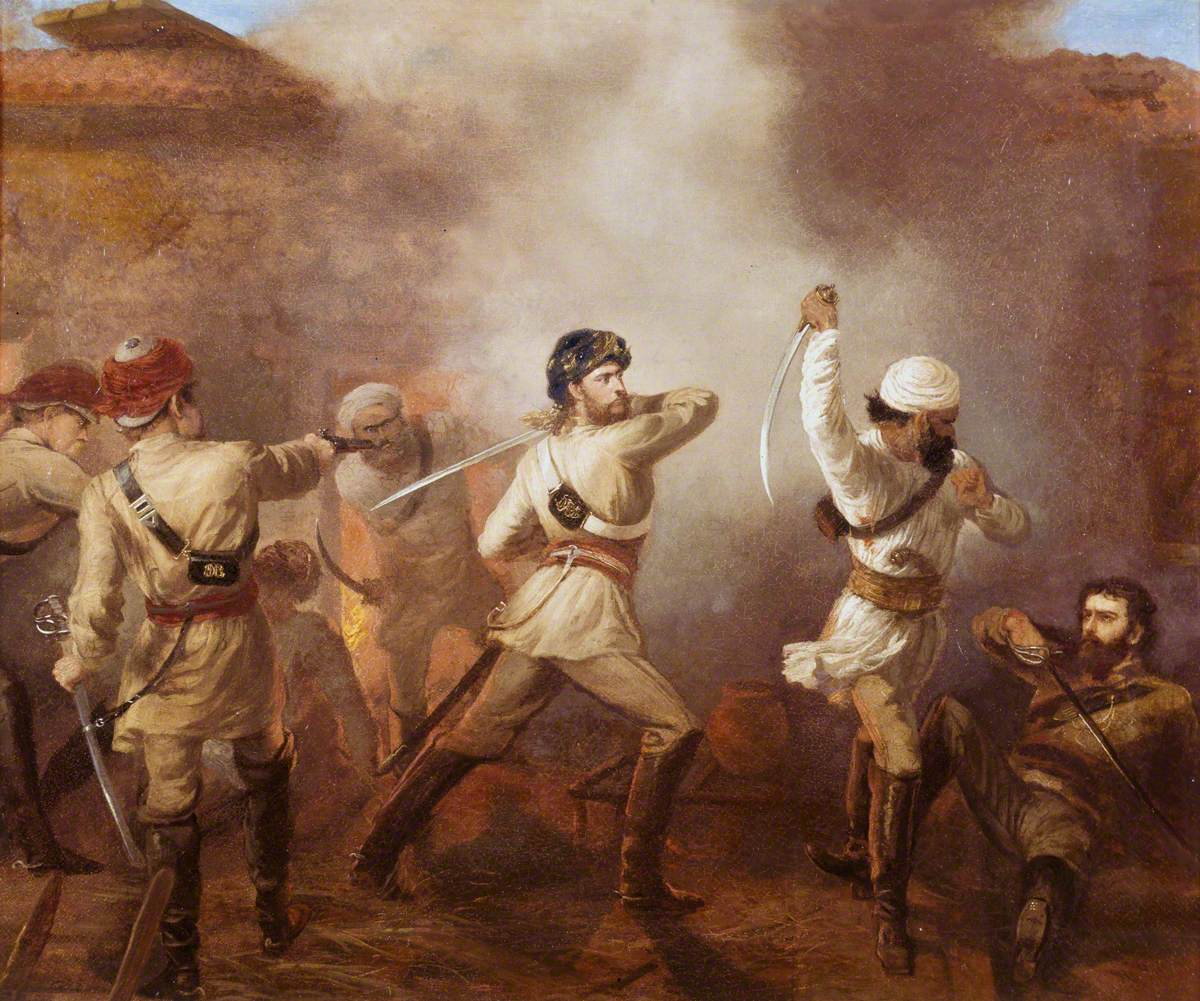
1860 painting by Louis William Desanges of C. J. S. Gough winning his VC at the Siege of Lucknow

The subject of soldiers earning the VC has been popular with artists since the medal's inception. Notable are the fifty paintings by Louis William Desanges that were painted in the late 1850s and early 1860s. Many of these were exhibited at the Egyptian Gallery in Piccadilly, but in 1900, they were brought together by Lord Wantage as the Victoria Cross Gallery and exhibited in the town of Wantage, at that time in Berkshire. Later, the collection was broken up and many of the paintings were sent to the various regiments depicted. Some were damaged or destroyed. A number of the acts were also portrayed in a Second World War propaganda pamphlet, and the images commissioned by the Ministry of Information are presented in an online gallery available on the website of The National Archives. In 2016, portrait photographer Rory Lewis was commissioned by the Victoria Cross and George Cross Association to hold portrait sittings with all living recipients of the Victoria Cross and the George Cross.

== See also ==
- List of military actions for which a Victoria Cross was awarded
- Dickin Medal (The animals' VC)
