= Lordship of Gödens =

Lordship of Gödens Herrlichkeit Gödens (German)
- Lordship of East Frisia
- 1495–1807
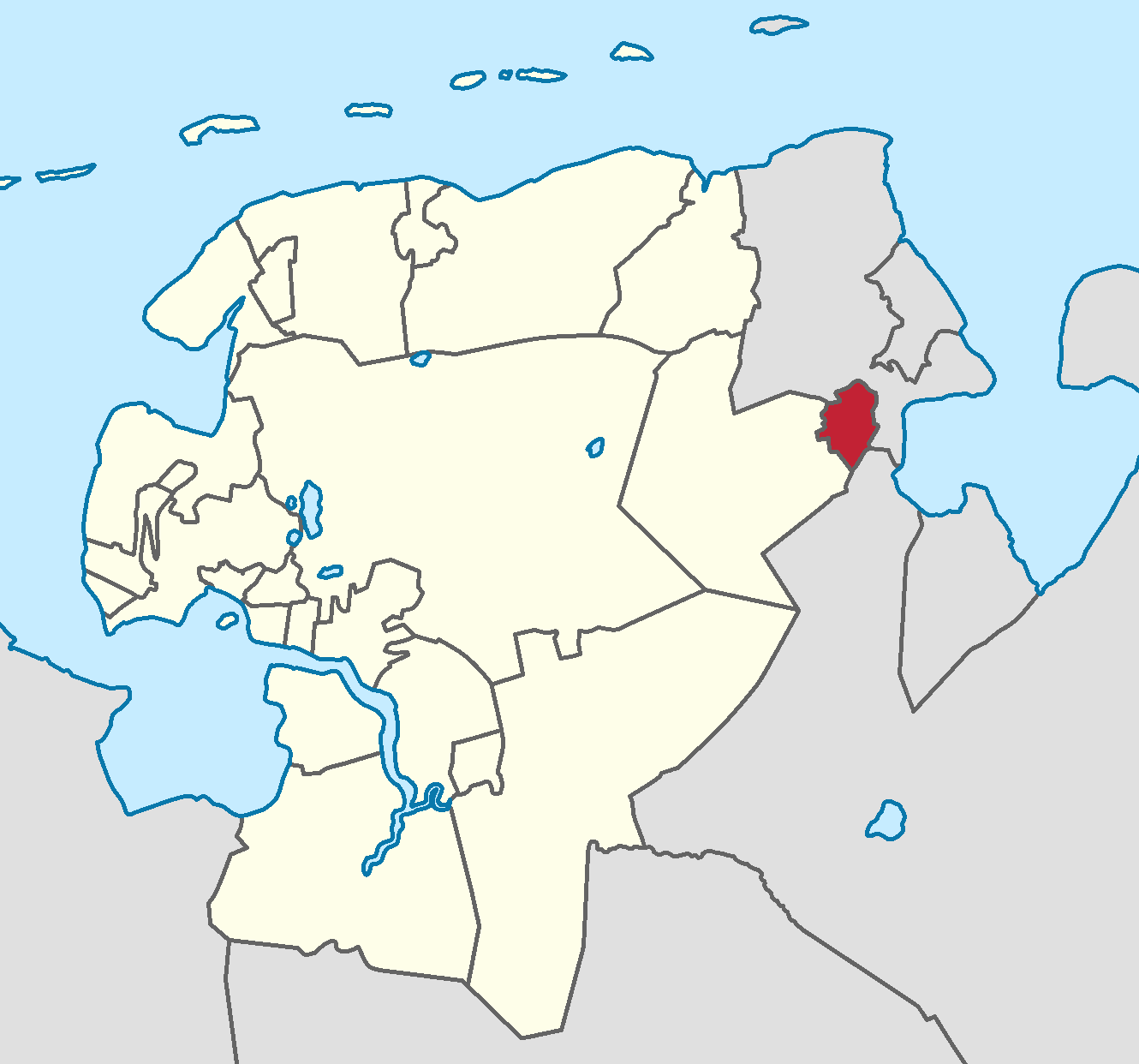
- The Lordship of Gödens (red), within the County of East Frisia (beige) in the year 1728
- Capital: Gödens
- History
  - Established: 1495
  - Disestablished: 1807
| Preceded by | Succeeded by |
| Östringen (Gau) | Kingdom of Holland |
- Today part of: Germany

The Lordship of Gödens (German: Herrlichkeit Gödens) was a lordship in the east of the East Frisian peninsula and it belonged to the County of East Frisia. It bordered the County of Oldenburg to the southeast and the Lordship of Jever to the northeast. The parishes of Altgödens and Dykhausen belonged to the Lordship of Gödens. The ancestral seat of the Lordship of Gödens was Gödens Castle. The Lordship existed until 1839 and was then added to the then newly formed Friedeburg office.

The Lordship of Gödens is known above all as a place of religious diversity. In the largest town of the lordship, Neustadtgödens, five churches were built within just fifty years, despite only having around 800 inhabitants. In addition to the originally Reformed inhabitants, people of Lutheran, Catholic, Mennonite and Jewish faith lived here.

== History ==
=== The chieftains of Gödens ===
The Lordship of Gödens goes back to a chieftaincy. The first chieftain of Gödens was Edo Boing (1430–1481). He first appeared in connection with Gödens by name in 1451 and signed a document in 1454 as the 'Hovetling of Gödens'. The ancestral seat of the first chieftains of Gödens was Altgödens Castle. Edo Boings lived in constant hostility with the chieftains of Jever, although Gödens was still formally under the rule of Jever at that time. His daughter Almut Boing (1454–1520) married Hicko of Oldersum (1450–1527) in 1480, who became the second Lord of Gödens. In 1495 he defected from the rule of Jever to the County of East Frisia and placed himself under the command of Count Edzard the Great of East Frisia. The Jever chief Edo Wiemken the Younger resisted this development, but was ultimately unable to reverse it.

=== Economic development ===
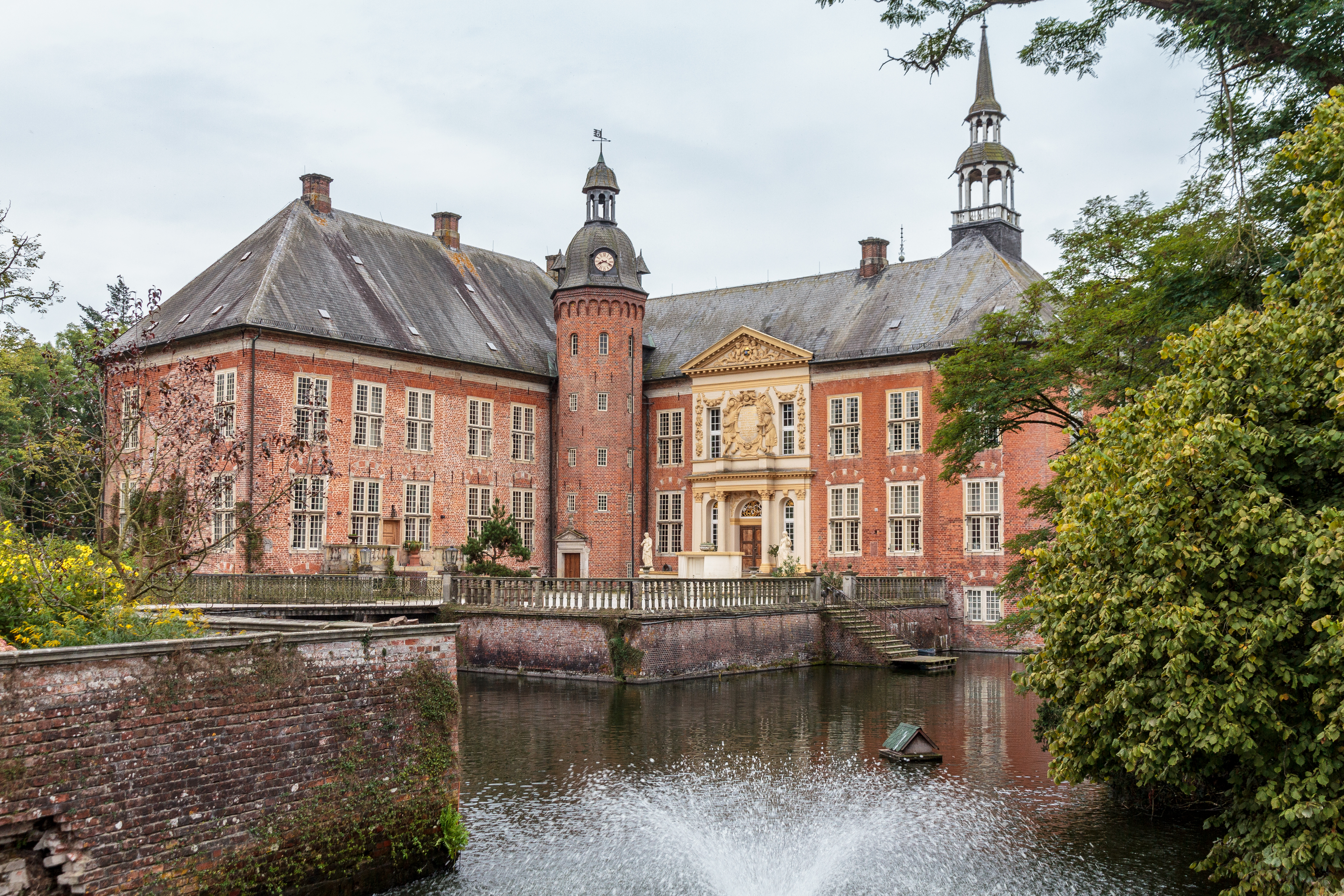
Gödens Castle

The ancestral seat of the Gödens chiefs in Altgödens was destroyed during the Saxon feud in 1514. Therefore, Hicko von Oldersum and his son Haro built a two-winged moated castle on a new site by 1517. Haro von Oldersum (1485–1539) became Lord of Oldersum and Gödens after the death of his father and married Hebrich von Inn- und Kniphausen in 1527. She is considered the founder of the town of Neustadtgödens, which was created as a new town in 1544 through embankment measures and the construction of a sluice on the Schwarzer Brack. Hebrich also determined Calvinism as the dominant religion in the Lordship of Gödens as early as the 1530s. By 1550, other residents had settled at the Neustädter Siel. Many of them were specifically recruited Dutch skilled workers. A large sluice port was built and trade relations developed with Emden, Amsterdam, Bremen, Hamburg and as far as the Baltic Sea. The imposition of customs duties on imported goods gave the Lord of Gödens a new source of income.

=== Gödens under the Frydag dynasty ===
During the next two generations, the Lordship of Gödens was passed on through clever marriages. In 1555, Haro von Oldersum's daughter Almut von Oldersum (1530–1557) married the nobleman Johann von Oldenbokum from the county of Mark. This marriage produced a daughter, Almut von Oldenbokum (1557–1601), who in 1574 married Franz von Frydag vom Loringhove from Westphalia. The economic boom increased under both lords. However, this ended after the construction of the Ellenser Dam, which was built between 1597 and 1615 by the Oldenburg counts Johann VII and Anton Günther. This dam cut Neustadtgödens off from direct access to the sea. The ships had to reach the sluice harbour, which was now located inland, via the Neustädter Tief. Only through negotiations before the Reichskammergericht in Speyer were concessions wrested from the Oldenburg side that favored the further development of the town. Lord Haro von Frydag (1578–1637) managed to ensure that ships from Neustadtgödens could pass the Ellenser Damm duty-free after the dyke was closed.

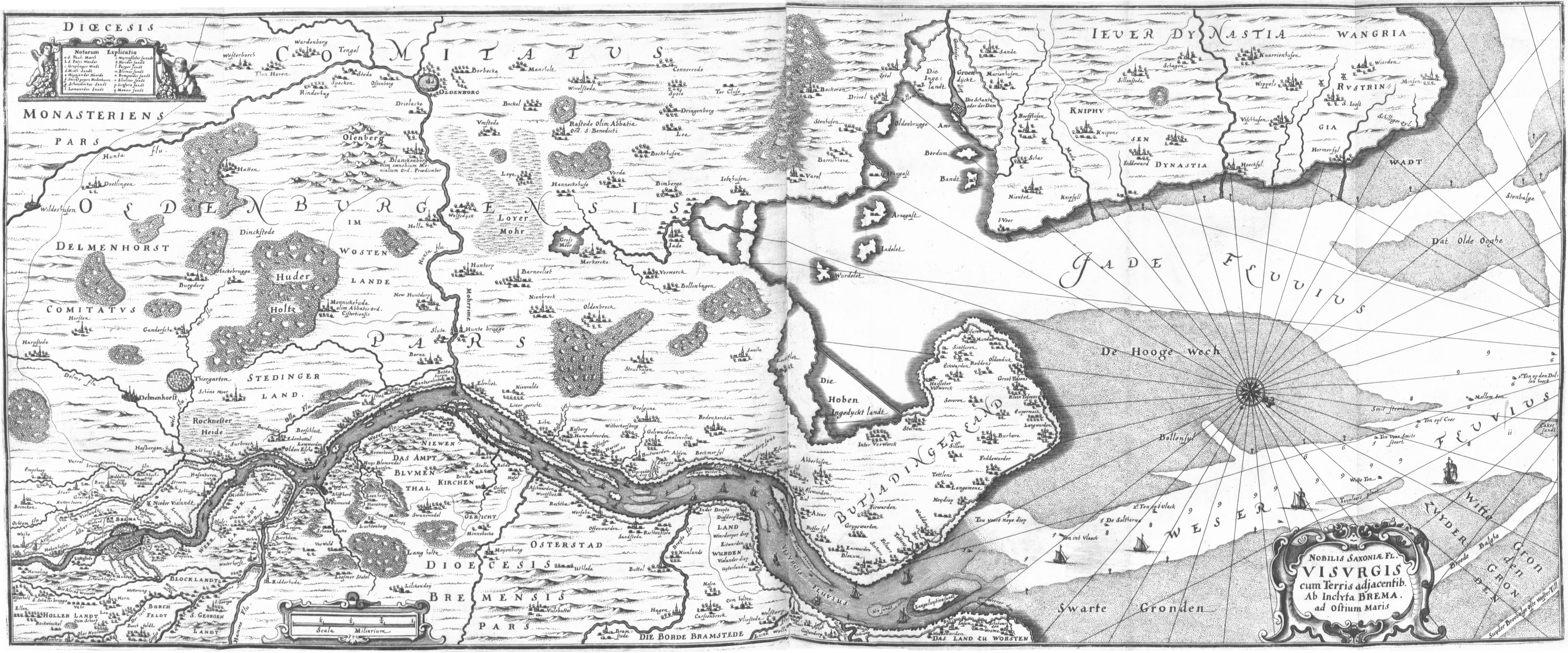
The Jade Bay around 1643, the rampart at Ellenser Damm is marked

After the construction of the Ellenser Dam, the residents turned primarily to trade and weaving. After the Thirty Years' War (1618–1648), there was an increased settlement of Mennonite linen weavers from Holland, Leer and Emden. Large bleaching meadows were created on the outskirts of the town for bleaching the woven fabrics. From 1660 onwards, the first Jews were also able to settle in the Lordship of Gödens. Both religious communities received letters of protection from the Lord of Gödens. This gave the Lordship of Gödens a new source of income, as the religious refugees had to buy the protection of the rulers. In 1669, a fire destroyed large parts of the castle in Gödens, but just two years later the castle was rebuilt in the Dutch Renaissance style. The moated castle is still considered one of the most beautiful moated castles in northwest Germany.

=== Increased status of the Lords of Gödens ===
In 1692, a generation later, the three secular sons Haro Burchard (1640–1692), Franz Heinrich (1643–1694) and Carl Philip (1644–1699) were raised to the hereditary rank of count by Emperor Leopold I. The other three sons held clerical offices. Thanks to their mother Margarethe Elisabeth, they all received a good Catholic education. They traveled to the most important countries in Europe and studied at good universities. The two eldest sons later made careers at the emperor's court.

In 1694, Franz Heinrich von Frydag's son Burchard Philipp von Frydag (1685–1746) inherited the lordship and took over the regency. He was in the service of the Emperor in Vienna. As Minister of Finance and legal advisor, he was an influential man, constantly active at the Emperor's court in Vienna and very rarely seen in the lordship in this capacity. The administration of the lordship was the responsibility of his sister-in-law Charlotte Countess von Bielcke, the sister of his wife Edel Augusta Countess von Bielcke (1692–1762), whom he had married in 1708. With the help of successful rent collectors, the lordship was managed economically successfully despite the absence of the sovereign.

=== The Wedel-Jarlsberg family ===
After the death of the childless Prince Charles Edzard of East Frisia, the County of East Frisia fell to Prussia in 1744. The Prussians' repressive trade policy from then on led to the economic decline of the linen weaving industry in Neustadtgödens in particular. Count Burchard Philipp von Frydag died in 1746. Since he also remained childless, ownership of the lordship passed to his nephew Anton Franz Freiherr von Wedel (1707–1788), the son of his sister Maria Juliana (1684–1727), married to Baron Erhard Friedrich von Wedel-Jarlsberg zu Evenburg (1668–1740). In 1776, he was raised to the hereditary rank of count by the Prussian King Frederick the Great in gratitude for the help he played in the seizure of East Frisia by the Prussians. A Count of Wedel still owns Gödens Castle today.

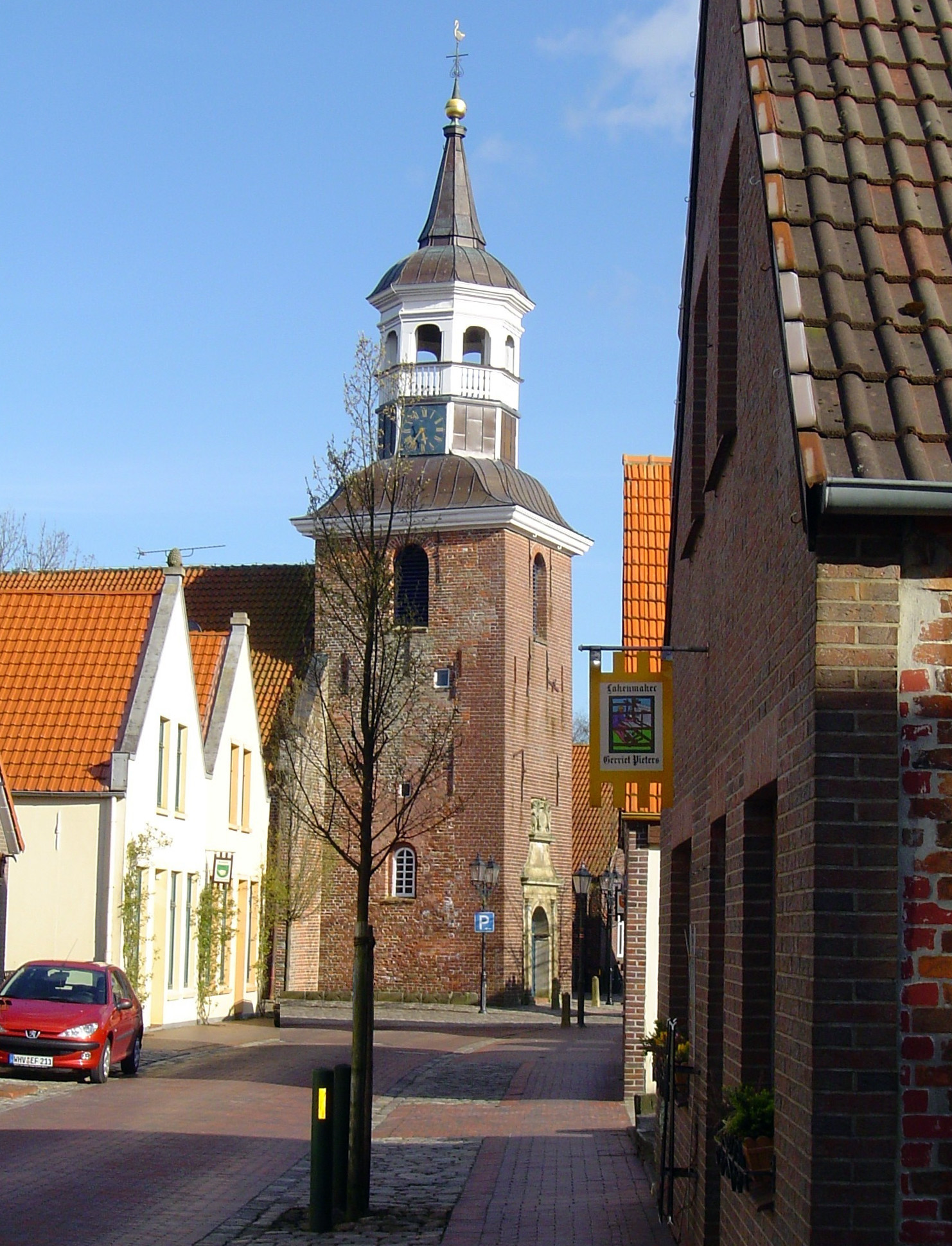
The Lutheran Church

== Religion ==
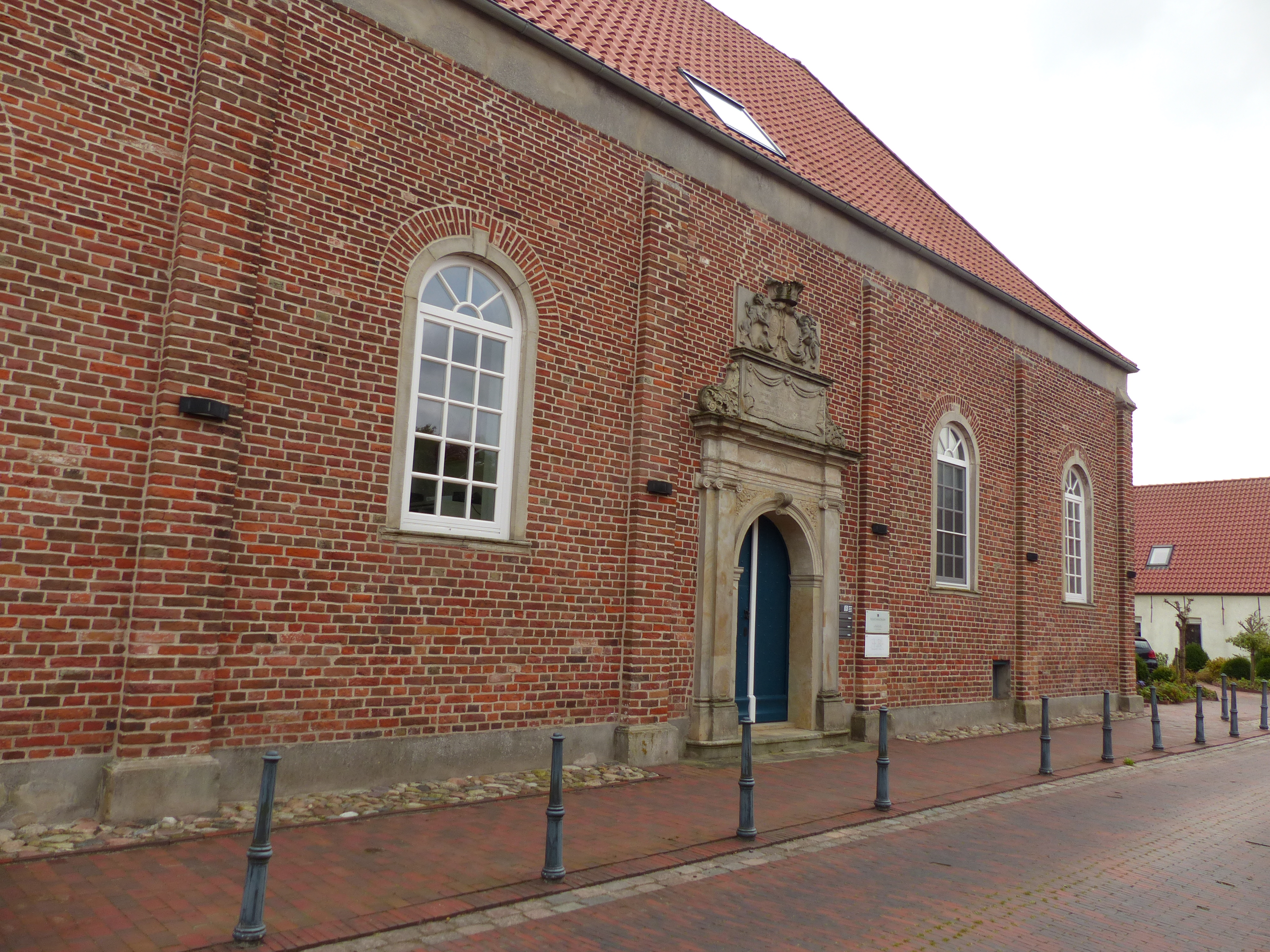
The Calvinist Church

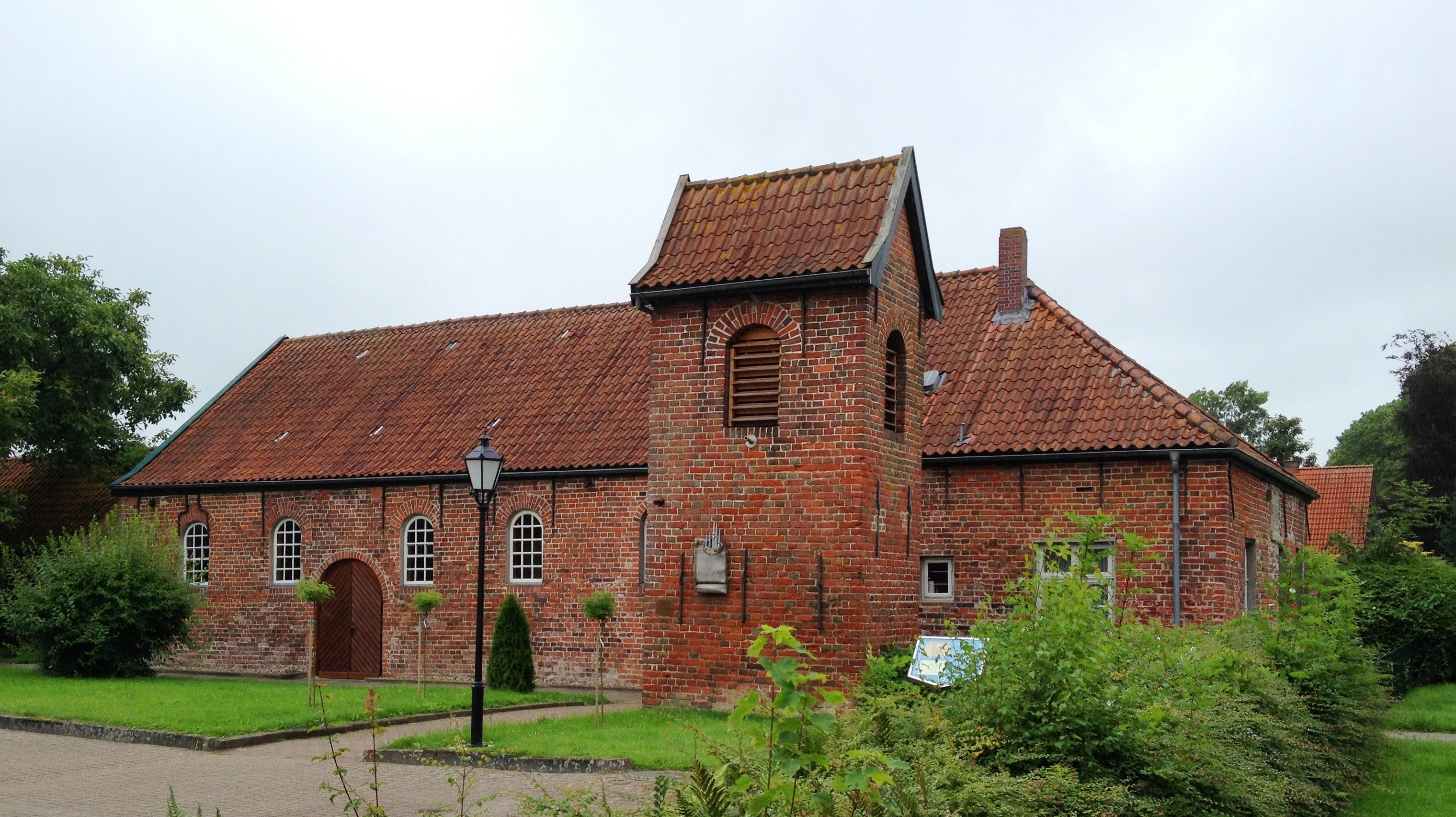
The Catholic Church

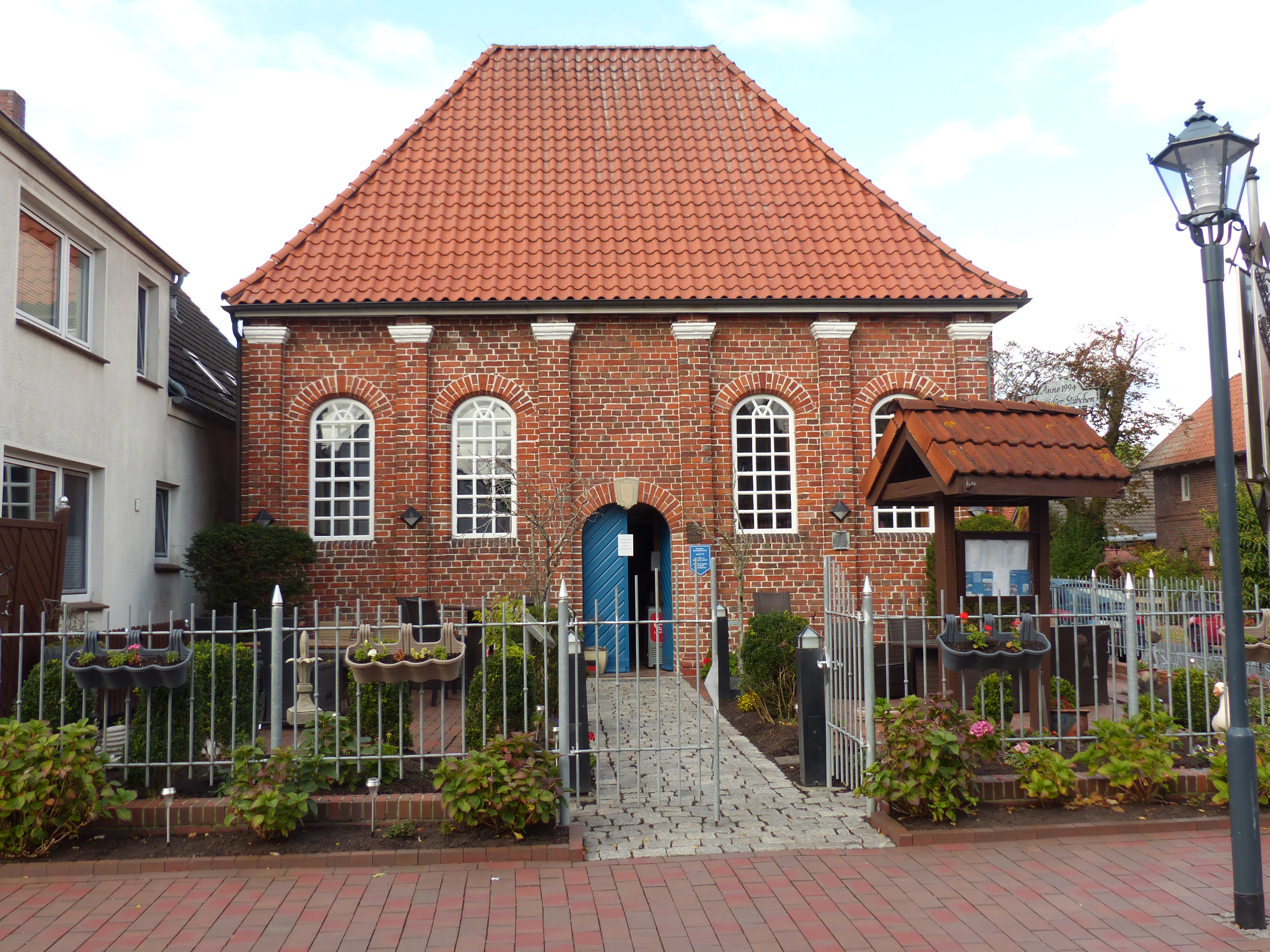
The Mennonite Church

In 1558, the Lords of Gödens banned the public practice of other religions by an edict. All residents were formally forced to adopt the Reformed faith. Baptisms, weddings and funerals had to be held for a fee in the only Reformed church in Dykhausen. Members of other denominations could only hold their services privately at home or had to go to the neighboring churches in Sande, Horsten or Zetel. In 1639, the Reformed Baron Franz Ico von Frydag married the wealthy Catholic Margarethe Elisabeth von Westerholt from Gelderland (1618–1680). This marked the beginning of a period of unusual religious tolerance in the Lordship of Gödens. Franz Ico allowed his wife to practice her Catholic faith in Gödens Castle and gave his children the freedom to choose their religion.

In 1692, the first-born son Haro Burchard von Frydag died and his brother Franz Heinrich von Frydag took over the rule. He appointed the Jesuit Father Petrus Fleurque in Neustadtgödens, who set up the first Catholic mission in the otherwise Protestant north. In 1680, Franz Heinrich von Frydag married the equally wealthy Sophia Elisabeth Countess of Aldenburg (1661–1730), a daughter of the Imperial Count Anton I of Aldenburg and granddaughter of Count Anton Günther of Oldenburg. She was of the Lutheran faith and supported the inhabitants of the Lordship of Gödens who shared the same denomination. The Peace of Augsburg of 1555 stipulated that the respective rulers had the right to determine the religion of all inhabitants of their territory. In East Frisia, however, the right was not exercised directly by the counts and princes, but passed to the individual lords, who determined in their lordships which religion applied to the respective area. Despite this right, the Lords of Gödens allowed the Lutherans, as the largest religious community in the Lordship of Gödens, to build their own church. This was inaugurated in 1695.

In 1708, Count Burchard Philipp von Frydag allowed the Jewish community of Neustadtgödens to bury their dead in their own cemetery on the road from Neustadtgödens to Gödens Castle. At the same time, they were given permission to build a synagogue in Neustadtgödens, which was first mentioned in 1752. The other denominations were also allowed to practice their religion more freely. The Reformed Church was the second religious community to receive permission to build its own church. Just one year later, the Catholic community was also allowed to build its own place of worship. The Catholic St. Joseph's Church was the first post-Reformation church of this denomination on the East Frisian peninsula. In 1741, the fourth church building in Neustadtgödens was completed with the construction of the Mennonite Church. Now all four Christian denominations had their own church building.

== See also ==
- East Frisia
- East Frisia (peninsula)
- County of East Frisia
- History of East Frisia

== Literature ==
- Werner Brune (Hrsg.): Wilhelmshavener Heimatlexikon. 3 Bände. Brune Druck- und Verlagsgesellschaft, Wilhelmshaven 1986
- Ingeborg Nöldeke: Boing-Oldersum-Oldenbokum-Frydag-Wedel – Die Besitzer der Herrlichkeit Gödens zwischen 1430 und 1788 (Stammtafel)
