= Saxon feud =

1514–1517 war fought in the Low Countries

- Part of the Guelders Wars
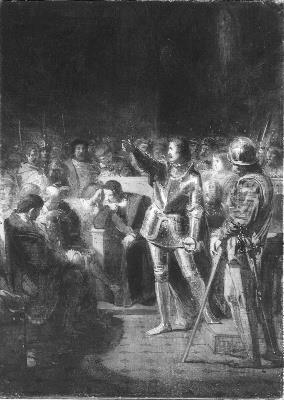
- "Anno 1514: Count Edzard defends his rights in the Groningen city council" (19th-century painting by Johannes Hinderikus Egenberger)
| Date | (1498) 1514 – 1517 |
| Location | Friesland, Groningen, East Frisia, Jeverland, Wesermarsch |
| Result | Compromise: Imperial ban on Edzard lifted |
| Territorial changes | Habsburg nominally gains Friesland, Groningen & Ommelanden; East Frisia nominally gains the Lordships of Esens, Stedesdorf and Wittmund and Lordship of Jever; East Frisia cedes Friesische Wehde to Oldenburg |

Belligerents
| Meissen (1514–15); Frisia; Bentheim-Steinfurt; Habsburg Netherlands (1515–17); County of Oldenburg; Brunswick-Lüneburg; Lüneburg; Wolfenbüttel; Calenberg; Grubenhagen; Minden; Hohenstein; Stolberg; Esens, Stedesdorf and Wittmund; Jever | East Frisia Groningen; Ommelanden; Frisian rebels | Guelders; Zutphen Supported by: France |

Commanders and leaders
| George I Eberwin II Charles V John V Henry I Henry IV †; Henry V Eric I Philip I Francis I Ernst V John III; Bodo III Hero I Christoph I | Edzard I; Ulrich I; Hicko I; Folef I; Jancko Douwama; Grutte Pier; Grutte Wierd | Charles II |

The Saxon feud (Dutch: Saksische Vete; Frisian: Saksyske Skeel; German: Säschische Fehde) was a military conflict in the years 1514–1517 between the East Frisian Count Edzard I, 'West Frisian' rebels, the city of Groningen, and Charles II, Duke of Guelders on the one hand and the Imperial Frisian hereditary governor George, Duke of Saxony – replaced by Charles V of Habsburg in 1515 – and 24 German princes. The war took place predominantly on East Frisian soil and destroyed large parts of the region.

The origins of the feud can be traced back to 1498, when George's father Albert III was appointed hereditary governor of 'the Frisian lands' by Charles V's grandfather Emperor Maximilian I. Though appointed governor of 'the Frisian lands', Albert and his sons and successors Henry and George first had to conquer these lands while facing resistance from the population, first the 'West Frisians' (living in modern Friesland) who were loosely organised into rebel groups. The conflict broadened when George crossed the river Lauwers in 1514, entering the Ommelanden and laying siege to the city of Groningen, which called in the help of Edzard of East Frisia and Charles of Guelders. George's overlord Maximilian was already busy fighting Guelders elsewhere, so instead of taking on East Frisia himself, he imposed the Imperial ban on Edzard, after which 24 German princes invaded East Frisia, most notably John V, Count of Oldenburg. In 1515, George gave up fighting and sold his rights to the Frisian lands to Charles V, who in 1517 reached a compromise peace with Edzard, who managed to stand his ground remarkably well against the two dozen invaders.

== Background ==
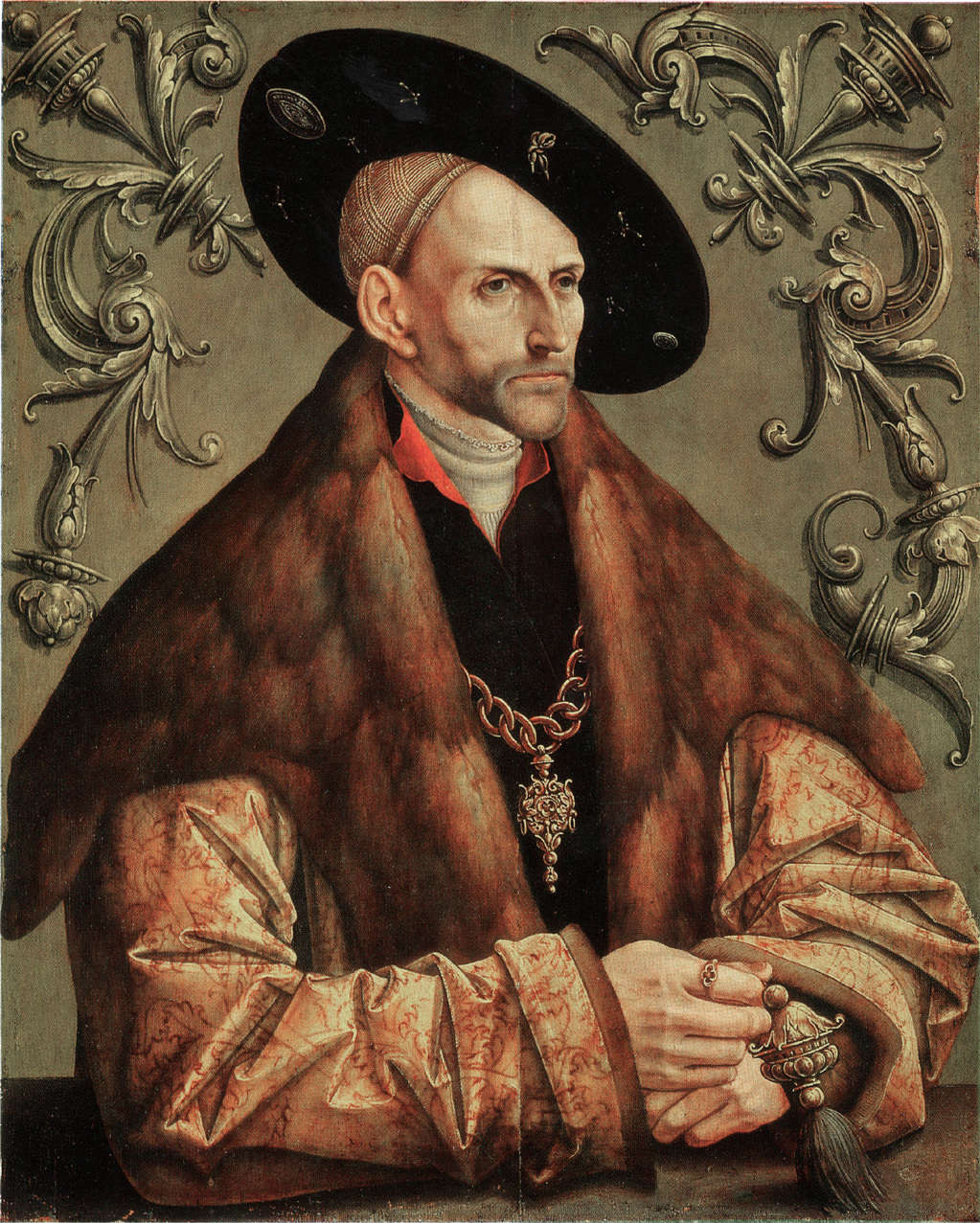
Count Edzard I around 1520/1530. Painting by Jacob Cornelisz van Oostsanen.

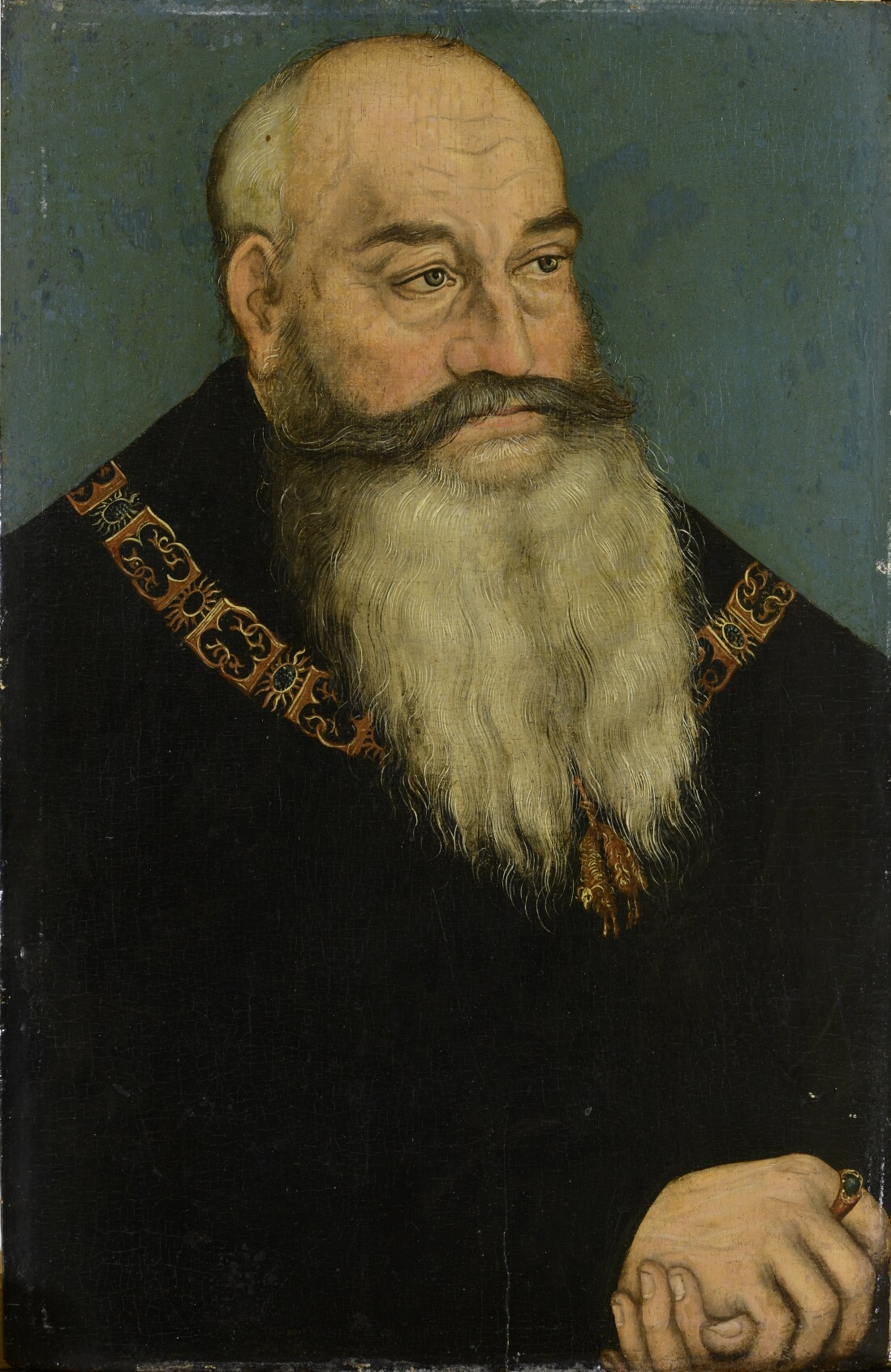
George the Bearded between 1534 and 1539. School of Lucas Cranach the Elder.

In 1488 Duke Albert III "the Bold" of Saxony, the Margrave of Meissen, campaigned against the rebellious Flanders, aiming to liberate Emperor Maximilian I, who was held prisoner by the citizens of Bruges. As a reward, Maximilian I appointed Albert III governor of the Netherlands and, as compensation for the cost incurred, Albert was appointed in 1498 as hereditary governor of Frisia, with an understanding that he'd have to subdue Frisia by force of arms before he could take up this post. After subduing the Frisians, Albert III rushed to Leipzig to attend the Diet, the Frisians revolted and laid siege to Franeker, where Albert's second son, Henry had taken up the post of governor. Albert rushed back to Frisia and freed Henry. He then conquered Groningen before dying in Emden on 12 September 1500. Henry inherited the post of governor of Frisia. However, the Frisians kept resisting his rule and he resigned on 30 May 1505 in favour of his brother George, in exchange for two districts in the Ore Mountains.

== Outbreak of the feud ==
Duke George of Saxony demanded in 1504 that all cities and districts in Frisia pay homage to him as "eternal governor". The City of Groningen refused. Count Edzard I attempted to use the situation to extend his domain into the province of Groningen and in 1505, he proclaimed himself "protector" of the city. Twenty-four dukes and counts took up arms against Edzard and invaded East Frisia and devastated large parts of his territory. Edzard received an imperial ban from the Emperor and was excommunicated by the Pope.

== Course of the feud ==
=== 1514 ===
Count John V of Oldenburg saw this as an opportunity to provide the county of Oldenburg with access to the North Sea. In 1514, he attacked the Frisians in the Butjadingen area, and finally defeated them in the Battle of Langwarden. Simultaneously, Duke Henry I of Brunswick-Wolfenbüttel invaded East Frisia with an army of 20,000 men. He besieged Fortress Leerort, which was only defended by a few peasants and soldiers. However, Henry I was killed on 23 June 1514 by a targeted gunshot. His troops were then without a leader and they withdrew from East Frisia.

John V, in cooperation with Hero Oomkens von Esens, captured the castle at Großsander. Hero moved on and destroyed all three castles in Dornum; Stickhausen Castle was thus lost. Edzard retreated, setting Meerhusen Abbey on fire to cover his retreat. The city of Aurich was besieged and destroyed by the fighting and pillaging troops.

On another front, the Commandery at Dünebroek was plundered by soldiers of the Black Guard. They went on to destroy Burmönken, Marienhafe, Leerhafe, and Rispel; Friedeburg surrendered. The castle at Altgödens was destroyed; Kniphausen Castle was captured. The Black Guard then attacked Oldersum. Their first attempt to capture the town, which was defended by Hicko of Oldersum and Ulrich of Dornum failed on 14 June 1514. A second attempt to capture the town failed on 16 August 1514.

=== 1515-1516 ===
In 1515, the tide turned in favor of Edzard I. He recaptured the castle at Großsander, while his liegeman Folef I of Inn- and Kniphausen managed to capture Fortress Gutzwarden in Butjadingen. Duke George of Saxony sold his governorship for 100000guilders to Duke Charles of Burgundy, who later became Emperor as Charles V. Nevertheless, the conflict continued until 1517. The sconce at Detern was lost in 1516.

=== 1517 ===
At the beginning of 1517, Edzard I managed to recapture Friedeburg castle. Charles V began his reign in the Netherlands. Charles V lifted the Imperial ban against Edzard and invested him with East Frisia, thereby ending the Saxon feud.

== Aftermath ==
Edzard was forced to vacate Groningen and to give up his expansionist plans. Domestically, he was busy trying to pacify the East Frisian chieftains. On 3 December 1517, Edzard concluded the Peace of Zetel with Duke Henry II of Brunswick-Wolfenbüttel and Count John V of Oldenburg, in which he ceded the "Frisian Forest" (German: Friesische Wehde, the area around Zetel, Driefel and Schweinebrück) to Oldenburg.

It was also agreed that East Frisia would inherit Jever. That is, Edzard's son, Enno II would marry Maria, the daughter of the Edo, who was the last Lord of Jever. Edo had no male heir and it was agreed that Maria's husband would inherit Jever after Edo's death. Enno II, however, broke his promise and East Frisia lost Jever forever. Maria never married and ruled Jever until her death. In her will, she bequeathed Jever to Count John VII of Oldenburg.

The city of Aurich was completely destroyed during the turmoil of the Saxon feud. After 1517, the city was rebuilt according to a plan, which was based on the fact that Aurich was an important livestock market. The livestock market was moved from the castle square to a newly created market square, which was unusually large for a city of that size and is still the central square in the today's city center.

The conflict between Edzard and Hero Oomkens continued until Hero died in 1522. The emperor had invested Edzard with the Lordships of Esens, Stedesdorf and Wittmund and Edzard tried to subdue it. However, due to well-constructed fortifications at Wittmund and Esens, he met with limited success.
