= Christopher, Count of Oldenburg =

German count and regent in eastern Denmark

Christopher
- Count of Oldenburg
- Born: c. 1504
- Died: 4 August 1566 (aged 61–62)
- Noble family: House of Oldenburg
- Father: John V, Count of Oldenburg
- Mother: Anna of Anhalt-Zerbst

Christopher, Count of Oldenburg (German: Christoph, Graf von Oldenburg) (c. 1504 – 4 August 1566) was a German count and regent in eastern Denmark between 1534–36 during the Count's Feud (Danish: Grevens Fejde) which was named after him.

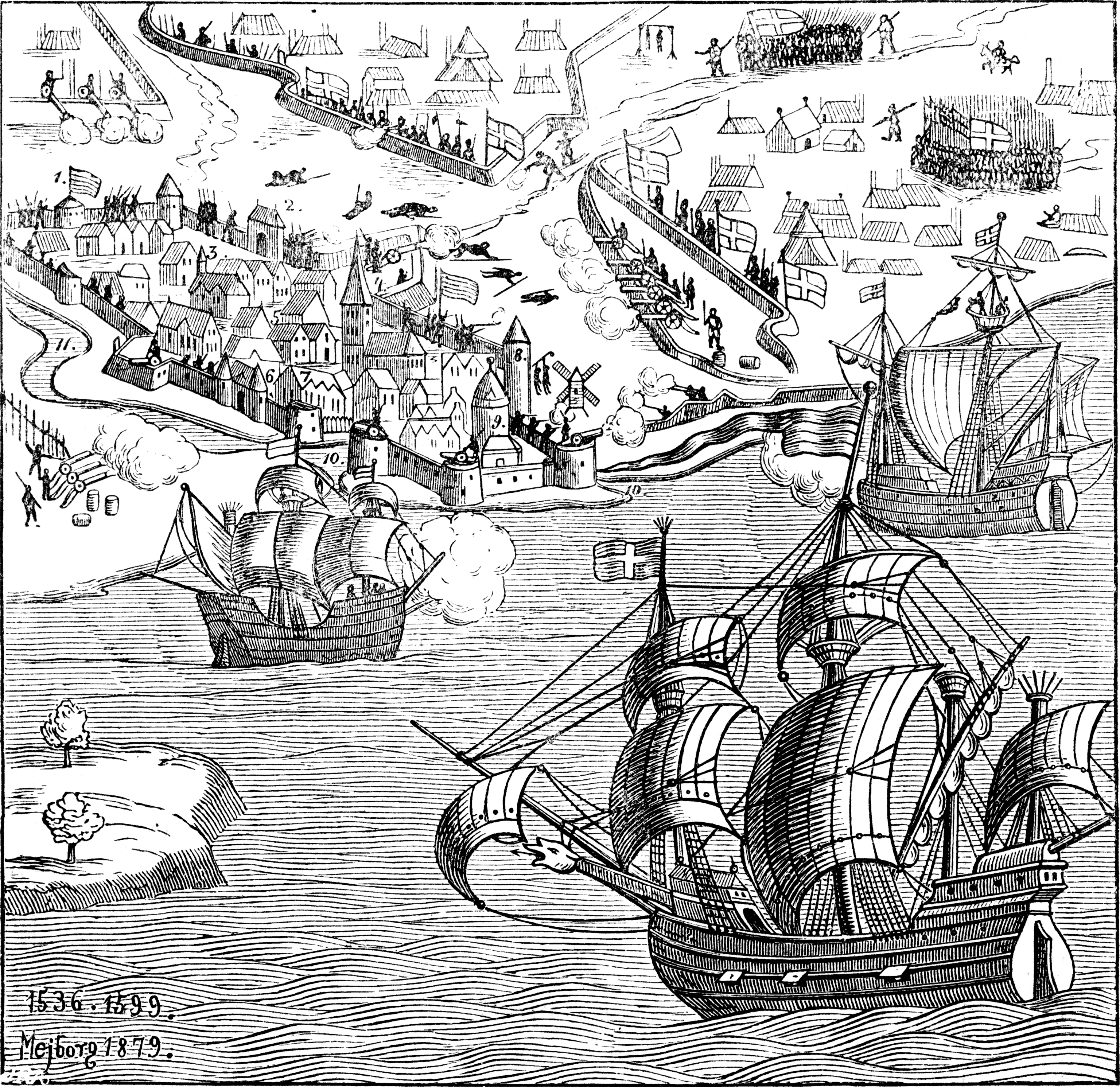
Siege of Copenhagen (1535-1536), woodcarving by Hermann Hamelmann (1903)

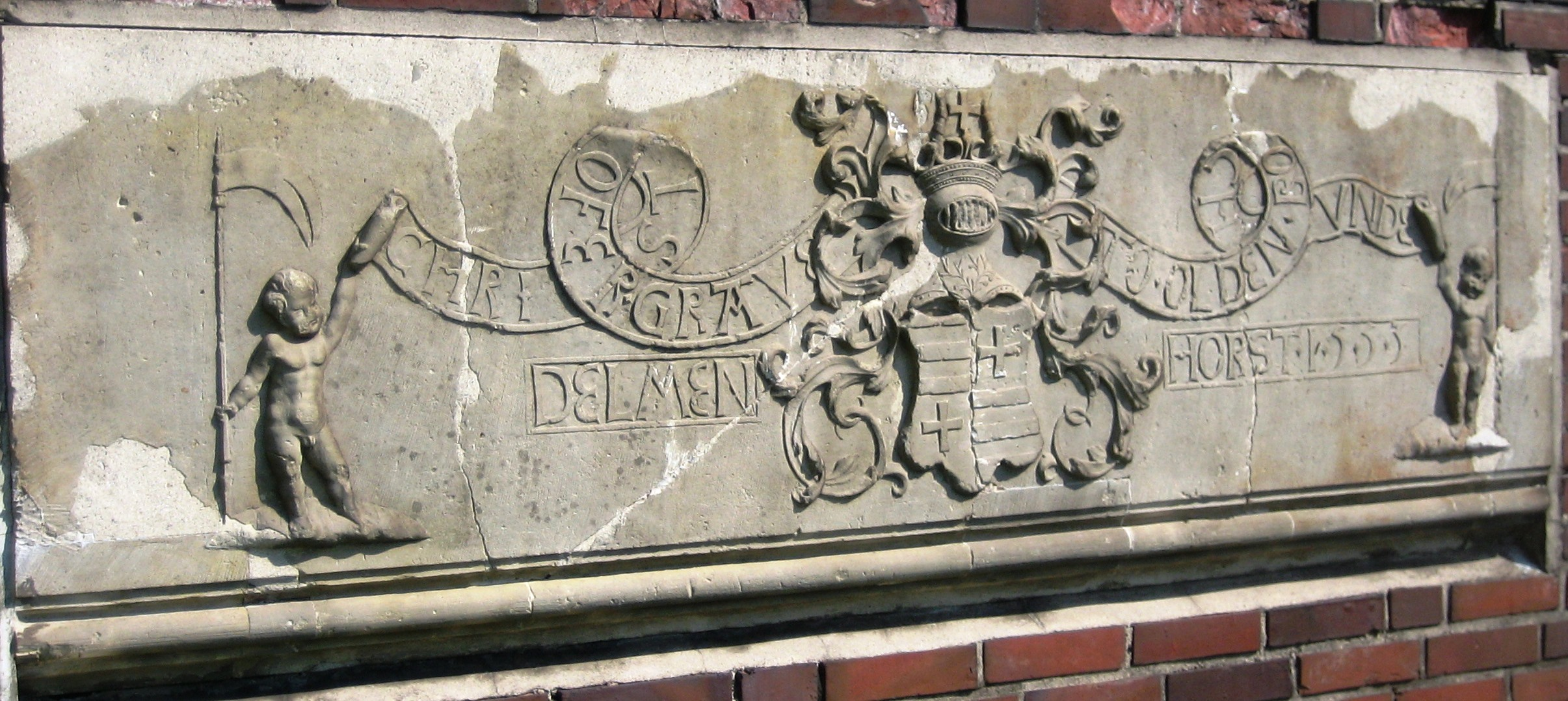
Coat of arms of Count Christopher of Oldenburg

== Biography ==
Christopher was the third son of Count Johan XIV of Oldenburg and Princess Anna of Anhalt-Zerbst. He was the grandson of Gerhard of Oldenburg who was a brother of King Christian I of Denmark. As a young man he was educated a clergyman but probably because of economic problems he later on chose a military career participating in wars in Germany. He stayed in Cologne from 1517 to 1524 with small interruptions, where he closely examined the Reformation leaning of Count Hermann of Wied, Archbishop-Elector of Cologne. He was described an "intellectual condottiere" possessing a classic Greek knowledge but apparently no great military talent.

As a second cousin of both Christian II and Christian III he took interest in Scandinavian politics. When the civil war broke out in Denmark 1534 after the death of Frederick I Christopher, who had converted to Protestantism, was hired by Lübeck as the military leader of the alliance of Danish commoners, Lübeck and Protestants against Christian III and the Danish nobility. The formal purpose of this alliance was the restoration of Christian II. Christopher's own zeal seems to have been on behalf of the Danish crown.

After a promising start in which he became the master of Zealand and Scania with the title of a regent and conquered Funen, he had severe setbacks and quarrelled with his allies. Furthermore, Lübeck involved Albrecht VII of Mecklenburg-Güstrow in the alliance offering him the Danish crown which created jealousy between the two war lords. Christian III's conquest of both Jutland and Funen and the defection of Scania meant the breakdown of Christopher's position and he was besieged in Copenhagen 1535–36 together with his rival Albrecht until their capitulation.

After his defeat he returned to Oldenburg but several times he intervened into wars and struggles in Northern Germany. Among other things, he planned an invasion in Sweden and supported the military alliance of Lutheran princes known as the Schmalkaldic League. During his last years he lived in a monastery.

== Other sources ==
- Dansk Biografisk Leksikon (in Danish), vol. 3, Copenh., DK, 1979.
- Bech, Svend Cedergreen (1963), Politikens Danmarkshistorie (in Danish), vol. 6, Copenh., DK.

Christopher, Count of Oldenburg House of Oldenburg Born: 1504 Died: 4 August 1566
Preceded by John V	Count of Oldenburg; 1526-1566 with his brothers George (1526-1529); John VI (1526-1529) and Anthony I (1526-1573)	Succeeded by Anthony I
