= John V of Oldenburg =

Count of Oldenburg (1500-1526)

John V
- Count of Oldenburg
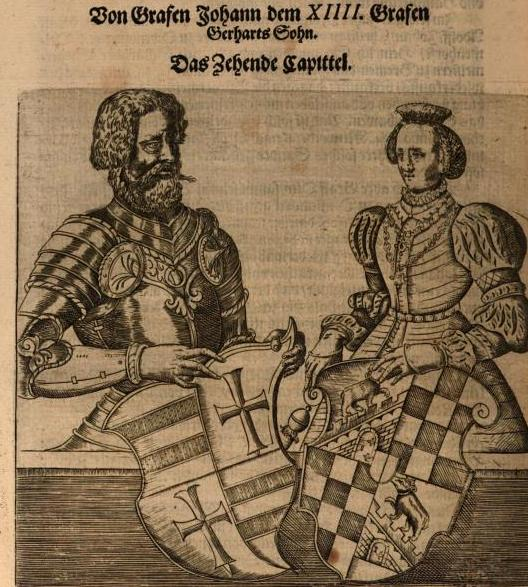
- Born: 1460; Oldenburg
- Died: 10 February 1526 (aged 65–66); Oldenburg
- Noble family: House of Oldenburg
- Spouse: Anna of Anhalt-Zerbst
- Father: Gerhard VI, Count of Oldenburg
- Mother: Adelheid of Tecklenburg

John V, Count of Oldenburg and Delmenhorst (also counted as John XIV, including also non-ruling namesake siblings; 1460, Oldenburg – 10 February 1526, Oldenburg) was a member of the House of Oldenburg. He was the ruling Count of Oldenburg from 1500 to 1526. His parents were Gerhard VI, Count of Oldenburg and Adelheid of Tecklenburg.

== Life ==
After his father resigned, John V prevailed against his brothers and became Count of Oldenburg. In his effort to become the ruling count John V invaded the Weser and North Sea marshes of Stadland and Butjadingen with mercenaries in April 1499, to both of which the Prince-Archbishopric of Bremen claimed its overlordship, in order to subject their free peasants. John had hired parts of the Black Guard, a free-lance troop of mercenaries, commanded by Ulrich von Dornum, who defeated the free peasants in two battles. Already in November Magnus of Saxe-Lauenburg, then regent in the Land of Hadeln, hired the Black Guard, too expensive for John, in order to conquer the Land of Wursten.

This was the start of a series of campaigns to subject the free peasants in the North Sea and river marshes to feudalism, to wit Altes Land, Ditmarsh, Land of Hadeln, Haseldorfer Marsch, Kehdingen, and Wilstermarsch, also known as the Elbe Marshes, Butjadingen and Stadland (today's Weser Marsh), as well as Stedingen, the Land of Würden, and the Land of Wursten. Bremen's prince-archbishop Johann Rode then tried to form a war alliance to repel John's and prevent further invasions, feared for the Land of Wursten, first gaining the cities of Bremen, Hamburg and Stade, which considered the areas downstream the rivers Elbe and Weser their own front yard existential for their free maritime trade connections. The free peasants in Stadland and Butjadingen liberated themselves from the Oldenburgian yoke in April 1500, supported by East Frisia.

John V could keep his external opponent, Edzard I, Count of East Frisia in check through alliances. During the Saxon feud, he and the united Dukes of Brunswick-Lüneburg attacked Edzard in January 1514. He was then able to conquer Butjadingen and Stadland and parts of the Frisian Wehde. He tried to keep the Stadland area with Esenshamm and Abbehausen as allodial property. However, in 1517, he had to accept them as fiefs from Henry V, Duke of Brunswick-Lüneburg. Initially, the dukes of Brunswick occupied Butjadingen. However, after a failed peasants uprising in 1515, they gradually transferred ownership to John V, and by 1523, Butjadingen was definitely owned by Oldenburg.

John V died in 1526. After his death, his sons John VI, Christopher, George, and Anthony I ruled jointly.

== Issue ==
He married Anna of Anhalt-Zerbst, daughter of George I, Prince of Anhalt-Dessau. Their children were:

- Johann VI von Oldenburg
- Anna von Oldenburg
- Georg von Oldenburg
- Christoph von Oldenburg
- Anton I von Oldenburg
- Moritz von Oldenburg
- Margaretha von Oldenburg

== See also ==
- List of rulers of Oldenburg

== Notes ==
John V of Oldenburg House of Oldenburg Born: 1460 in Oldenburg in Oldenburg Died: 10 February 1526 in Oldenburg (Olbg.)
Preceded by Adolphus	Count of Oldenburg; 1500–1526	Succeeded by John VI, George, Christopher and Anthony I
