= John VI of Oldenburg =

Co-Count of Oldenburg

John VI
- Count of Oldenburg
- Born: 1501; Oldenburg
- Died: 1548 (aged 46–47); Bremen
- Noble family: House of Oldenburg
- Father: John V, Count of Oldenburg
- Mother: Anna of Anhalt-Bernburg

John VI, Count of Oldenburg (1501 in Oldenburg – 1548 in Bremen) was a Count of Oldenburg. He was the eldest son of John V, Count of Oldenburg and his wife, Anna of Anhalt-Bernburg. He was supposed to rule jointly with his younger brothers. However, his time in office was marked by conflicts between John VI and his co-rulers.

== Life ==
John V died in 1526 and his four sons, John VI, George, Christopher and Anthony I took up ruling the Count of Oldenburg jointly. Their relationship was tense from the start of their joint rule. John VI, George, Anna, and their mother remained Catholics, while Christopher and Anthony I chose the Lutheran faith. Furthermore, Christopher and Anthony I tried to improve relationships with neighbouring East Frisia with a double wedding. John VI and George opposed this wedding for dynastic reasons, since the Cirksena family ruling East Frisia had only been raised to imperial counts in 1464.

The conflict was resolved when Christopher and Anthony I forced John VI and George to abdicate in 1529. After his abdication, John VI tried to regain power. He was supported by Henry V, Duke of Brunswick-Lüneburg. In 1533, John VI was appointed co-ruler with limited responsibilities for a 10-year period.

John VI sued his brothers, demanding an equal share in power, or else a division of the county. In 1542, the case was settled out of court, with John accepting financial compensation while renouncing his claims to co-rulership. Contemporary sources do not provide information as to what happened to George.

John VI died in 1548 in Bremen. His widow was not a noblewoman, so children from this marriage (if any) would be unable to inherit the county. He probably married her after he had lost all hope of regaining power.

== See also ==
- List of rulers of Oldenburg

John VI of Oldenburg House of Oldenburg Born: 1501 Died: 1548
Preceded by John V	Count of Oldenburg; 1526–1529 with his brothers George (1526–1529); Christopher and (1526–1566); Anthony I (1526–1573)	Succeeded by Christopher and Anthony I
