= Anthony I of Oldenburg =

Count of Oldenburg-Delmenhorst (1531-1573)

Anthony I
- Count of Oldenburg
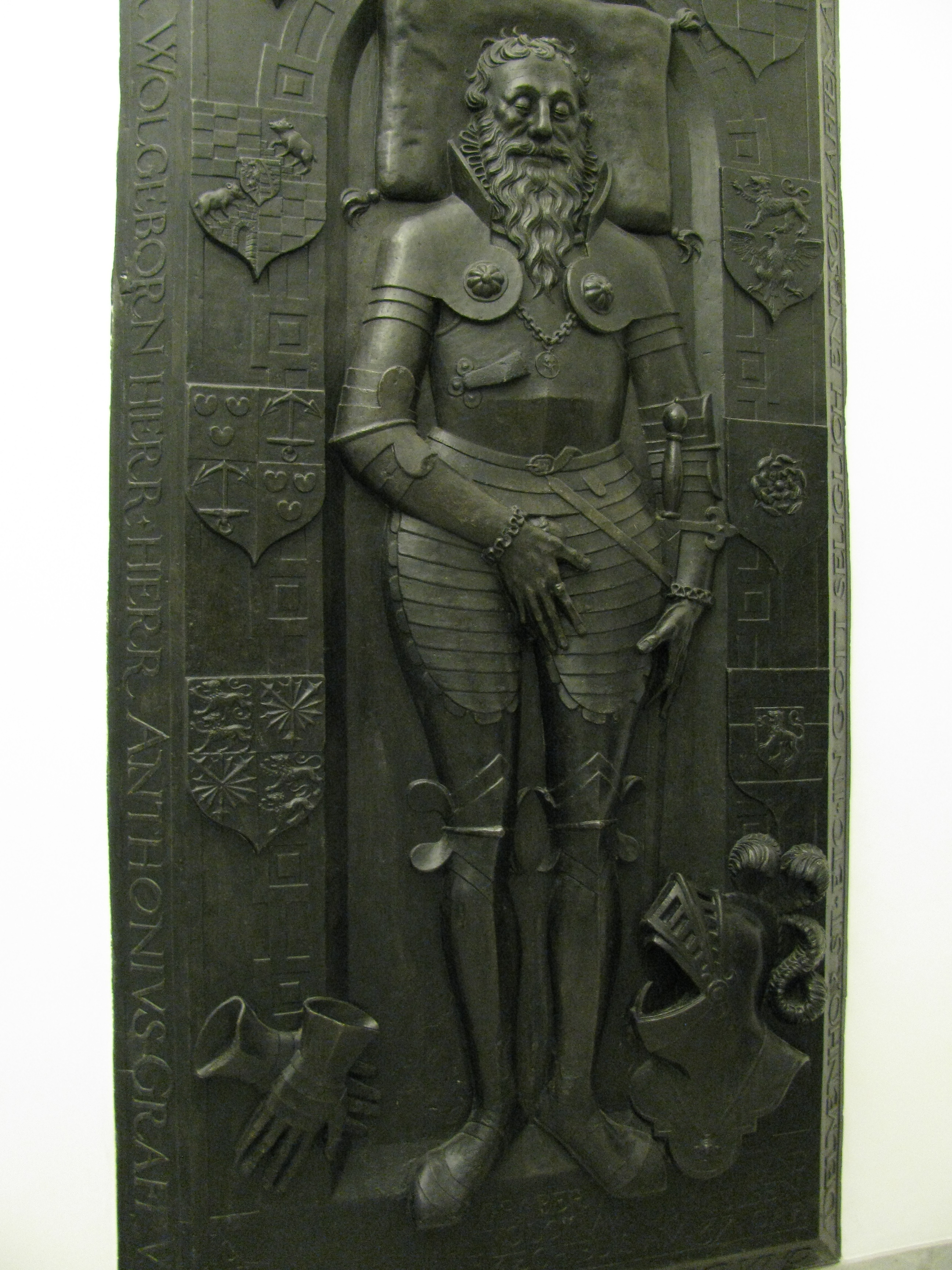
- Tomb effigy of Count Anthony I in St Lamberti Church, Oldenburg.
- Born: 1505
- Died: 22 January 1573 (aged 67–68); Oldenburg
- Noble family: House of Oldenburg
- Spouse: Sophie of Saxe-Lauenburg
- Issue: Catherine, Countess of Hoya; Anna, Countess of Schwarzburg-Sondershausen; John VII, Count of Oldenburg; Christian of Oldenburg; Clara of Oldenburg; Anthony II, Count of Oldenburg
- Father: John V, Count of Oldenburg
- Mother: Anna of Anhalt-Zerbst

Anthony I, Count of Oldenburg and Delmenhorst (1505 – 22 January 1573) was a member of the House of Oldenburg and was the Imperial Count of the Counties of Oldenburg and Delmenhorst within the Holy Roman Empire of German Nation. His parents were John V, Count of Oldenburg (1460–1525) and Anna of Anhalt-Zerbst.

== Life ==
Anthony I was the youngest son of John V. He had a long-running dispute with his brothers John VI, George, and Christopher about who would be the sole ruler of the County of Oldenburg. In 1529, he became the regent of the county. In 1531, Emperor Charles V enfeoffed him with the County of Oldenburg-Delmenhorst.

In 1547, during the Schmalkaldic War, he conquered the Castle and Lordship of Delmenhorst, which had been lost to Münster in 1482.

He strengthened the defenses of his county by expanding his fortresses. He paid for these construction projects from the proceeds of church properties he had stolen during the Reformation. The Order of St. John sued him about their stolen possessions; after a lengthy trial, Anthony prevailed.

With the assistance of farmers from Stadland and Butjadingen, which his father had conquered in 1514, he managed to gain a large amount of fertile territory by constructing levees around some wetlands in the Jade Bight. He constructed several large manors to manage this new land.

In 1566, his brother Christopher died, and Anthony became the sole ruler of Oldenburg and Delmenhorst.

Anthony I died in Oldenburg in 1573 and was succeeded by his son John VII.

== Marriage and issue ==
Anthony married on 1 January 1537 in Oldenburg, to Duchess Sophie of Saxe-Lauenburg (d. 7 October 1571 in Oevelgönne), the daughter of Duke Magnus I and Catherine of Brunswick-Wolfenbüttel. They had the following children:

- Catherine of Oldenburg (8 August 1538 – 1 February 1620); married in 1561 to Albert II, Count of Hoya (1526 – 18 March 1563).
- Anna of Oldenburg (3 April 1539 – 25 August 1579); married on 16 February 1566 to John Günther I, Count of Schwarzburg-Sondershausen (20 December 1532 – 28 October 1586).
- John VII, Count of Oldenburg (9 September 1540 – 12 November 1603); married in 1576 to Elisabeth of Schwarzburg-Blankenburg (13 April 1541 – 26 December 1612).
- Christian of Oldenburg (7 November 1544 – 6 August 1570)
- Clara of Oldenburg (1 November 1547 – 30 May 1598)
- Anthony II, Count of Oldenburg (8 September 1550 – 25 October 1619); married in 1600 to Sibylle Elisabeth of Brunswick-Dannenberg (4 June 1576 – 9 July 1630).

== See also ==
- List of rulers of Oldenburg

Anthony I of Oldenburg House of Oldenburg Born: 1505 Died: 22 January 1573 in Oldenburg in Oldenburg
Preceded by John V	Count of Oldenburg; 1526–1573 with his brothers George (1526–1529); John VI (1526–1529) and Christopher (1526–1566)	Succeeded by John VII as Count of Oldenburg
Preceded by John V	Count of Oldenburg; 1526–1573 with his brothers George (1526–1529); John VI (1526–1529) and Christopher (1526–1566)	Succeeded by Anthony II as Count of Oldenburg-Delmenhorst
