= Adolph, Count of Oldenburg-Delmenhorst =

Count of Oldenburg (1482–1500)

Adolph of Oldenburg
- Count of Oldenburg
- Reign: 1482–1500
- Born: before 1463; Oldenburg
- Died: 17 February 1500
- Noble family: House of Oldenburg
- Father: Gerhard VI of Oldenburg
- Mother: Adelheid of Tecklenburg

Adolph, Count of Oldenburg-Delmenhorst (German: Adolf (Alf) von Oldenburg; before 1463 – 17 February 1500) was a Count of Oldenburg from 1482 until his death.

== Biography ==
Adolph was the eldest surviving son of Gerhard VI, Count of Oldenburg. His father, overcome by the forces of the Frisians and the bishopric of Münster, was forced to abdicate in 1482. Adolph then succeeded him as head of the county of Oldenburg alongside his younger brother, John V. Captured by the Frisians in November 1483, Adolph was released after the cessation of hostilities in October 1486, against a ransom of 3,500 florins.

Even after Adolph was released, the county government remained in the hands of his brother John V. Adolph accepted this situation and dedicated himself to the war. With his other brother Otto, he participated in the campaign of Duke Magnus I of Saxe-Lauenburg against the Frisians of Wursten, then an area of free peasant under the loose overlordship of the Prince-Archbishopric of Bremen, which ended in failure in 1499 due to the defense coalition built up by Prince-Archbishop John III. The following year, Adolph and Otto participated to the war against Dithmarses, fighting in the army of their cousin King John of Denmark. However, the two brothers died on 17 February 1500, during the Battle of Hemmingstedt, which ended in a Danish defeat.

Adolph, Count of Oldenburg-Delmenhorst House of Oldenburg Born: before 1463 in Oldenburg Died: 17 February 1500 in Oldenburg
Preceded by Gerhard VI	Count of Oldenburg; 1482–1500	Succeeded by John V
