= Hicko I of Oldersum =

Lord of Oldersum (1465–1529)

Hicko I
- Lord of Oldersum
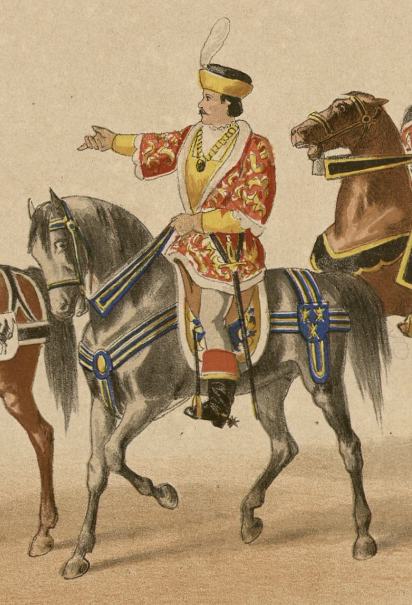
- Hicko I, Lord of Oldersum

Lord of Oldersum
- Reign: 1472–1529
- Predecessor: Haro I
- Successor: Hero I Boing I

Lord of Gödens
- Reign: 1481–1520
- Predecessor: Edo I
- Successor: Haro II
- Alongside: Almut
- Born: c. 1465
- Died: 1529
- Spouse: Almut Boing
- House: Oldersum
- Father: Haro I
- Mother: Duidlef Kankena

Hicko I of Oldersum (c. 1465 - 1529) was a son of the East Frisian chieftain Haro I of Oldersum and his wife Duidlef Kankena. He succeeded his father in 1472, after which he was Lord of Oldersum from 1472 until his death in 1529.

Through his marriage to Almut Boing he came into possession of the Castle of Altgödens. The castle of Altgödens was destroyed during the Saxon feud in 1514. Therefore, Hicko and his son Haro built the predecessor of today's Gödens Castle by 1517.

Hicko I played an important role in defending his own castle in Oldersum during the Saxon feud. In June 1514, the "Black Guard" sacked the city of Norden, after which they turned to Oldersum, where the first battle took place on June 14, 1514. Under the leadership of Ulrich of Dornum and Hicko I von Oldersum, the town was successfully defended. A second attempt to take the town also failed on August 16, 1514.

== Marriage and children ==
He married in 1480 with Lady Almut Boing of Gödens (1454–1520), daughter of Edo I of Gödens. She was the heir to the Lordship of Gödens. Together they had three sons:

- Haro II of Oldersum (1491-1539)
- Hero I of Oldersum (c. 1492-1559)
- Boing I of Oldersum (c. 1500-1540)
