= Folef I of Innhausen and Kniphausen =

Lord of Innhausen and Knyphausen (1467–1531)

Folef I
- Lord of Innhausen; Lord of Knyphausen
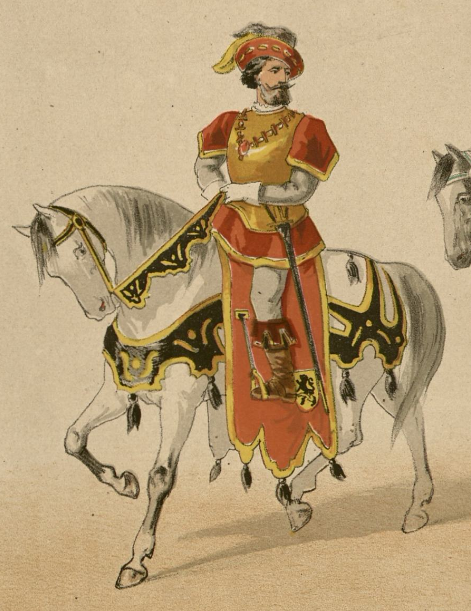
- Folef I, Lord of Innhausen of Knyphausen

Lord of Innhausen
- Reign: 1474-1531
- Predecessor: Alko I
- Successor: Tido I

Lord of Knyphausen
- Reign: 1495-1531
- Predecessor: Iko II
- Successor: Tido I
- Born: 1467
- Died: 1531 (aged 63–64)
- Spouse: Binlef Beninga (m. 1493)
- House: Onneken
- Father: Alko I
- Mother: Hima Haytets

Folef I of Innhausen and Knyphausen (1467-1531) was an East Frisian chieftain who ruled the lordship of Innhausen and later inherited the neighbouring lordship of Knyphausen. He is best known for his alliance with Count Edzard I of East Frisia during the East Frisian–Jeverland conflict of the mid-1490s. After being captured by the Jeverland chieftain Edo Wiemken the Younger, he was rescued by supporters of Edzard and subsequently became one of the count's military allies during the campaign against Jeverland.

== Life ==
=== Background ===
Little is known about Folef's early life. He belonged to the chieftain family of Innhausen, which controlled the lordship of Innhausen in the border region between East Frisia and Jeverland. Folef maintained close ties with the neighbouring lords of Knyphausen, whose territories occupied a strategically important position near the Jade estuary. During the 1490s he emerged as an ally of Count Edzard I of East Frisia in the growing conflict with Edo Wiemken the Younger, the chieftain of Jeverland.

=== Conflict with Edo Wiemken ===
By the mid-1490s, relations between Count Edzard I of East Frisia and Edo Wiemken the Younger, chieftain of Jeverland, had deteriorated considerably. As one of Edzard's supporters in the border region, Folef became a target of Edo's efforts to undermine the East Frisian alliance. In 1494, Edo Wiemken seized Folef while he was visiting the priest of Ackum. Edo accused him of disloyalty and forced the garrison of Innhausen to surrender the castle by promising Folef his freedom. After taking possession of the stronghold, Edo ordered its fortifications to be demolished. Instead of releasing his prisoner, he demanded that Folef renounce his allegiance to the counts of East Frisia and acknowledge him as his lord. Folef refused, whereupon he was taken captive to Jever. The circumstances of Folef's arrest are described differently in the Jeverland tradition. Eilert Sprenger's Jever Chronicle claims that Folef had harboured cattle thieves at his residence and had conspired with Count Edzard against Edo Wiemken, allegations which the East Frisian chroniclers regarded as an attempt to justify Edo's actions. The imprisonment also drew Folef's relatives into the conflict. His aunt Biedeleff travelled to Jever in an attempt to secure his release, but was herself arrested. Shortly afterwards Ico of Knyphausen, Biedeleff's son, also travelled to Jever under a promise of safe conduct in order to negotiate the release of his mother. He too was seized and imprisoned by Edo and Hero Omken.

=== Alliance with Edzard I ===
Folef's imprisonment prompted Edzard I to intervene on his behalf. In 1495, Edzard secretly dispatched Haro of Uitersweer, a close relative of Folef, together with Udo of Coldeborg and a small force to Jever. During a night-time raid, they entered the town by surprise and freed Folef, who was being held in the town rather than the more heavily fortified castle. Folef escaped with his rescuers through Knyphausen to Aurich, where he joined Edzard and vowed revenge against Edo Wiemken. As Edzard prepared his campaign against Jeverland, he entrusted Folef with recruiting the experienced mercenary commander Nittert Fox, who had previously served Duke Albert III of Saxony. Folef successfully negotiated the enlistment of Fox and his company, which included several veteran captains from the Low Countries and northern Germany. Their arrival significantly strengthened Edzard's army before the invasion of Jeverland. Folef subsequently accompanied Edzard during the campaign against Edo Wiemken and Hero Omken. After the East Frisian victory outside Jever, he took part in operations across the surrounding countryside, compelling local communities to submit to Edzard's authority while devastating areas that continued to resist. The campaign ultimately forced Edo Wiemken to negotiate and marked a major expansion of East Frisian influence in the region.

=== Lord of Knyphausen ===
Following the death of Ico of Knyphausen, the lordship of Knyphausen passed to Folef, uniting the neighbouring lordships of Innhausen and Knyphausen under his authority. As a result of Edzard I's intervention in the conflict with Jeverland, Knyphausen had become a fief of the County of East Frisia, strengthening the count's influence along the Jade frontier.

== Marriage and children ==
He married in 1493 with Binlef Beninga (1479–after 1514), daughter of Ubbo Tydena Edelinga and had seven children:

- Catharina of Inn- and Knyphausen (c. 1494 - ?)
- Tido I of Inn- and Knyphausen (c. 1500 - 18 February 1566)
- Hebrich of Inn- and Knyphausen (c. 1500 - 1557)
- Iko of Inn- and Knyphausen (c. 1500 - 1530)
- Ubbo of Inn- and Knyphausen (c. 1500 - 9 August 1540)
- Lubbo of Inn- and Knyphausen (c. 1500 - 1539)
- Metta of Inn- and Knyphausen (c. 1500 - ?)

== Bibliography ==
- Beninga, Eggerik (1854). Chronyk ofte Historie van Oostfriesland. Edited by Louis Hahn. Emden: W. Haynel.
- Emmius, Ubbo (1616). Rerum Frisicarum Historia. Leiden: Elzevier.
- Wiarda, Tileman Dothias (1792). Ostfriesische Geschichte. Vol. II. Aurich.
- Friedländer, Ernst (ed.) (1878–1881). Ostfriesisches Urkundenbuch. Vols. I–II. Emden.
