= Anthony Günther, Count of Oldenburg =

Count of Oldenburg (1603–1667)

Anthony Günther
- Count of Oldenburg
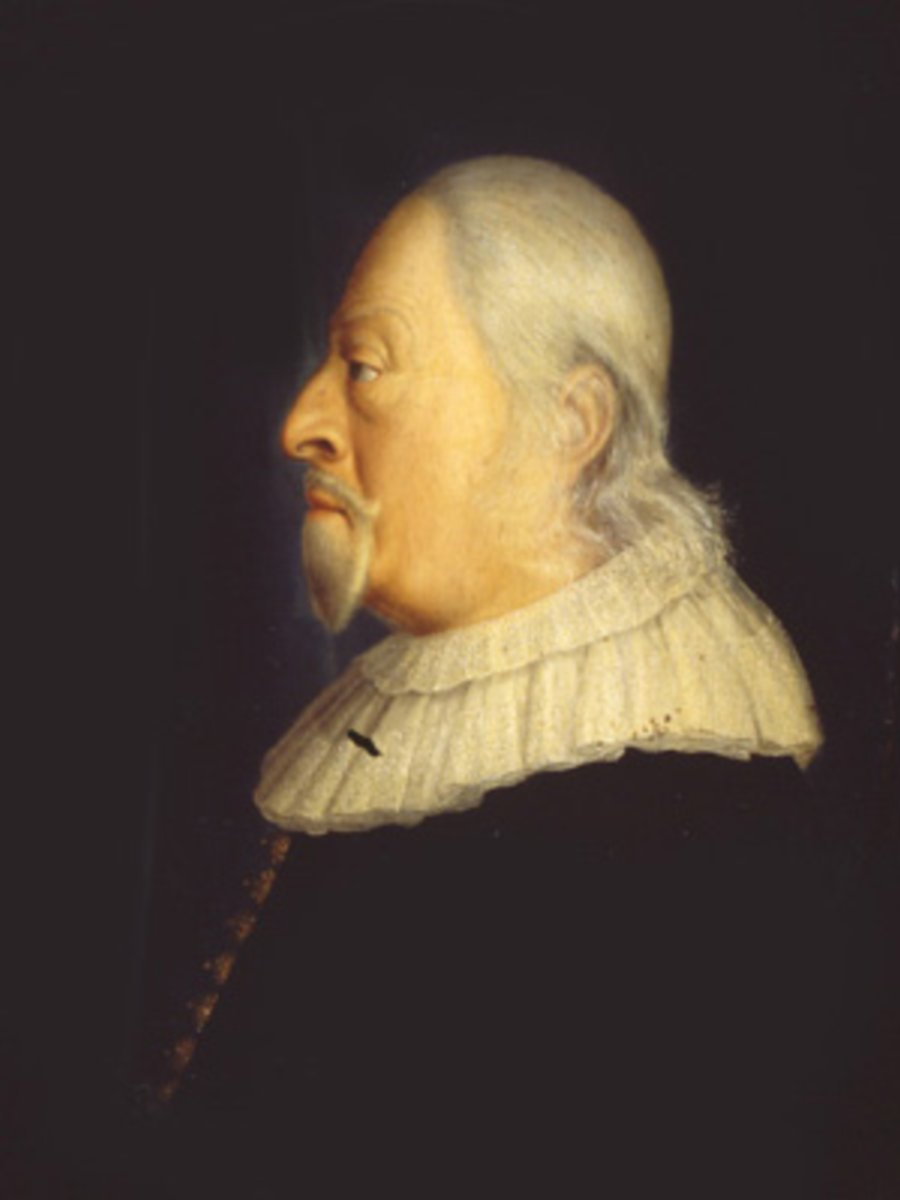
- Anthony Günther of Oldenburg
- Born: 10 November 1583; Oldenburg
- Died: 19 June 1667 (aged 83); Rastede
- Noble family: House of Oldenburg
- Spouse: Sophie Catherine of Schleswig-Holstein-Sonderburg
- Father: John VII, Count of Oldenburg
- Mother: Elisabeth of Schwarzburg-Blankenburg

Anthony Günther, Count of Oldenburg (aka Anton Günther, 10 November 1583 – 19 June 1667) was an Imperial Count and a member of the House of Oldenburg.

== Early life and ancestry ==
Günther was born in Oldenburg, into the House of Oldenburg and was the ruling count of Oldenburg from 1603 until his death in Rastede, and of Delmenhorst from 1647 until his death. He was the son of John VII (1540–1603) and Countess Elisabeth of Schwarzburg-Blankenburg.

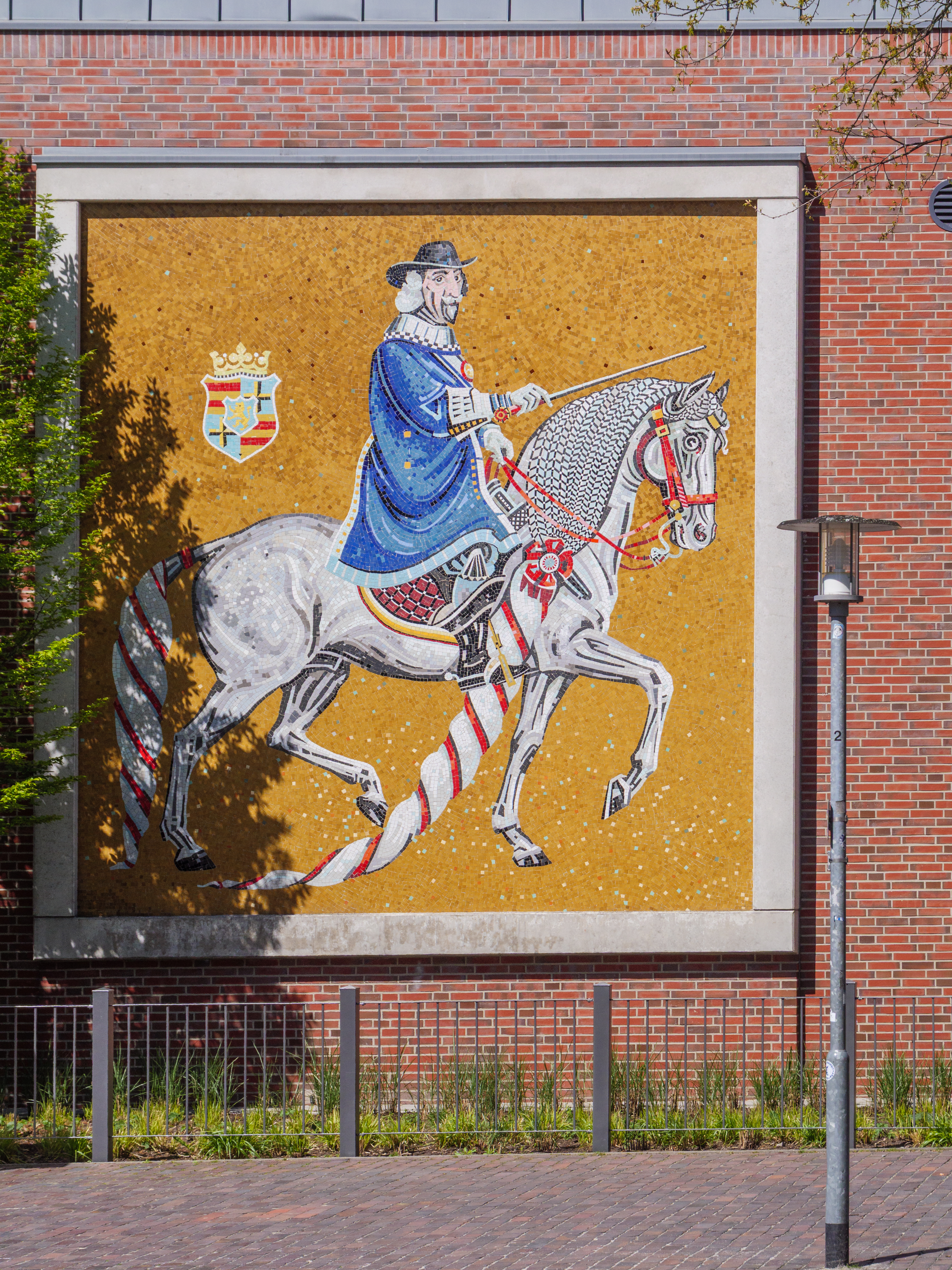
Mosaic at the Graf-Anton-Günther-Schule Oldenburg

== Biography ==
S. Baring-Gould relates the following interesting anecdote about the count in his book "Strange Survivals Some Chapters in the History of Man":

In 1615 Count Anthony Günther of Oldenburg, on visiting a dyke in process of construction, found the workmen about to bury an infant under it. The count interfered, saved the child, reprimanded the dam-builders, and imprisoned the mother who had sold her babe for the purpose. Singularly enough, this same count is declared by tradition to have buried a living child in the foundations of his castle at Oldenburg.

== Haus "Graf Anton Günther" ==
The Haus "Graf Anton Günther" is a historic house in central Oldenburg, dating from 1682. Count Anton Günther is depicted on the facade, which was redesigned in the neo-Renaissance style in 1894. The house was used by merchants and tobacco manufacturers.

== Marriage ==
Anthony Günther married his relative, Duchess Sophie Catherine of Schleswig-Holstein-Sonderburg (28 June 1617 – 22 November 1696), a daughter of Alexander, Duke of Schleswig-Holstein-Sonderburg and Countess Dorothea of Schwarzburg-Sondershausen (1579–1639). They had no children.

== Counts of Aldenburg ==
Coat of Arms of the Counts of Aldenburg

He had an extramarital liaison with his mistress, Elisabeth Margarethe von Ungnad, Freiin von Sonnegg (1605–1670), member of the Austrian nobility settled in the Kingdom of Bohemia. She was elder daughter of Andreas von Ungnad, Freiherr zu Sonnegg (1579–1634) by his wife, Margarethe von Prag, Freiin von Windhag zu Engelstein (1585–1669).

The affair resulted in birth of one son:

- Count Anton I von Aldenburg (1633–1680); married on 22 April 1659 to, firstly Countess Auguste Johanna of Sayn-Wittgenstein-Hohenstein (1638–1669), and had issue, secondly to Charlotte Amélie de La Trémoille (1652-1732), and had issue.

Their issue became Counts of Aldenburg, whose line died out with its last representative, Countess Charlotte Sophie of Aldenburg, married to William, Count Bentinck, Lord of Rhoon and Pendrecht.

Their descendants became Counts of Bentinck-Aldenburg, a mediatised house, former ruling family of the Holy Roman Empire. As such, the House of Bentinck-Aldenburg belonged to the high nobility with equal status of birth for marriage purposes to other European royal families.

== Sources ==
- Friedrich-Wilhelm Schaer: Anton Günther, in: Hans Friedl, Wolfgang Günther, Hilke Günther-Arndt and Heinrich Schmidt (eds.): Biographisches Handbuch zur Geschichte des Landes Oldenburg, Isensee Verlag, Oldenburg, 1992, ISBN 3-89442-135-5, pp. 37–40
- Karl Veit Riedel: August Oetken, in: Biographisches Handbuch zur Geschichte des Landes Oldenburg, Isensee Verlag, Oldenburg, 1992, ISBN 3-89442-135-5, pp. 534–535
- Gerold Schmidt: Der Kirchenmaler und Mosaikkünstler des Historismus Prof. August Oetken (1868–1951), Mitgestalter des Melanchthonhauses in Bretten, in: Stefan Rhein and Gerhard Schwinge (eds.): Das Melanchthonhaus Bretten. Ein Beispiel des Reformationsgedenkens der Jahrhundertwende, Verlag Regionalkultur, Ubstadt-Weiher, 1997, ISBN 3-929366-63-0, pp. 167–212

Anthony Günther, Count of Oldenburg House of Oldenburg Born: 10 November 1583 Died: 19 June 1667
Preceded by John VII	Count of Oldenburg; 1603–1667	Succeeded by Frederick I
Preceded by Christian IX	Count of Delmenhorst; 1647–1667	Succeeded by Frederick I
