= John VII of Oldenburg =

Count of Oldenburg (1573-1603)

John VII
- Count of Oldenburg
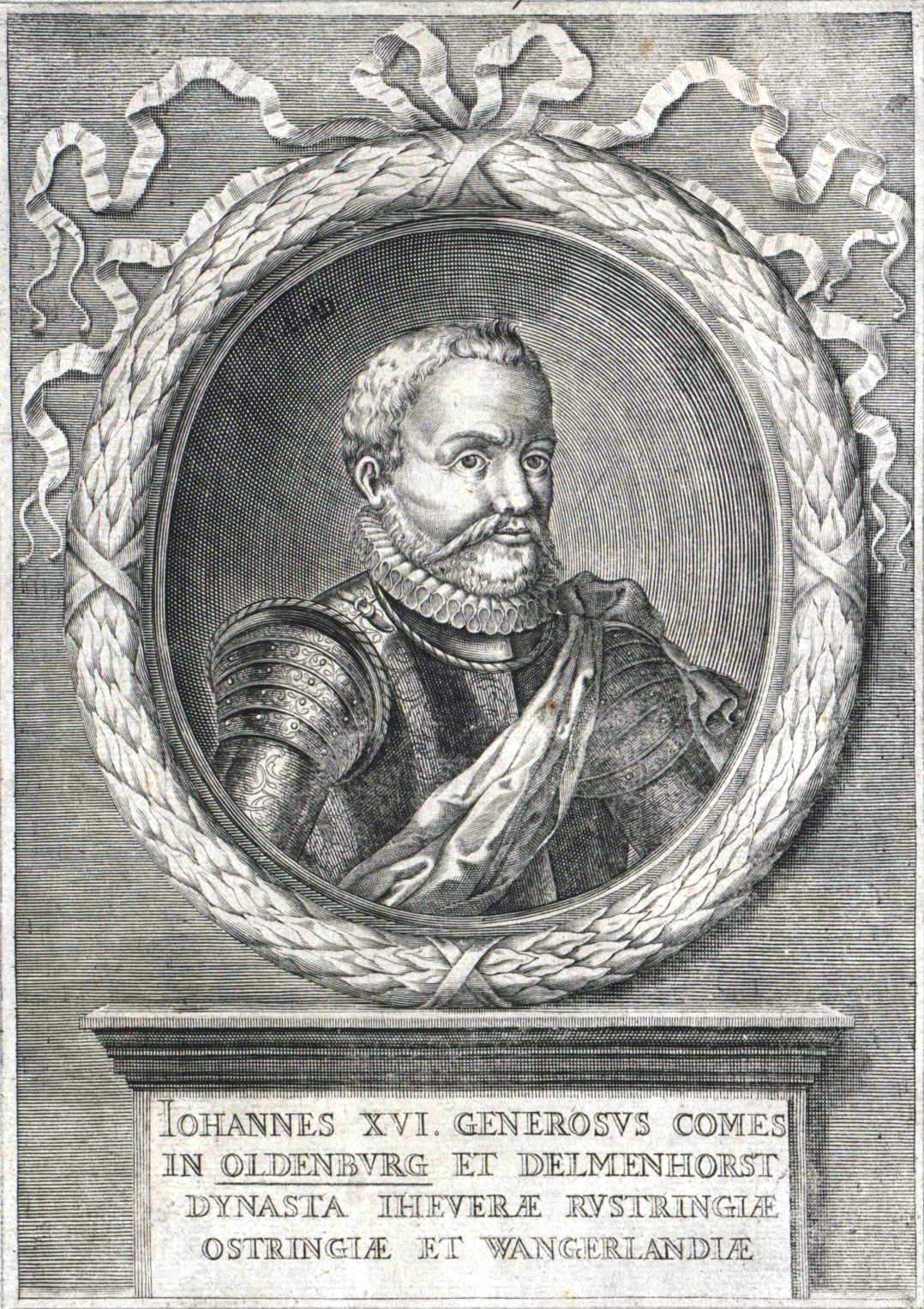
- Born: 9 September 1540; Oldenburg
- Died: 12 November 1603 (aged 63); Oldenburg
- Noble family: House of Oldenburg
- Spouse: Elisabeth of Schwarzburg-Blankenburg
- Father: Anthony I, Count of Oldenburg
- Mother: Sophie of Saxe-Lauenburg

Count John VII of Oldenburg and Delmenhorst (nicknamed "the Dike Builder"; 9 September 1540 in Oldenburg – 12 November 1603 in Oldenburg) was a member of the House of Oldenburg and was the ruling Count of County of Oldenburg from 1573 until his death. His parents were Count Anthony I of Oldenburg and Sophie of Saxe-Lauenburg.

== Life ==
In 1573, John VII inherited the County of Oldenburg from his father. In 1575, he inherited the Lordship of Jever from Maria of Jever, despite objections by Count Edzard II of East Frisia. In 1577, he had to concede the revenue from Harpstedt, Delmenhorst, Varel and some minor castles to his younger brother Anthony II for a 10-year period. In 1597, the Aulic Council ordered that the County of Delmenhorst be split off from Oldenburg; this separation would last until 1647.

In 1596, John VII attempted to dam the Schwarze Brack, in order to create a land link from Oldenburg to Jever. He had to cancel this project under pressure of Edzard II. John VII nevertheless earned the nickname "dike builder" with his costly land reclamation projects in Butjadingen and the Jade Bight.

He reorganized the administration and the judiciary and modernized the organization of the Lutheran Church in Oldenburg. His superintendent Hamelmann unified the Lutheran confession.

John VII died in 1603 and was succeeded by his son Anthony Günther.

== Marriage ==
In 1576 John VII married Countess Elisabeth of Schwarzburg (1541–1612), daughter of Günther XL, Count of Schwarzburg. John and Elisabeth had six children:

- John (1578–1580)
- Anne (1579–1639)
- Elizabeth (1581–1619)
- Catherine (1582–1644), married in 1633 Augustus of Saxe-Lauenburg
- Anthony Günther (1583–1667), succeeding Count of Oldenburg
- Magdalene (1585–1657), heiress of Jever; married in 1612 Rudolph, Prince of Anhalt-Zerbst.

== See also ==
- List of rulers of Oldenburg

John VII of Oldenburg House of Oldenburg Born: 9 September 1540 Died: 12 November 1603
Preceded by Anthony I	Count of Oldenburg; 1573–1603	Succeeded by Anthony Günther
Preceded by Maria	Lord of Jever; 1575–1603	Succeeded by Rudolph
